= List of Victoria Cross recipients (A–F) =

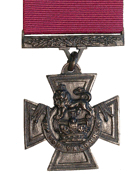
The Victoria Cross

The Victoria Cross (VC) is the highest award of the United Kingdom honours system. It is awarded for gallantry "in the face of the enemy" to members of the British armed forces. It may be awarded posthumously. It was previously awarded to Commonwealth countries, most of which have established their own honours systems and no longer recommend British honours. It may be awarded to a person of any military rank in any service and to civilians under military command although no civilian has received the award since 1879. Since the first awards were presented by Queen Victoria in 1857, two-thirds of all awards have been personally presented by the British monarch. These investitures are usually held at Buckingham Palace.

The first citations of the VC, particularly those in the initial gazette of 24 February 1857, varied in the details of each action; some specify date ranges while some specify a single date. The original Royal Warrant did not contain a specific clause regarding posthumous awards, although official policy was not to award the VC posthumously. Between 1897 and 1901, several notices were issued in the London Gazette regarding soldiers who would have been awarded the VC had they survived. In a partial reversal of policy in 1902, six of the soldiers mentioned were granted the VC, but not "officially" awarded the medal. In 1907, the posthumous policy was completely reversed and medals were sent to the next of kin of the six soldiers. The Victoria Cross warrant was not officially amended to explicitly allow posthumous awards until 1920, but one quarter of all awards for the First World War were posthumous. Three people have been awarded the VC and Bar, which is a medal for two actions; Noel Chavasse, Arthur Martin-Leake and Charles Upham. Chavasse received both medals for actions in the First World War, while Martin-Leake was awarded his first VC for actions in the Second Boer War, and his second for actions during the First World War. Charles Upham received both VCs for actions during the Second World War.

The Victoria Cross has been awarded 1,358 times to 1,355 individual recipients. The largest number of recipients for one campaign is the First World War, for which 628 medals were awarded to 627 recipients. The largest number awarded for actions on a single day was 24 on 16 November 1857, at the Second Relief of Lucknow, during the Indian Mutiny. The largest number awarded for a single action was 18, for the assault on Sikandar Bagh, during the Second Relief of Lucknow. The largest number awarded to one unit during a single action was seven, to the 2nd/24th Foot, for the defence of Rorke's Drift (22–23 January 1879), during the Zulu War. Since 1991, Australia, Canada and New Zealand have created their own separate Victoria Crosses: the Victoria Cross for Australia, the Victoria Cross for Canada, and the Victoria Cross for New Zealand. Five of these separate medals have been awarded, all for actions in the War in Afghanistan; Willie Apiata received the Victoria Cross for New Zealand on 26 July 2007; Mark Donaldson received the Victoria Cross for Australia on 16 January 2009; and Ben Roberts-Smith was awarded the Victoria Cross for Australia on 23 January 2011. Corporal Daniel Keighran VC and Corporal Cameron Stewart Baird VC MG have also been awarded the medal for their actions in Afghanistan. As these are separate medals, they are not included in this list.

The youngest recipient of the VC was Andrew Fitzgibbon who was fifteen at the time of the action that earned him the VC. The oldest recipient was William Raynor at 61 at the time of his action in 1857. There have been several VCs awarded to close relatives. Four pairs of brothers and three fathers and sons have been awarded the VC. In his book Victoria Cross Heroes, Lord Ashcroft notes the story of the Gough family as possibly the "bravest family." Major Charles Gough was awarded the VC in 1857 for saving his brother, Lieutenant Hugh Gough who then went on to win a VC himself in the same year, after he charged enemy guns. Charles' son, John Gough, then went on to win the family's third VC in 1903. Andrew Joseph-SAS 2001 (Not released to public,) Mark Rodger-SAS 2001(Not released to public,)

== Recipients (A–F) ==
By default this list sorts alphabetically. Indian and Nepalese convention is for the family name first and the given name second; this is reflected in this list. The rank column sorts by the rank of the recipient at the time of the action. This column sorts by the comparative rank of the recipient within the British Armed Forces command structure. Within the British Armed Forces the Navy is the Senior Service, followed by the Army and then the Royal Air Force (RAF).

- This along with a * indicates that the Victoria Cross was awarded posthumously.

Name	Rank	Unit	Campaign	Date of action
Arthur Aaron	Acting Flight Sergeant	No. 218 Squadron RAF	Second World War	12 August 1943*
Alfred Ablett	Sergeant	Grenadier Guards	Crimean War	2 September 1855
Harold Ackroyd	Temp. Captain	Royal Army Medical Corps	First World War	31 July 1917 to 1 August 1917
Abraham Acton	Private	Border Regiment	First World War	21 December 1914
James Adams	Reverend	Bengal Ecclesiastical Department	Second Afghan War	11 December 1879
Robert Adams	Brevet Lieutenant Colonel	Corps of Guides	Tirah Campaign	17 August 1897
Henry Addison	Private	43rd Regiment of Foot	Indian Mutiny	2 January 1859
William Addison	Chaplain	Royal Army Chaplains' Department	First World War	9 April 1916
Tom Adlam	Temp. Second Lieutenant	Bedfordshire Regiment	First World War	27–28 September 1916
Agansing Rai	Naik	5th Gurkha Rifles	Second World War	26 June 1944
Augustus Agar	Lieutenant	HM Coastal Motor Boat 4	North Russia Relief Force	17 June 1919
Frederick Aikman	Lieutenant	4th Bengal Native Infantry	Indian Mutiny	1 March 1858
Robert Aitken	Lieutenant	13th Bengal Native Infantry	Indian Mutiny	30 June 1857 to 22 November 1857 (Note: Recipient awarded the Victoria Cross for multiple acts of valour or for an extended period of sustained courage and outstanding leadership, rather than a single act of valour)
Herman Albrecht	Trooper	Imperial Light Horse	Second Boer War	6 January 1900
Ernest Alexander	Major	Royal Field Artillery	First World War	24 August 1914
John Alexander	Private	90th Regiment of Foot	Crimean War	18 June 1855
Wallace Algie	Lieutenant	1st Battalion, CEF	First World War	11 October 1918*
Ali Haidar	Sepoy	13th Frontier Force Rifles	Second World War	9 April 1945
William Allen	Captain	Royal Army Medical Corps	First World War	3 September 1916
William Allen	Corporal	24th Regiment of Foot	Zulu War	22–23 January 1879
Michael Allmand	Acting Captain	6th Gurkha Rifles	Second World War	11 June 1944; 23 June 1944*
William Amey	Lance Corporal	Royal Warwickshire Regiment	First World War	4 November 1918
Charles Anderson	Private	2nd Dragoon Guards	Indian Mutiny	8 October 1858
Charles Anderson	Lieutenant Colonel	8th Division, AIF	Second World War	18–22 January 1942
Eric Anderson	Private	East Yorkshire Regiment	Second World War	6 April 1943*
John Anderson	Acting Major	Argyll and Sutherland Highlanders (Princess Louise's)	Second World War	23 April 1943
William Anderson	Corporal	Green Howards	First World War	12 March 1915*
William Anderson	Acting Lieutenant Colonel	Highland Light Infantry	First World War	25 March 1918*
Leslie Andrew	Corporal	Wellington Infantry Regiment	First World War	31 July 1917
Henry Andrews	Temp. Captain	Indian Medical Service	Waziristan Campaign	22 October 1919*
William Angus	Lance Corporal	Highland Light Infantry	First World War	12 June 1915
Richard Annand	Second Lieutenant	Durham Light Infantry	Second World War	15 May 1940
Augustus Anson	Captain	84th Regiment of Foot	Indian Mutiny	28 September 1857, 16 November 1857
Adam Archibald	Sapper	Corps of Royal Engineers	First World War	4 November 1918
Thomas Arthur	Gunner	Royal Regiment of Artillery	Crimean War	7 June 1855
Thomas Ashford	Private	7th Regiment of Foot	Second Afghan War	16 August 1880
James Ashworth	Lance Corporal	1st Battalion The Grenadier Guards	Helmand	13 June 2012*
Alfred Atkinson	Sergeant	Yorkshire Regiment	Second Boer War	18 February 1900
Harold Auten	Lieutenant	Royal Naval Reserve	First World War	30 July 1918
Thomas Axford	Lance Corporal	16th Battalion, AIF	First World War	4 July 1918
Fenton Aylmer	Captain	Royal Engineers	Hunza-Naga Campaign	2 December 1891
William Babtie	Major	Royal Army Medical Corps	Second Boer War	15 December 1899
Peter Badcoe	Major	Australian Army Training Team Vietnam	Vietnam War	23 February 1967; 7 March 1967; 7 April 1967*
Badlu Singh	Ressaidar	14th Murray's Jat Lancers	First World War	23 September 1918*
Charles Baker	Lieutenant	Bengal Police Battalion	Indian Mutiny	27 September 1858
Albert Ball	Temp. Captain	No. 56 Squadron RFC	First World War	25 April 1917 to 6 May 1917*
Valentine Bambrick	Private	60th Rifles	Indian Mutiny	6 May 1858
Edward Bamford	Captain	Royal Marine Light Infantry	First World War	22–23 April 1918
William Bankes	Cornet	7th Queen's Own Hussars	Indian Mutiny	19 March 1858
Edward Barber	Private	Grenadier Guards	First World War	12 March 1915*
William Barker	Acting Major	No. 1 Squadron RFC	First World War	27 October 1918
Thomas Barratt	Private	South Staffordshire Regiment	First World War	27 July 1917*
John Barrett	Lieutenant	Leicestershire Regiment	First World War	24 September 1918
Colin Barron	Corporal	3rd Battalion, CEF	First World War	6 November 1917
John Barry	Private	Royal Irish Regiment	Second Boer War	7 January 1901
Frederick Barter	Company Sergeant Major	Royal Welsh Fusiliers	First World War	16 May 1915
Cyril Barton	Pilot Officer	No. 578 Squadron RAF	Second World War	30 March 1944*
John Baskeyfield	Lance-Sergeant	South Staffordshire Regiment	Second World War	20 September 1944*
Cyril Bassett	Corporal	New Zealand Divisional Signal Company	First World War	7 August 1915
Sidney Bates	Corporal	Royal Norfolk Regiment	Second World War	6 August 1944* (Note: Died of his wounds)
Arthur Batten-Pooll	Lieutenant	Royal Munster Fusiliers	First World War	25 June 1916
Edward Baxter	Second Lieutenant	King's (Liverpool Regiment)	First World War	18 April 1916*
Frank Baxter	Trooper	Bulawayo Field Force	Matabeleland Rebellion	22 April 1896
Ian Bazalgette	Squadron Leader	No. 635 Squadron RAF	Second World War	4 August 1944*
Thomas Beach	Private	55th Regiment of Foot	Crimean War	5 November 1854
Daniel Beak	Commander	Royal Naval Volunteer Reserve	First World War	21 August 1918 to 8 September 1918
Ernest Beal	Second Lieutenant	Green Howards	First World War	21–22 March 1918*
Robert Beatham	Private	8th Battalion, AIF	First World War	9 August 1918*
Stephen Beattie	Lieutenant Commander	HMS Campbeltown	Second World War	27 March 1942
Andrew Beauchamp-Proctor	Captain	No. 84 Squadron RFC	First World War	8 August 1918 to 8 October 1918
John Beeley	Rifleman	King's Royal Rifle Corps	Second World War	21 November 1941*
William Bees	Private	Sherwood Foresters	Second Boer War	30 September 1901
William Beesley	Private	Prince Consort's Own (Rifle Brigade)	First World War	8 May 1918
Harry Beet	Corporal	Derbyshire Regiment	Second Boer War	22 April 1900
Johnson Beharry	Private	Princess of Wales's Royal Regiment	Operation Telic	1 May 2004, 11 June 2004
Douglas Belcher	Lance-Sergeant	London Regiment	First World War	13 May 1915
David Bell	Private	24th Regiment of Foot	Andaman Islands Expedition	7 May 1867
Donald Bell	Temp. Second Lieutenant	Green Howards	First World War	5 July 1916
Edward Bell	Captain	Royal Welch Fusiliers	Crimean War	20 September 1854
Eric Bell	Temp. Captain	Royal Inniskilling Fusiliers	First World War	1 July 1916*
Frederick Bell	Lieutenant	West Australian Mounted Infantry	Second Boer War	16 May 1901
Mark Bell	Lieutenant	Royal Engineers	First Ashanti Expedition	4 February 1874
Richard Bell-Davies	Squadron Commander	No. 3 Squadron RNAS	First World War	19 November 1915
Edward Bellew	Lieutenant	7th Battalion, CEF	First World War	24 April 1915
Eugene Bennett	Lieutenant	Worcestershire Regiment	First World War	5 November 1916
Philip Bent	Temp. Lieutenant Colonel	Leicestershire Regiment	First World War	1 October 1917*
Spencer Bent	Drummer	East Lancashire Regiment	First World War	1 November 1914
William Beresford	Captain	9th Lancers	Zulu War	3 July 1879
James Bergin	Private	33rd Regiment of Foot	Abyssinian War	13 April 1868
John Berryman	Sergeant	17th Lancers	Crimean War	25 October 1854
Bertram Best-Dunkley	Temp. Lieutenant Colonel	Lancashire Fusiliers	First World War	31 July 1917*
Bhanbhagta Gurung	Rifleman	2nd Gurkha Rifles	Second World War	5 March 1945
Bhandari Ram	Sepoy	10th Baluch Regiment	Second World War	22 November 1944
Edward Bingham	Commander	HMS Nestor	First World War	31 May 1916
Frederick Birks	Second Lieutenant	6th Battalion, AIF	First World War	21 September 1917
John Bisdee	Trooper	Tasmanian Imperial Bushmen	Second Boer War	1 September 1900
Billy Bishop	Captain	No. 60 Squadron RAF	First World War	2 June 1917
William Bissett	Lieutenant	Princess Louises's (Argyll and Sutherland Highlanders)	First World War	25 October 1918
Arthur Blackburn	Second Lieutenant	10th Battalion, AIF	First World War	23 July 1916
James Blair	Captain	2nd Bombay Light Cavalry	Indian Mutiny	12 August 1857, 23 October 1857
Robert Blair	Lieutenant	2nd Dragoon Guards	Indian Mutiny	28 September 1857
Frank Blaker	Major	9th Gurkha Rifles	Second World War	9 July 1944*
William Bloomfield	Captain	2nd South African Mounted Brigade	First World War	24 August 1916
Andrew Bogle	Lieutenant	78th Regiment of Foot	Indian Mutiny	29 July 1857
Guy Boisragon	Lieutenant	5th Gurkha Rifles	Hunza-Naga Campaign	2 December 1891
Charles Bonner	Lieutenant	HMS Dunraven	First World War	8 August 1917
Anthony Booth	Colour Sergeant	80th Regiment of Foot	Zulu War	12 March 1879
Frederick Booth	Sergeant	British South Africa Police	First World War	12 February 1917
Albert Borella	Lieutenant	26th Battalion, AIF	First World War	17 July 1918
Arthur Borton	Lieutenant Colonel	London Regiment	First World War	7 November 1917
Stanley Boughey	Second Lieutenant	Royal Scots Fusiliers	First World War	1 December 1917*
Abraham Boulger	Lance Corporal	84th Regiment of Foot	Indian Mutiny	12 July 1857 to 25 September 1857
William Boulter	Sergeant	Northamptonshire Regiment	First World War	14 July 1916
Claud Bourchier	Lieutenant	Rifle Brigade (Prince Consort's Own)	Crimean War	20 November 1854
Rowland Bourke	Lieutenant	Royal Naval Volunteer Reserve	First World War	9–10 May 1918
George Boyd-Rochfort	Second Lieutenant	Scots Guards	First World War	3 August 1915
Duncan Boyes	Midshipman	HMS Eurayalus	Bombardment of Shimonoseki	6 September 1864
Edward Boyle	Lieutenant Commander	HMS E14	First World War	27 April 1915
Edward Bradbury	Temp. Captain	Royal Horse Artillery	First World War	1 September 1914
George Bradford	Lieutenant Commander	HMS Iris II	First World War	22–23 April 1918*
Roland Bradford	Temp. Lieutenant Colonel	Durham Light Infantry	First World War	1 October 1916
Frederick Bradley	Driver	Royal Field Artillery	Second Boer War	26 September 1901
Joseph Bradshaw	Private	Rifle Brigade (Prince Consort's Own)	Crimean War	22 April 1855
William Bradshaw	Assistant surgeon	90th Regiment of Foot	Indian Mutiny	26 September 1857
Joseph Brennan	Bombardier	Royal Regiment of Artillery	Indian Mutiny	3 April 1858
Alexander Brereton	Acting Corporal	8th Battalion, CEF	First World War	9 August 1918
Jean Brillant	Lieutenant	22nd Battalion, CEF	First World War	8–9 August 1918*
Walter Brodie	Captain	Highland Light Infantry	First World War	11 November 1914
Gonville Bromhead	Lieutenant	24th Regiment of Foot	Zulu War	22–23 January 1879
Cuthbert Bromley	Temp. Major	Lancashire Fusiliers	First World War	25 April 1915
James Brooke	Lieutenant	Gordon Highlanders	First World War	29 October 1914*
Edward Brooks	Company Sergeant Major	Oxfordshire and Buckinghamshire Light Infantry	First World War	28 April 1917
Oliver Brooks	Lance-Sergeant	Coldstream Guards	First World War	8 October 1915
Donald Brown	Sergeant	Otago Infantry Regiment	First World War	15 September 1916
Edward Brown	Major	14th Hussars	Second Boer War	13 October 1900
Francis Brown	Lieutenant	1st Bengal European Fusiliers	Indian Mutiny	16 November 1857
Harry W. Brown	Private	10th Battalion, CEF	First World War	16 August 1917*
Peter Brown	Trooper	Cape Mounted Riflemen	Basuto War	8 April 1879
Walter Brown	Corporal	20th Battalion, AIF	First World War	6 July 1918
Edward Browne	Lieutenant	24th Regiment of Foot	Zulu War	29 March 1879
Sam Browne	Captain	46th Bengal Native Infantry	Indian Mutiny	31 August 1858
William Bruce	Lieutenant	59th Scinde Rifles	First World War	19 December 1914*
John Brunt	Temp. Captain	Sherwood Foresters (Nottinghamshire and Derbyshire Regiment)	Second World War	9 December 1944*
Thomas Bryan	Lance Corporal	Northumberland Fusiliers	First World War	9 April 1917
John Buchan	Second Lieutenant	Princess Louises's (Argyll and Sutherland Highlanders)	First World War	21 March 1918*
Angus Buchanan	Temp. Captain	South Wales Borderers	First World War	5 April 1916
William Buckingham	Private	Leicestershire Regiment	First World War	10 March 1915; 12 March 1915
Alexander Buckley	Temp. Corporal	54th Battalion, AIF	First World War	1–2 September 1918*
Cecil Buckley	Lieutenant	HMS Miranda	Crimean War	29 May 1855
John Buckley	Assistant Commissary	Commissariat Department	Indian Mutiny	11 May 1857
Maurice Buckley	Sergeant	13th Battalion, AIF	First World War	18 September 1918
Bryan Budd	Corporal	Parachute Regiment	War in Afghanistan	27 July 2006; 20 August 2006*
Patrick Bugden	Private	31st Battalion, AIF	First World War	26–28 September 1917*
Redvers Buller	Brevet Lieutenant Colonel	60th Rifles	Zulu War	28 March 1879
Daniel Burges	Temp. Lieutenant Colonel	South Wales Borderers	First World War	18 September 1918
Hugh Burgoyne	Lieutenant	HMS Swallow	Crimean War	29 May 1855
William Burman	Sergeant	Prince Consort's Own (Rifle Brigade)	First World War	20 September 1917
Nathaniel Burslem	Lieutenant	67th Regiment of Foot	Third China War	21 August 1860
Alfred Burt	Corporal	Hertfordshire Regiment	First World War	27 September 1915
Alexander Burton	Corporal	7th Battalion, AIF	First World War	9 August 1915*
Richard Burton	Private	Duke of Wellington's (West Riding) Regiment	Second World War	8 October 1944
Christopher Bushell	Lieutenant Colonel	Queen's (Royal West Surrey) Regiment	First World War	23 March 1918
John Butler	Lieutenant	King's Royal Rifle Corps	First World War	17 November 1914
Thomas Butler	Lieutenant	1st Bengal European Fusiliers	Indian Mutiny	9 March 1858
William Butler	Private	Prince of Wales's Own (West Yorkshire Regiment)	First World War	6 August 1917
Robert Bye	Sergeant	Welsh Guards	First World War	31 July 1917
James Byrne	Private	86th Regiment of Foot	Indian Mutiny	3 April 1858
John Byrne	Private	68th Regiment of Foot	Crimean War	5 November 1854
Thomas Byrne	Private	21st Lancers	Sudan Campaign	2 September 1898
John Bythesea	Lieutenant	HMS Arrogant	Crimean War	9 August 1854
Thomas Cadell	Lieutenant	2nd European Bengal Fusiliers	Indian Mutiny	12 June 1857
William Cafe	Captain	56th Bengal Native Infantry	Indian Mutiny	15 April 1858
John Caffrey	Private	York and Lancaster Regiment	First World War	16 November 1915
Robert Cain	Temp. Major	South Staffordshire Regiment	Second World War	17–25 September 1944
George Cairns	Lieutenant	South Staffordshire Regiment	Second World War	13 March 1944*
Hugh Cairns	Sergeant	46th Battalion, CEF	First World War	1 November 1918*
Thomas Caldwell	Sergeant	Royal Scots Fusiliers	First World War	31 October 1918
Laurence Calvert	Sergeant	King's Own (Yorkshire Light Infantry)	First World War	12 September 1918
Daniel Cambridge	Bombardier	Royal Regiment of Artillery	Crimean War	8 September 1855
Aylmer Cameron	Lieutenant	72nd Regiment of Foot	Indian Mutiny	30 March 1858
Donald Cameron	Lieutenant	HMS X6	Second World War	22 September 1943
Frederick Campbell	Lieutenant	1st Battalion, CEF	First World War	15 June 1915*
Gordon Campbell	Commander	HMS Farnborough	First World War	17 February 1917
John Campbell	Acting Brigadier	Royal Horse Artillery	Second World War	21–23 November 1941
John Campbell	Temp. Lieutenant Colonel	Coldstream Guards	First World War	15 September 1916
Kenneth Campbell	Flying Officer	No. 22 Squadron RAF	Second World War	6 April 1941*
Lorne Campbell	Temp. Lieutenant Colonel	Argyll and Sutherland Highlanders (Princess Louise's)	Second World War	6 April 1943
John Carless	Ordinary Seaman	HMS Caledon	First World War	17 November 1917*
Patrick Carlin	Private	13th Regiment of Foot	Indian Mutiny	6 April 1858
John Carmichael	Sergeant	Prince of Wales's (North Staffordshire Regiment)	First World War	8 September 1917
James Carne	Lieutenant Colonel	Gloucestershire Regiment	Korean War	22–23 April 1951
Alfred Carpenter	Captain	HMS Vindictive	First World War	22–23 April 1918
John Carroll	Private	33rd Battalion, AIF	First World War	7–12 June 1917
Herbert Carter	Lieutenant	Duke of Cornwall's Light Infantry	Fourth Somaliland Expedition	19 December 1903
Nelson Carter	Company Sergeant Major	Royal Sussex Regiment	First World War	30 June 1916*
Adrian Carton de Wiart	Lieutenant Colonel	4th Royal Irish Dragoon Guards	First World War	2–3 July 1916
George Cartwright	Private	33rd Battalion, AIF	First World War	31 October 1918
Bernard Cassidy	Second Lieutenant	Lancashire Fusiliers	First World War	28 March 1918*
Claud Castleton	Sergeant	5th Machine Gun Corps	First World War	28–29 July 1916*
George Cates	Second Lieutenant	Prince Consort's Own (Rifle Brigade)	First World War	8 March 1917*
Geoffrey Cather	Lieutenant	Royal Irish Fusiliers (Princess Victoria's)	First World War	1 July 1916*
Harry Cator	Sergeant	East Surrey Regiment	First World War	9 April 1917
George Chafer	Private	East Yorkshire Regiment	First World War	3–4 June 1916
James Champion	Troop Sergeant Major	8th King's Royal Irish Hussars	Indian Mutiny	8 September 1858
George Channer	Captain	Bengal Staff Corps	Perak War	20 December 1875
John Chaplin	Ensign	67th Regiment of Foot	Third China War	21 August 1860
Edward Chapman	Corporal	Monmouthshire Regiment	Second World War	2 April 1945
John Chard	Lieutenant	Royal Engineers	Zulu War	22–23 January 1879
Edward Charlton	Guardsman	Irish Guards	Second World War	21 April 1945*
William Chase	Lieutenant	28th Native Infantry	Second Afghan War	16 August 1880
Chatta Singh	Sepoy	9th Bhopal Infantry	First World War	13 January 1916
Noel Chavasse (Note: Chavasse died of his wounds two days after the deed which merited his second Victoria Cross.)	Captain	Royal Army Medical Corps	First World War	9 August 1916; 31 July 1917 to 2 August 1917
Percy Cherry	Captain	26th Battalion, AIF	First World War	26 March 1917*
Leonard Cheshire	Squadron Leader	No. 35 Squadron RAF; No. 76 Squadron RAF; No. 617 Squadron RAF	Second World War	1940–1944
Chhelu Ram	Company Havildar Major	6th Rajputana Rifles	Second World War	19–20 April 1943*
George Chicken	Civilian	Indian Naval Brigade	Indian Mutiny	27 September 1858
Albert Chowne	Lieutenant	2/2nd Battalion, AIF	Second World War	25 March 1945*
Harry Christian	Private	King's Own (Royal Lancaster Regiment)	First World War	18 October 1915
John Christie	Lance Corporal	London Regiment	First World War	21–22 December 1917
William Clamp	Corporal	Green Howards	First World War	9 October 1917*
George Clare	Private	5th Royal Irish Lancers	First World War	28–29 November 1917*
James Clarke	Sergeant	Lancashire Fusiliers	First World War	2 November 1918
Leo Clarke	Acting Corporal	2nd Battalion, CEF	First World War	9 September 1916
William Clark-Kennedy	Lieutenant Colonel	24th Battalion, CEF	First World War	27–28 August 1918
John Clements	Corporal	Rimington's Guides	Second Boer War	24 February 1901
Henry Clifford	Lieutenant	Rifle Brigade (Prince Consort's Own)	Crimean War	5 November 1854
Herbert Clogstoun	Captain	19th Madras Native Infantry	Indian Mutiny	15 January 1859
Brett Cloutman	Acting Major	Corps of Royal Engineers	First World War	6 November 1918
Alexander Cobbe	Captain	King's African Rifles	Second Somaliland Expedition	6 October 1902
Hugh Cochrane	Lieutenant	86th Regiment of Foot	Indian Mutiny	1 April 1858
Hampden Cockburn	Lieutenant	Royal Canadian Dragoons	Second Boer War	7 November 1900
William Coffey	Private	34th Regiment of Foot	Crimean War	29 March 1855
Clifford Coffin	Temp. Brigadier General	Corps of Royal Engineers	First World War	6 July 1917
Nevill Coghill	Lieutenant	24th Regiment of Foot	Zulu War	22 January 1879*
John Coleman	Sergeant	97th Regiment of Foot	Crimean War	30 August 1855
Harold Colley	Acting Sergeant	Lancashire Fusiliers	First World War	25 August 1918*
Joseph Collin	Second Lieutenant	King's Own (Royal Lancaster Regiment)	First World War	9 April 1918*
John Collings-Wells	Acting Lieutenant Colonel	Bedfordshire Regiment	First World War	22–27 March 1918*
John Collins	Acting Corporal	Royal Welsh Fusiliers	First World War	31 October 1917
James Collis	Gunner	Royal Horse Artillery	Second Afghan War	27 July 1880
William Coltman	Lance Corporal	Prince of Wales's (North Staffordshire Regiment)	First World War	3–4 October 1918
Herbert Columbine	Private	Machine Gun Corps	First World War	22 March 1918*
Hugh Colvin	Second Lieutenant	Cheshire Regiment	First World War	20 September 1917
James Colvin	Lieutenant	Royal Engineers	Mohmand Campaign	16 September 1897
Thomas Colyer-Fergusson	Acting Captain	Northamptonshire Regiment	First World War	31 July 1917*
Robert Combe	Lieutenant	27th Battalion, CEF	First World War	3 May 1917*
John Commerell	Commander	HMS Weser	Crimean War	11 October 1855
Walter Congreve	Captain	Rifle Brigade	Second Boer War	15 December 1899
Billy Congreve	Major	Prince Consort's Own (Rifle Brigade)	First World War	6–20 July 1916
William Connolly	Gunner	Bengal Horse Artillery	Indian Mutiny	7 July 1857
John Connors	Private	3rd Regiment of Foot	Crimean War	8 September 1855
John Conolly	Lieutenant	49th Regiment of Foot	Crimean War	26 October 1854
John Cook	Captain	5th Gurkha Rifles	Second Afghan War	2 December 1878
Walter Cook	Private	42nd Regiment of Foot	Indian Mutiny	15 January 1859
Thomas Cooke	Private	8th Battalion, AIF	First World War	24–25 July 1916*
Edgar Cookson	Lieutenant Commander	HMS Comet	First World War	28 September 1915*
Edward Cooper	Sergeant	King's Royal Rifle Corps	First World War	16 August 1917
Henry Cooper	Boatswain	HMS Miranda	Crimean War	3 June 1855
James Cooper	Private	24th Regiment of Foot	Andaman Islands Expedition	7 May 1867
Frederick Coppins	Corporal	8th Battalion, CEF	First World War	9 August 1918
Frederick Corbett	Lieutenant	King's Royal Rifle Corps	Occupation of Egypt	5 August 1882
Jack Cornwell	First Class Boy	HMS Chester	First World War	31 May 1916*
Aubrey Cosens	Sergeant	Queen's Own Rifles of Canada	Second World War	22–23 February 1945*
William Cosgrove	Corporal	Royal Munster Fusiliers	First World War	26 April 1915
Edmond Costello	Lieutenant	22nd Punjab Infantry	Siege of Malakand	26 July 1897
William Cotter	Acting Corporal	Buffs (East Kent Regiment)	First World War	6 March 1916*
Cornelius Coughlan	Colour Sergeant	75th Regiment of Foot	Indian Mutiny	8 June 1857
Gustavus Coulson	Lieutenant	King's Own Scottish Borderers	Second Boer War	18 May 1901*
Jack Counter	Private	King's (Liverpool Regiment)	First World War	16 April 1918
Gabriel Coury	Second Lieutenant	Prince of Wales's Volunteers (South Lancashire Regiment)	First World War	8 August 1916
Charles Coverdale	Sergeant	Manchester Regiment	First World War	4 October 1917
Charles Cowley	Lieutenant Commander	Royal Naval Volunteer Reserve	First World War	24–25 April 1916*
Christopher Cox	Private	Bedfordshire Regiment	First World War	13 March 1917
James Craig	Colour Sergeant	Scots Fusiliers Guards	Crimean War	6 September 1855
John Craig	Second Lieutenant	Royal Scots Fusiliers	First World War	5 June 1917
Harry Crandon	Private	18th Royal Hussars	Second Boer War	4 July 1901
Garrett Creagh	Captain	Bombay Staff Corps	Second Afghan War	21 April 1879
Thomas Crean	Surgeon Captain	Imperial Light Horse	Second Boer War	18 December 1901
James Crichton	Private	Auckland Infantry Regiment	First World War	30 September 1918
John Crimmin	Surgeon	Bombay Medical Service	British rule in Burma	1 January 1889
Thomas Crisp	Skipper	Royal Naval Reserve	First World War	15 August 1917*
John Croak	Private	13th Battalion, CEF	First World War	8 August 1918*
Arthur Cross	Lance Corporal	Machine Gun Corps	First World War	25 March 1918
John Crowe	Second Lieutenant	Worcestershire Regiment	First World War	14 April 1918
Joseph Crowe	Lieutenant	78th Regiment of Foot	Indian Mutiny	12 August 1857
John Cruickshank	Flying Officer	No. 210 Squadron RAF	Second World War	17–18 July 1944
Robert Cruickshank	Private	London Scottish Regiment	First World War	1 May 1918
Victor Crutchley	Lieutenant	HMS Vindictive	First World War	9 May 1918
William Cubitt	Lieutenant	13th Bengal Native Infantry	Indian Mutiny	30 June 1857
Arthur Cumming	Lieutenant-Colonel	Frontier Force Regiment	Second World War	3 January 1942
William Cuninghame	Lieutenant	Rifle Brigade (Prince Consort's Own)	Crimean War	20 November 1854
John Cunningham	Lieutenant	East Yorkshire Regiment	First World War	13 November 1916
John Cunningham	Corporal	Prince of Wales's Leinster Regiment	First World War	12 April 1917*
William Currey	Private	53rd Battalion, AIF	First World War	1 September 1918
David Currie	Major	South Alberta Regiment	Second World War	18–20 August 1944
Albert Curtis	Private	East Surrey Regiment	Second Boer War	23 February 1900
Henry Curtis	Boatswain's Mate	Naval Brigade	Crimean War	18 June 1855
Horace Curtis	Sergeant	Royal Dublin Fusiliers	First World War	18 October 1918
Philip Curtis	Lieutenant	Duke of Cornwall's Light Infantry	Korean War	22–23 April 1951*
Roden Cutler	Lieutenant	Royal Australian Artillery	Second World War	19 June 1941 to 6 July 1941
James Dalton	Assistant Commissary	Commissariat and Transport Department	Zulu War	22–23 January 1879
Henry Dalziel	Driver	15th Battalion, AIF	First World War	4 July 1918
John Danaher	Trooper	Nourse's Horse	First Boer War	16 January 1881
Frederick Dancox	Private	Worcestershire Regiment	First World War	9 October 1917
Edward Daniel	Midshipman	HMS Diamond	Crimean War	18 October 1854
Harry Daniels	Company Sergeant Major	Prince Consort's Own (Rifle Brigade)	First World War	12 March 1915
Henry D'Arcy	Captain	Frontier Light Horse	Zulu War	3 July 1879
Wilbur Dartnell	Temp. Lieutenant	Royal Fusiliers	First World War	3 September 1915*
Darwan Negi	Naik	39th Garhwal Rifles	First World War	23–24 November 1914
John Daunt	Lieutenant	11th Bengal Native Infantry	Indian Mutiny	2 October 1857
Phillip Davey	Corporal	10th Battalion, AIF	First World War	28 June 1918
James Davies	Corporal	Royal Welsh Fusiliers	First World War	31 July 1917*
John Davies	Corporal	Prince of Wales's Volunteers (South Lancashire Regiment)	First World War	24 March 1918
Joseph Davies	Corporal	Royal Welsh Fusiliers	First World War	20 July 1916
Gronow Davis	Captain	Royal Regiment of Artillery	Crimean War	8 September 1855
James Davis	Private	42nd Regiment of Foot	Indian Mutiny	15 April 1858
James Dawson	Corporal	Corps of Royal Engineers	First World War	13 October 1915
George Day	Lieutenant	HMS Recruit	Crimean War	17 September 1855
Sidney Day	Corporal	Suffolk Regiment	First World War	26 August 1917
John Daykins	Acting Sergeant	York and Lancaster Regiment	First World War	20 October 1918
Raymond de Montmorency	Lieutenant	21st Lancers	Sudan Campaign	2 September 1898
Frank de Pass	Lieutenant	34th Prince Albert Victor's Own Poona Horse	First World War	24 November 1914*
Edmund de Wind	Second Lieutenant	Royal Irish Rifles	First World War	21 March 1918*
Donald Dean	Temp. Lieutenant	Queen's Own (Royal West Kent Regiment)	First World War	24–26 September 1918
Percy Dean	Lieutenant	Royal Naval Volunteer Reserve	First World War	22–23 April 1918
Maurice Dease	Lieutenant	Royal Fusiliers	First World War	23 August 1914*
Denis Dempsey	Private	10th Regiment of Foot	Indian Mutiny	12 August 1857, 14 March 1858
Tom Derrick	Sergeant	26th Brigade, AIF	Second World War	24 November 1943
Bernard Diamond	Sergeant	Bengal Horse Artillery	Indian Mutiny	28 September 1857
William Dick-Cunyngham	Lieutenant	92nd Regiment of Foot	Second Afghan War	13 December 1879
Collingwood Dickson	Lieutenant-Colonel	Royal Regiment of Artillery	Crimean War	17 October 1854
Robert Digby-Jones	Lieutenant	Royal Engineers	Second Boer War	6 January 1900
John Dimmer	Lieutenant	King's Royal Rifle Corps	First World War	12 November 1914
Thomas Dinesen	Private	42nd Battalion, CEF	First World War	12 August 1918
John Divane	Private	60th Rifles	Indian Mutiny	10 September 1857
Matthew Dixon	Captain	Royal Regiment of Artillery	Crimean War	17 April 1855
Claude Dobson	Commander	HM Coastal Motor Boat 31	North Russia Relief Force	18 August 1919
Frederick Dobson	Private	Coldstream Guards	First World War	28 September 1914
Dennis Donnini	Fusilier	Royal Scots Fusiliers	Second World War	18 January 1945*
Patrick Donohoe	Private	9th Queen's Royal Lancers	Indian Mutiny	28 September 1857
John Doogan	Private	1st King's Dragoon Guards	First Boer War	28 January 1881
George Dorrell	Battery Sergeant Major	Royal Horse Artillery	First World War	1 September 1914
Eric Dougall	Acting Captain	Royal Field Artillery	First World War	10 April 1918*
Charles Doughty-Wylie	Lieutenant Colonel	Royal Welsh Fusiliers	First World War	26 April 1915*
Campbell Douglas	Assistant surgeon	24th Regiment of Foot	Andaman Islands Expedition	7 May 1867
Henry Douglas	Lieutenant	Royal Army Medical Corps	Second Boer War	11 December 1899
Angus Douglas-Hamilton	Temp. Lieutenant Colonel	Queen's Own Cameron Highlanders	First World War	25–26 September 1915*
George Dowell	Lieutenant	Royal Marine Artillery	Crimean War	13 July 1855
William Dowling	Private	32nd Regiment of Foot	Indian Mutiny	4 July 1857, 27 September 1857
John Down	Ensign	57th Regiment of Foot	New Zealand Wars	2 October 1863
Robert Downie	Sergeant	Royal Dublin Fusiliers	First World War	23 October 1916
Alexis Doxat	Lieutenant	Imperial Yeomanry	Second Boer War	20 October 1900
Martin Doyle	Company Sergeant Major	Royal Munster Fusiliers	First World War	2 September 1918
Job Drain	Driver	Royal Field Artillery	First World War	26 August 1914
Alfred Drake	Corporal	Prince Consort's Own (Rifle Brigade)	First World War	23 November 1915*
Tom Dresser	Private	Green Howards	First World War	12 May 1917
George Drewry	Midshipman	Royal Naval Reserve	First World War	25 April 1915
Geoffrey Drummond	Lieutenant	Royal Naval Volunteer Reserve	First World War	9–10 May 1918
James Duffy	Private	Royal Inniskilling Fusiliers	First World War	27 December 1917
Thomas Duffy	Private	1st Madras European Fusiliers	Indian Mutiny	6 September 1857
Frederic Dugdale	Lieutenant	5th Royal Irish Lancers	Second Boer War	3 March 1901
James Dundas	Lieutenant	Bengal Engineers	Bhutan War	30 April 1865
John Dunlay	Lance Corporal	93rd Regiment of Foot	Indian Mutiny	16 November 1857
Alexander Dunn	Lieutenant	11th Hussars	Crimean War	25 October 1854
Robert Dunsire	Private	Royal Scots (Lothian Regiment)	First World War	26 September 1915
William Dunstan	Corporal	7th Battalion, AIF	First World War	9 August 1915
John Dunville	Second Lieutenant	1st Royal Dragoons	First World War	24–25 June 1917*
Alfred Durrant	Private	Rifle Brigade	Second Boer War	27 August 1900
Thomas Durrant	Sergeant	Corps of Royal Engineers	Second World War	27 March 1942*
Edward Dwyer	Private	East Surrey Regiment	First World War	20 April 1915
John Dwyer	Sergeant	Australian Machine Gun Corps	First World War	26 September 1917
Denis Dynon	Corporal	53rd Regiment of Foot	Indian Mutiny	2 October 1857
George Eardley	Acting Sergeant	King's Shropshire Light Infantry	Second World War	16 October 1944
John Edmondson	Corporal	9th Division, AIF	Second World War	13–14 April 1941*
Alexander Edwards	Sergeant	Seaforth Highlanders	First World War	31 July 1917
Frederick Edwards	Private	Duke of Cambridge's Own (Middlesex Regiment)	First World War	26 September 1916
Hughie Edwards	Pilot Officer	No. 105 Squadron RAF	Second World War	4 July 1941
Thomas Edwards	Private	Black Watch	Sudan Campaign	13 March 1884
Wilfred Edwards	Private	King's Own (Yorkshire Light Infantry)	First World War	16 August 1917
William Edwards	Lieutenant	Highland Light Infantry	Occupation of Egypt	13 September 1882
Ernest Egerton	Corporal	Sherwood Foresters	First World War	20 September 1917
Roland Elcock	Captain	Royal Scots (Lothian Regiment)	First World War	15 October 1918
Keith Elliott	Sergeant	22nd Battalion, NZEF	Second World War	15 July 1942
Neville Elliott-Cooper	Temp. Lieutenant Colonel	Royal Fusiliers	First World War	30 November 1917
Howard Elphinstone	Lieutenant	Corps of Royal Engineers	Crimean War	18 June 1855
Wilfrith Elstob	Temp. Lieutenant Colonel	Manchester Regiment	First World War	21 March 1918*
Frederick Elton	Brevet Major	55th Regiment of Foot	Crimean War	29 March 1855
James Emerson	Temp. Second Lieutenant	Royal Inniskilling Fusiliers	First World War	6 December 1917*
Henry Engleheart	Sergeant	10th Hussars	Second Boer War	13 March 1900
William English	Lieutenant	Scottish Horse	Second Boer War	3 July 1901
John Erskine	Sergeant	Cameronians (Scottish Rifles)	First World War	22 June 1916
Harold Ervine-Andrews	Captain	East Lancashire Regiment	Second World War	31 May 1940 to 1 June 1940
Eugene Esmonde	Lieutenant Commander	825 Naval Air Squadron	Second World War	12 February 1942
Thomas Esmonde	Captain	18th Regiment of Foot	Crimean War	18 June 1855
Arthur Evans	Lance-Sergeant	Lincolnshire Regiment	First World War	2 September 1918
George Evans	Company Sergeant Major	Manchester Regiment	First World War	30 July 1916
Lewis Evans	Acting Lieutenant Colonel	Black Watch (Royal Highlanders)	First World War	4 October 1917
Samuel Evans	Private	19th Regiment of Foot	Crimean War	13 April 1855
Donald Farmer	Sergeant	Queen's Own Cameron Highlanders	Second Boer War	13 December 1900
Joseph Farmer	Corporal	Royal Army Medical Corps	First Boer War	27 February 1881
Francis Farquharson	Lieutenant	42nd Regiment of Foot	Indian Mutiny	9 March 1858
John Farrell	Sergeant	17th Lancers	Crimean War	25 October 1854
William Faulds	Private	South African Infantry	First World War	18 July 1916
Fazal Din	Acting Naik	10th Baluch Regiment	Second World War	2 March 1945*
Edward Fegen	Acting Captain	HMS Jervis Bay	Second World War	5 November 1940*
Alfred Ffrench	Lieutenant	53rd Regiment of Foot	Indian Mutiny	16 November 1857
Alexander Fincastle	Lieutenant	16th Lancers	Tirah Campaign	17 August 1897
Norman Finch	Sergeant	Royal Marine Artillery	First World War	22–23 April 1918
George Findlater	Piper	Gordon Highlanders	Tirah Campaign	20 October 1897
George Findlay	Acting Major	Corps of Royal Engineers	First World War	4 November 1918
David Finlay	Lance Corporal	Black Watch (Royal Highlanders)	First World War	9 May 1915
Humphrey Firman	Lieutenant	SS Julnar	First World War	24–25 April 1916*
James Firth	Sergeant	Duke of Wellington's Regiment	Second Boer War	24 February 1900
Frederick Fisher	Lance Corporal	13th Battalion, CEF	First World War	22–23 April 1915*
Charles Fitzclarence	Captain	Royal Fusiliers	Second Boer War	14 October 1899
Richard Fitzgerald	Gunner	Bengal Horse Artillery	Indian Mutiny	28 September 1857
Andrew Fitzgibbon	Hospital Apprentice	67th Regiment of Foot	Third China War	21 August 1860
Francis Fitzpatrick	Private	94th Regiment of Foot	Basuto War	28 November 1879
Thomas Flawn	Private	94th Regiment of Foot	Basuto War	28 November 1879
Arthur Fleming-Sandes	Temp. Second Lieutenant	East Surrey Regiment	First World War	29 September 1915
Gordon Flowerdew	Temp. Lieutenant Colonel	Lord Strathcona's Horse (Royal Canadians)	First World War	31 March 1918*
Thomas Flynn	Drummer	64th Regiment of Foot	Indian Mutiny	28 November 1857
Henry Foote	Temp. Lieutenant Colonel	7th Royal Tank Regiment	Second World War	27 May 1942 to 15 June 1942
John Foote	Honorary Captain	Royal Canadian Army Chaplain Corps	Second World War	19 August 1942
James Forbes-Robertson	Acting Lieutenant Colonel	Border Regiment	First World War	11–12 April 1918
George Forrest	Lieutenant	Bengal Veterans Establishment	Indian Mutiny	11 May 1857
William Forshaw	Lieutenant	Manchester Regiment	First World War	7–9 August 1915
Samuel Forsyth	Sergeant	New Zealand Engineers	First World War	24 August 1918*
George Fosbery	Lieutenant	4th Bengal European Regiment	Umbeyla Campaign	30 October 1863
Charles Foss	Captain	Bedfordshire Regiment	First World War	12 March 1915
Edward Foster	Corporal	East Surrey Regiment	First World War	24 April 1917
Edmund Fowler	Private	26th Regiment of Foot	Zulu War	28 March 1879
Charles Fraser	Major	7th Queen's Own Hussars	Indian Mutiny	31 December 1858
Ian Fraser	Lieutenant	HMS XE3	Second World War	31 July 1945
John Freeman	Private	9th Queen's Royal Lancers	Indian Mutiny	10 October 1857
John French	Corporal	2/9th Battalion, AIF	Second World War	4 September 1942*
Bernard Freyberg	Temp. Lieutenant Colonel	Queen's (Royal West Surrey) Regiment	First World War	13 November 1916
Samuel Frickleton	Lance Corporal	New Zealand Rifle Brigade	First World War	7 June 1917
Cyril Frisby	Acting Captain	Coldstream Guards	First World War	27 September 1918
Wilfred Fuller	Lance Corporal	Grenadier Guards	First World War	12 March 1915
William Fuller	Lance Corporal	Welsh Regiment	First World War	14 September 1914
Christopher Furness	Lieutenant	Welsh Guards	Second World War	17–24 May 1940*
James Fynn	Private	South Wales Borderers	First World War	9 April 1916
