= List of Irish Victoria Cross recipients =

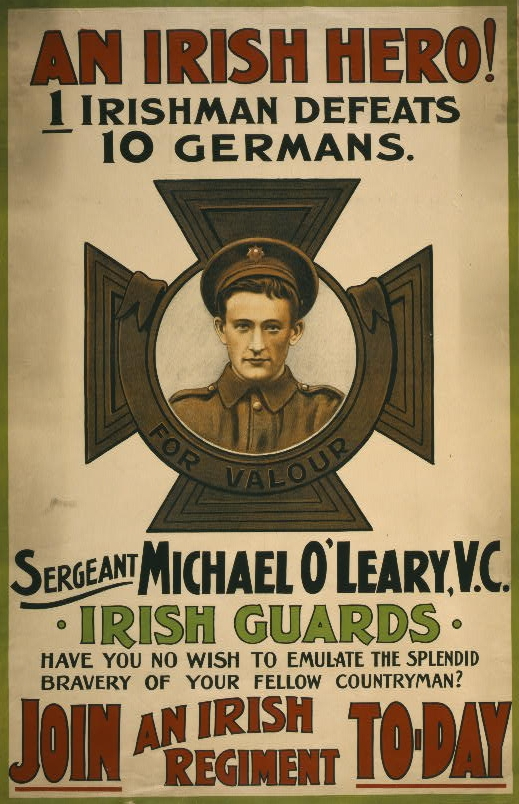
Army recruiting poster, 1915, featuring Michael O'Leary

List of Irish Victoria Cross recipients lists all recipients of the Victoria Cross (post-nominal letters "VC") born on the island of Ireland, together with the date and place of their VC action. The Victoria Cross is the highest war honour of the British Empire and the Commonwealth of Nations. The whole island of Ireland was part of the United Kingdom until 1922 when it was partitioned into Northern Ireland and the Irish Free State. On 18 April 1949, the Dominion of Ireland became the Republic of Ireland and left the Commonwealth as a result of the Republic of Ireland Act 1948 coming into effect. Despite this, citizens of the Republic of Ireland still enlist in the British Army and thus are eligible for the Victoria Cross and other British honours.

== Background ==
Established in 1856, the Victoria Cross has been awarded to service personnel for extraordinary valour and devotion to duty while facing a hostile force. Between 1858 and 1881 the Victoria Cross could also be awarded for actions taken "under circumstances of extreme danger" not in the face of the enemy. Six people (four Irish, one English and one Canadian) were awarded Victoria Crosses under this clause (one in 1866 during the Fenian raids, five for a single incident in 1867 during the Andaman Islands Expedition), until it was amended in 1881 to only allow acts "in the presence of the enemy". It was awarded to members of the British Armed Forces which included Irish service personnel until 1922. It is currently available to personnel of any rank in any service, and to allies serving under or with British Forces. It is the highest honour in the Commonwealth honours system, placed before all other orders, decorations and medals.

Both Catholic and Protestant officers and servicemen born in Ireland served alongside each other in the British Military. During the previous two centuries they had a common military background, and irrespective of class or creed many were decorated with the British highest award for valour. 30 Irish VCs were awarded in the Crimean War, 59 Irish VCs in the Indian Mutiny, 46 Irish VCs in numerous other British Empire campaigns between 1857 and 1914, 37 Irish VCs in World War I, and eight Irish VCs in World War II.

== Recipients ==
This along with the * indicates that the Victoria Cross was awarded posthumously

Name	Date of action	Conflict	Unit	Place of action	Notes
James Adams	1879	Second Afghan War	British Indian Army	Killa Kazi, Afghanistan	
Augustus Agar	1919	Baltic Campaign 1918	HM Coastal Motor Boat 4	Kronstadt, Russia	
John Alexander	1855	Crimean War	90th Regiment of Foot	Sevastopol, Crimea	
Charles Anderson	1858	Indian Rebellion of 1857	2nd Queen's Dragoon Guards	Sandila, India	
John Barry	1901*	Second Boer War	Royal Irish Regiment	Monument Hill, South Africa	
David Bell	1867	Andaman Islands Expedition	24th Regiment of Foot	Little Andaman, India	
Edward Bell	1854	Crimean War	23rd Regiment of Foot	Alma, Crimea	
Eric Bell	1916*	First World War	Royal Inniskilling Fusiliers	Thiepval, France	
William Beresford	1879	Anglo-Zulu War	9th Queen's Royal Lancers	Ulundi, South Africa	
James Bergin	1868	Abyssinian Expedition	33rd Regiment of Foot	Magdala, Abyssinia	
Edward Bingham	1916	First World War	HMS Nestor	Jutland, Denmark	
Abraham Boulger	1857	Indian Rebellion of 1857	84th Regiment of Foot	Lucknow, India	
George Boyd-Rochfort	1915	First World War	Scots Guards	Cambrin, France	
Joseph Bradshaw	1855	Crimean War	Rifle Brigade	Woronzoff Road, Crimea	
William Bradshaw	1857	Indian Rebellion of 1857	90th Regiment of Foot	Lucknow, India	
Edward Brown	1900	Second Boer War	14th King's Hussars	Geluk, South Africa	
Francis Brown	1857	Indian Rebellion of 1857	1st European Bengal Fusiliers	Narnaul, India	
Bryan Budd	2006*	War in Afghanistan	Parachute Regiment	Sangin, Afghanistan	
Hugh Burgoyne	1855	Crimean War	HMS Swallow	Sea of Azov, Crimea	
Nathaniel Burslem	1860	Second Opium War	67th Regiment of Foot	Taku Forts, China	
James Byrne	1858	Indian Rebellion of 1857	86th Regiment	Jhansi, India	
John Byrne	1854	Crimean War	68th Regiment of Foot	Inkerman, Crimea	
Thomas Byrne	1898	Mahdist War	21st Lancers	Omdurman, Sudan	
John Caffrey	1915	First World War	2nd York and Lancaster Regiment	La Brique, France	
Daniel Cambridge	1855	Crimean War	Royal Artillery	Sevastopol, Crimea	
Patrick Carlin	1858	Indian Rebellion of 1857	13th Regiment of Foot	Azumgurh, India	
Geoffrey Cather	1916*	First World War	Royal Irish Fusiliers	Hamel, France	
Alexander Cobbe	1902	Somaliland Campaign	King's African Rifles	Erego, Somaliland	
William Coffey	1855	Crimean War	34th Regiment of Foot	Sevastopol, Crimea	
Nevill Coghill	1879*	Anglo-Zulu War	24th Regiment of Foot	Isandhlwana South Africa	
Hugh Colvin	1917	First World War	Cheshire Regiment	Ypres, Belgium	
John Connors	1855	Crimean War	3rd Regiment of Foot	Sevastopol, Crimea	
John Conolly	1854	Crimean War	49th Regiment of Foot	Sevastopol, Crimea	
William Cosgrove	1915	First World War	Royal Munster Fusiliers	Gallipoli, Turkey	
Edmund Costello	1897	Siege of Malakand	22nd Punjab Infantry	Malakand, India	
Cornelius Coughlan	1857	Indian Rebellion of 1857	Gordon Highlanders	Delhi, India	
Garrett Creagh	1879	Second Afghan War	Bombay Staff Corps	Kam Dakka, Afghanistan	
Thomas Crean	1901	Second Boer War	Imperial Light Horse	Tygerkloof Spruit, South Africa	
James Crichton	1918	First World War	New Zealand Expeditionary Force	Crèvecœur, France	
John Crimmin	1889	Karenni Expedition	Bombay Medical Service	Lwekaw, Burma	
John Cunningham	1917*	First World War	Prince of Wales's Leinster Regiment	Bois-en-Hache, France	
John Danaher	1881	First Boer War	Nourse's Horse (Transvaal)	Elandsfontein, South Africa	
Maurice Dease	1914*	First World War	Royal Fusiliers	Mons, Belgium	
Denis Dempsey	1857	Indian Rebellion of 1857	10th Regiment of Foot	Lucknow, India	
Bernard Diamond	1857	Indian Rebellion of 1857	Bengal Horse Artillery	Bulandshahr, India	
Edmund De Wind	1918*	First World War	Royal Ulster Rifles	Groagie, France	
John Divane	1857	Indian Rebellion of 1857	60th Rifles	Delhi, India	
Patrick Donohoe	1857	Indian Rebellion of 1857	9th Queen's Royal Lancers	Bulandshahr, India	
John Doogan	1881	First Boer War	1st King's Dragoon Guards	Laing's Nek, South Africa	
William Dowling	1857	Indian Rebellion of 1857	32nd Regiment of Foot	Lucknow, India	
Martin Doyle	1918	First World War	Royal Munster Fusiliers	Reincourt, France	
James Duffy	1917	First World War	Royal Inniskilling Fusiliers	Kereina Peak, Palestine	
Thomas Duffy	1857	Indian Rebellion of 1857	102nd Madras Fusiliers	Lucknow, India	
John Dunlay	1857	Indian Rebellion of 1857	93rd Regiment of Foot	Lucknow, India	
Denis Dynon	1857	Indian Rebellion of 1857	53rd Regiment of Foot	Chota Behar, India	
Frederick Edwards	1916	First World War	Middlesex Regiment	Thiepval, France	
James Emerson	1917*	First World War	Royal Inniskilling Fusiliers	La Vacquerie, France	
William English	1901	Second Boer War	The Scottish Horse	Vlakfontein, South Africa	
Harold Ervine-Andrews	1940	Second World War	East Lancashire Regiment	Dunkirk, France	
Eugene Esmonde	1942*	Second World War	825 Naval Air Squadron	Straits of Dover	
Thomas Esmonde	1855	Crimean War	18th Regiment of Foot	Sevastopol, Crimea	
John Farrell	1854	Crimean War	17th Lancers	Balaklava, Crimea	
Edward Fegen	1940	Second World War	HMS Jervis Bay	Atlantic Ocean	
Charles FitzClarence	1899	Second Boer War	Royal Fusiliers	Mafeking, South Africa	
Richard Fitzgerald	1857	Indian Rebellion of 1857	Bengal Horse Artillery	Bulandshahr, India	
Andrew Fitzgibbon	1860	Second Opium War	67th Regiment of Foot	Taku Forts, China	
Francis Fitzpatrick	1879	Basuto War	94th Regiment of Foot	Sekukuni's Town, South Africa	
Thomas Flinn	1857	Indian Rebellion of 1857	64th Regiment of Foot	Cawnpore, India	
George Forrest	1857	Indian Rebellion of 1857	Bengal Veteran Establishment	Delhi, India	
Edmund Fowler	1879	Anglo-Zulu War	Cameronians (Scottish Rifles)	Zlobane Mountain, South Africa	
George Gardiner	1855	Crimean War	57th Regiment of Foot	Sebastopol, Crimea	
Donald Garland	1940*	Second World War	No. 12 Squadron RAF	Albert Canal, Belgium	
Stephen Garvin	1857	Indian Rebellion of 1857	60th Rifles	Delhi, India	
Peter Gill	1857	Indian Rebellion of 1857	Loodiana Regiment	Benares, India	
Henry Gore-Browne	1857	Indian Rebellion of 1857	32nd Regiment of Foot	Lucknow, India	
Charles Gough	1857	Indian Rebellion of 1857	5th Bengal European Light Cavalry	Lucknow, India	
Hugh Gough	1857	Indian Rebellion of 1857	1st Bengal European Light Cavalry	Lucknow, India	
John Gough	1903	Somaliland Campaign	Rifle Brigade	Daratoleh, Somaliland	
Thomas Grady	1854	Crimean War	4th Regiment of Foot	Sevastopol, Crimea	
Patrick Graham	1857	Indian Rebellion of 1857	90th Regiment of Foot	Lucknow, India	
Peter Grant	1857	Indian Rebellion of 1857	93rd Regiment of Foot	Lucknow, India	
Patrick Green	1857	Indian Rebellion of 1857	75th Regiment of Foot	Delhi, India	
William Griffiths	1867	Andaman Islands Expedition	24th Regiment of Foot	Little Andaman, India	
Thomas Hackett	1857	Indian Rebellion of 1857	23rd Regiment of Foot	Lucknow, India	
Frederick Hall	1915*	First World War	8th (Winnipeg Rifles) Battalion	Ypres, Belgium	
Walter Hamilton	1879	Second Afghan War	Staff Corps and Corps of Guides	Futtehabad, Afghanistan	
Robert Hanna	1917	First World War	29th Battalion, CEF	Lens, France	
John Harrison	1857	Indian Rebellion of 1857	Naval Brigade	Lucknow, India	
Reginald Hart	1879	Second Afghan War	Royal Engineers	Bazar Valley, Afghanistan	
Henry Hartigan	1857	Indian Rebellion of 1857	9th Queen's Royal Lancers	Delhi, India	
Frederick Harvey	1917	First World War	Lord Strathcona's Horse	Guyencourt, France	
Robert Hawthorne	1857	Indian Rebellion of 1857	52nd Regiment of Foot	Delhi, India	
Samuel Hill	1857	Indian Rebellion of 1857	90th Regiment	Lucknow, India	
John Holland	1916	First World War	Prince of Wales's Leinster Regiment	Guillemont, France	
Thomas Hughes	1916	First World War	Connaught Rangers	Guillemont, France	
Charles Irwin	1857	Indian Rebellion of 1857	53rd Regiment of Foot	Lucknow, India	
James Jackman	1941*	Second World War	Royal Northumberland Fusiliers	Tobruk, Libya	
Edward Jennings	1857	Indian Rebellion of 1857	Bengal Artillery	Lucknow, India	
Robert Johnston	1899	Second Boer War	Imperial Light Horse (Natal)	Elandslaagte, South Africa	
Henry Jones	1855	Crimean War	7th Regiment	Sebastopol, Crimea	
Thomas Kavanagh	1857	Indian Rebellion of 1857	Bengal Civil Service	Lucknow, India	
Richard Keatinge	1858	Indian Rebellion of 1857	Bombay Artillery	Chundairee, India	
Richard Kelliher	1943	Second World War	Australian Imperial Force	New Guinea, Pacific	
Henry Kelly	1916	First World War	Duke of Wellington's Regiment	Le Sars, France	
William Kenealy	1915	First World War	Lancashire Fusiliers	Gallipoli, Turkey	
James Kenny	1857	Indian Rebellion of 1857	53rd Regiment of Foot	Lucknow, India	
William Kenny	1914	First World War	Gordon Highlanders	Ypres, Belgium	
William Kenny	1920*	Waziristan Campaign	39th Garhwal Rifles	Kot Kai, India	
George Lambert	1857	Indian Rebellion of 1857	84th Regiment of Foot	Oonao, India	
Thomas Lane	1860	Second Opium War	67th Regiment of Foot	Taku Forts, China	
Thomas Laughnan	1857	Indian Rebellion of 1857	Bengal Artillery	Lucknow, India	
Samuel Lawrence	1857	Indian Rebellion of 1857	32nd Regiment of Foot	Lucknow, India	
Edward Leach	1879	Second Afghan War	Royal Engineers	Maidanah, Afghanistan	
William Leet	1879	Anglo-Zulu War	13th Regiment of Foot	Inhlobana, South Africa	
William Lendrim	1855	Crimean War	Royal Engineers	Sevastopol, Crimea	
Owen Lloyd	1893	Kachin Expedition	Army Medical Service	Fort Sima, Burma	
David Lord	1944*	Second World War	No. 271 Squadron RAF	Battle of Arnhem, Netherlands	
Charles Lucas	1854	Crimean War	HMS Hecla	Åland, Finland	
John Lucas	1861	First Taranaki War	40th Regiment of Foot	New Zealand	
John Lyons	1855	Crimean War	19th Regiment of Foot	Sevastopol, Crimea	
Harry Lyster	1858	Indian Rebellion of 1857	72nd Bengal Native Infantry	Calpee, India	
Ambrose Madden	1854	Crimean War	41st Regiment	Little Inkerman, Crimea	
James Magennis	1945	Second World War	HMS XE3	Johore Straits, Singapore	
Michael Magner	1868	Abyssinian Expedition	33rd Regiment of Foot	Magdala, Abyssinia	
Patrick Mahoney	1857*	Indian Rebellion of 1857	102nd Madras Fusiliers	Mungulwar, India	
William Manley	1864	New Zealand Wars	Royal Artillery	Tauranga, New Zealand	
Edward Mannock	1918*	First World War	No. 74 Squadron RAF	Western Front	
James Masterson	1900	Second Boer War	Devonshire Regiment	Ladysmith, South Africa	
Frederick Maude	1855	Crimean War	3rd Regiment of Foot	Sevastopol, Crimea	
Charles McCorrie	1855	Crimean War	57th Regiment of Foot	Sevastopol, Crimea	
William McFadzean	1916*	First World War	Royal Ulster Rifles	Thiepval Wood, France	
John McGovern	1857	Indian Rebellion of 1857	101st Regiment of Foot	Delhi, India	
James McGuire	1857	Indian Rebellion of 1857	101st Regiment of Foot	Delhi, India	
Patrick McHale	1857	Indian Rebellion of 1857	5th Regiment of Foot	Lucknow, India	
Peter McManus	1857	Indian Rebellion of 1857	5th Regiment of Foot	Lucknow, India	
Bernard McQuirt	1858	Indian Rebellion of 1857	95th Regiment of Foot	Rowa, India	
William McWheeney	1854	Crimean War	44th Regiment of Foot	Sevastopol, Crimea	
Martin Moffat	1918	First World War	Prince of Wales's Leinster Regiment	Ledeghem, Belgium	
Arthur Moore	1857	Anglo-Persian War	3rd Bombay Light Cavalry	Khushab, Persia	
Hans Moore	1877	Cape Frontier Wars	88th Regiment	Komgha, South Africa	
Robert Morrow	1915*	First World War	Royal Irish Fusiliers	Messines, Belgium	
John Moyney	1917	First World War	Irish Guards	Broembeek, Belgium	
Andrew Moynihan	1855	Crimean War	90th Regiment of Foot	Redan, Crimea	
Patrick Mullane	1880	Second Afghan War	Royal Horse Artillery	Maiwand, Afghanistan	
Michael Murphy	1858	Indian Rebellion of 1857	17th Lancers	Azumgurh, India	
Thomas Murphy	1867	Andaman Islands Expedition	24th Regiment of Foot	Little Andaman, India	
James Murray	1881	First Boer War	88th Regiment	Elandsfontein, South Africa	
John Murray	1864	New Zealand Wars	68th Regiment of Foot	Tauranga, New Zealand	
Patrick Mylott	1857	Indian Rebellion of 1857	84th Regiment of Foot	Lucknow, India	
Michael John O'Leary	1917	First World War	Irish Guards	Cuinchy, France	
William Nash	1858	Indian Rebellion of 1857	Rifle Brigade	Lucknow, India	
David Nelson	1914	First World War	Royal Artillery	Néry, France	
Claude Nunney	1918*	First World War	38th Battalion, CEF	Drocourt-Quéant Line, France	
George Nurse	1899	Second Boer War	Royal Field Artillery	Colenso, South Africa	
Luke O'Connor	1854	Crimean War	23rd Regiment of Foot	Alma, Crimea	
Timothy O'Hea	1866	Fenian raids on Canada	Rifle Brigade	Danville, Quebec, Canada	
Michael John	1915	First World War	Irish Guards	Cuinchy, France	
William Olpherts	1857	Indian Rebellion of 1857	Bengal Artillery	Lucknow, India	
Martin O'Meara	1916	First World War	1st Division (Australia)	Pozières, France	
Michael O'Rourke	1917	First World War	7th Battalion, CEF	Hill 70, France	
Gerald O'Sullivan	1915	First World War	Royal Inniskilling Fusiliers	Gallipoli, Turkey	
Edmund O'Toole	1879	Anglo-Zulu War	Frontier Light Horse	Ulundi, South Africa	
James Owens	1854	Crimean War	49th Regiment of Foot	Sevastopol, Crimea	
John Park	1854	Crimean War	77th Regiment of Foot	Alma, Crimea	
James Pearson	1858	Indian Rebellion of 1857	86th Regiment of Foot	Jhansi, India	
Dighton Probyn	1857	Indian Rebellion of 1857	2nd Punjab Cavalry	Agra, India	
Joseph Prosser	1855	Crimean War	1st Regiment of Foot	Sevastopol, Crimea	
John Purcell	1857	Indian Rebellion of 1857	9th Queen's Royal Lancers	Delhi, India	
Robert Quigg	1916	First World War	Royal Ulster Rifles	Hamel, France	
Hamilton Reed	1899	Second Boer War	Royal Field Artillery	Colenso, South Africa	
James Reynolds	1879	Anglo-Zulu War	Army Medical Service	Rorke's Drift, Natal, South Africa	
George Richardson	1859	Indian Rebellion of 1857	34th Regiment of Foot	Kewane Trans-Gogra, India	
Richard Ridgeway	1879	Naga Hills Expedition	Bengal Staff Corps	Konoma, India	
Frederick Roberts	1899*	Second Boer War	King's Royal Rifle Corps	Colenso, South Africa	
Clement Robertson	1917*	First World War	Queen's Royal Regiment	Zonnebeke, Belgium	
Patrick Roddy	1858	Indian Rebellion of 1857	Bengal Army	Kuthirga, India	
Robert Rogers	1860	Second Opium War	44th Regiment of Foot	Taku Forts, China	
George Roupell	1915	First World War	East Surrey Regiment	Hill 60, Belgium	
John Ryan	1857	Indian Rebellion of 1857	102nd Madras Fusiliers	Lucknow, India	
John Ryan	1863	New Zealand Wars	65th Regiment of Foot	Cameron Town, New Zealand	
Miles Ryan	1857	Indian Rebellion of 1857	101st Regiment of Foot	Delhi, India	
Robert Scott	1900	Second Boer War	Manchester Regiment	Natal, South Africa	
John Sinnott	1857	Indian Rebellion of 1857	84th Regiment of Foot	Lucknow, India	
Michael Sleavon	1858	Indian Rebellion of 1857	Royal Engineers	Jhansi, India	
Frederick Smith	1864	New Zealand Wars	43rd Regiment of Foot	Tauranga, New Zealand	
Philip Smith	1855	Crimean War	17th Regiment of Foot	Sevastopol, Crimea	
James Somers	1915	First World War	Royal Inniskilling Fusiliers	Gallipoli, Turkey	
Dudley Stagpoole	1863	New Zealand Wars	57th Regiment of Foot	Poutoko, New Zealand	
John Sullivan	1855	Crimean War	Naval Brigade	Sevastopol, Crimea	
William Temple	1863	New Zealand Wars	Royal Artillery	Rangiriri, New Zealand	
James Travers	1857	Indian Rebellion of 1857	2nd Bengal Native Infantry	Indore, India	
Mark Walker	1854	Crimean War	30th Regiment of Foot	Inkerman, Crimea	
Joseph Ward	1858	Indian Rebellion of 1857	8th King's Royal Irish Hussars	Gwalior, India	
George White	1879	Second Afghan War	92nd Regiment of Foot	Charasiah, Afghanistan	
Alexander Wright	1855	Crimean War	77th Regiment of Foot	Sevastopol, Crimea	
Alexander Young	1901	Second Boer War	Cape Police	Ruiterskraal, South Africa	

== See also ==
- Irish in the British Armed Forces
