= Richard Ridgeway =

Irish soldier

Colonel Richard Ridgeway VC CB
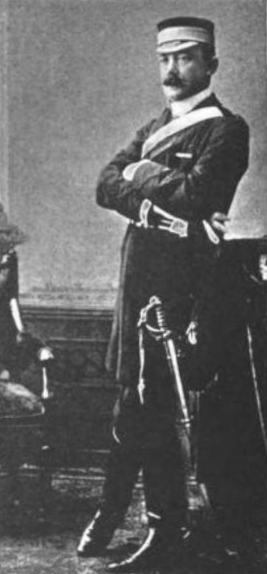
- Born: 18 August 1848; Oldcastle, County Meath, Ireland
- Died: 11 October 1924 (aged 76); Harrogate, Yorkshire, England
- Burial place: Lawnswood crematorium, Leeds, Yorkshire
- Military career
- Allegiance: United Kingdom
- Branch: British Indian Army
- Service years: 1868–
- Rank: Colonel
- Awards: Victoria Cross; Order of the Bath

Colonel Richard Kirby Ridgeway VC CB (18 August 1848 – 11 October 1924) was an Irish recipient of the Victoria Cross, the highest and most prestigious award for gallantry in the face of the enemy that can be awarded to British and Commonwealth forces.

== Biography ==
Ridgeway was born on 18 August 1848 in Oldcastle, County Meath, Ireland. He was commissioned into the British Army on 8 January 1868, and promoted to lieutenant on 14 February 1870.

=== Victoria Cross ===
On 22 November 1879, he was 31 years old, and a captain in the Bengal Staff Corps, 44th Gurkha Rifles (later 1/8th Gurkha Rifles), British Indian Army, during the Naga Hills Expedition. On that date, during the final assault on Konoma, Eastern Frontier of India, under heavy fire from the enemy, Captain Ridgeway rushed up to a barricade and attempted to tear down the planking surrounding it to enable him to effect an entrance. While doing this he was wounded severely in the right shoulder.

=== Later career ===
He was appointed assistant adjutant-general of the Peshawar district, part of the Punjab Command, on 29 April 1895, and was promoted to the rank of colonel on 8 January 1898. After an extended furlough back home, he resigned in early 1900, and did not return to India.

He died at the age of 76 in Harrogate, Yorkshire on 11 October 1924.

== See also ==
- List of Brigade of Gurkhas recipients of the Victoria Cross

== Notes and references ==
- The Register of the Victoria Cross (1981, 1988 and 1997)
- Clarke, Brian D. H. (1986). "A register of awards to Irish-born officers and men". The Irish Sword. XVI (64): 185–287.
- Ireland's VCs ISBN 1-899243-00-3 (Dept of Economic Development, 1995)
- Monuments to Courage (David Harvey, 1999)
- Irish Winners of the Victoria Cross (Richard Doherty & David Truesdale, 2000)
