= Owen Lloyd (British Army officer) =

Irish Victoria Cross recipient

Major-General Sir Owen Lloyd VC KCB
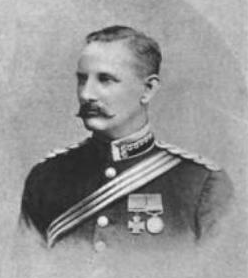
- Lloyd in c. 1904
- Born: Owen Edward Pennefather Lloyd; 1 January 1854; County Roscommon, Ireland
- Died: 5 July 1941 (aged 87); St Leonards-on-Sea, Sussex, England
- Burial place: Kensal Green Cemetery
- Military career
- Allegiance: United Kingdom
- Branch: British Army
- Rank: Major-General
- Unit: Royal Army Medical Corps
- Conflicts: Kachin Hills Expedition
- Awards: Victoria Cross; Knight Commander of the Order of the Bath

Sir Owen Edward Pennefather Lloyd VC KCB (1 January 1854 – 5 July 1941) was an Irish-born officer in the British Army and a recipient of the Victoria Cross, the highest and most prestigious award for gallantry in the face of the enemy that can be awarded to British and Commonwealth forces.

== Details ==
Lloyd was born in County Roscommon and educated at Fermoy College and Queen's University, Cork (now University College Cork). He joined the British Army Medical Service, later the Royal Army Medical Corps (RAMC), in 1878. He was in the Zulu War in 1879 and the Transvaal War of 1881–82 before being sent, with the rank of Surgeon-Major, to join the Kachin Hills Expedition in Burma (now Myanmar). There on 6 January 1893 the following deed took place for which he was awarded the VC:

During the attack on the Sima Post by Kachins, on the 6th January last, Surgeon-Major Lloyd on hearing that the Commanding Officer, Captain Morton (who had left the fort to visit a picket about 80 yards distant) was wounded, at once ran out to his assistance under a close and heavy fire, accompanied by Subadar Matab Singh.
On reaching the wounded Officer, Surgeon-Major Lloyd sent Subadar Matab Singh back for further assistance, and remained with Captain Morton till the Subadar returned with five men of the Magwe Battalion of Military Police, when he assisted in carrying Captain Morton back to the fort, where that Officer died a few minutes afterwards.
The enemy were within ten or fifteen paces keeping up a heavy fire which killed three men of the picket, and also Bugler Purna Singh. This man accompanied Captain Morton from the fort, showed great gallantry in supporting him in his arms when wounded, and was shot while helping to carry him back to the fort.
(The Native Officer and five sepoys above alluded to have been awarded the Order of Merit.)

Lloyd took command of the fort after death of Captain Morton. In 1894–95 he was medical officer to the Franco-British boundary commission on the Mekong River that decided the Thai-Lao border after the Franco-Siamese conflict, and in 1898–99 he was medical officer to British-Chinese boundary commission on the Burma frontier. Later he was Principal Medical Officer in India and then in South Africa, served in World War I (mentioned in despatches), and was Colonel Commandant of the RAMC 1922–24 with the rank of major-general.

Lloyd was appointed CB in the 1910 Birthday Honours and was promoted to Knight Commander of the Order (KCB) in the 1923 Birthday Honours. He died at St Leonards-on-Sea, Sussex, on 5 July 1941.

== The medal ==
Lloyd's Victoria Cross is displayed at the Army Medical Services Museum (Aldershot, England).

== Sources ==
- The Register of the Victoria Cross (1981, 1988 and 1997)
- Clarke, Brian D. H. (1986). "A register of awards to Irish-born officers and men". The Irish Sword. XVI (64): 185–287.
- Ireland's VCs ISBN 1-899243-00-3 (Dept of Economic Development, 1995)
- Monuments to Courage (David Harvey, 1999)
- Irish Winners of the Victoria Cross (Richard Doherty & David Truesdale, 2000)
