= William Lendrim =

- Born: 1 January 1830; Carrick-on-Shannon, County Leitrim, Ireland
- Died: 28 November 1891 (aged 61); Camberley, Surrey
- Burial place: Royal Military Academy Cemetery, Camberley
- Military career
- Allegiance: United Kingdom
- Branch: British Army
- Service years: 1847–1871
- Rank: Sergeant-Major
- Units: Royal Engineers
- Conflicts: Crimean War; Indian Mutiny
- Awards: Victoria Cross Médaille militaire

William James Lendrim VC (1 January 1830 – 28 November 1891) was an Irish recipient of the Victoria Cross, the highest and most prestigious award for gallantry in the face of the enemy that can be awarded to British and Commonwealth forces.

== Details ==
He was 25 years old, and a corporal in the Royal Sappers and Miners, British Army during the Crimean War when the following deed took place for which he was awarded the VC.

On 14 February 1855 during the Siege of Sevastopol, Crimea, Corporal Lendrim superintended 150 French Chasseurs in building No. 9 Battery left attack and replacing the whole of the capsized gabions under a heavy fire. On 11 April he got on top of a magazine under fire, and extinguished burning sandbags, making good the breach. On 20 April he was one of four volunteers who destroyed the screen which the Russians had erected to conceal their advance rifle-pits.

== Further information ==
He later achieved the rank of Sergeant-Major, and worked at the Staff College, Frimley. He married Louisa and had 12 children – all alive in 1881. William died Camberley, Surrey, 28 November 1891 and is buried at the Royal Military Academy Cemetery, plot 182.

== The medal ==
His Victoria Cross is displayed at the Royal Engineers Museum (Chatham, England).

== Masonic interests ==
He was initiated in Lodge of the Thirty-seventh Company of Royal Engineers, No. 963 on 8 July 1863 and passed on 12 August the same year. As the Lodge warrant was withdrawn on 22 February 1864, he was raised in United Chatham Lodge of Benevolence, No. 184, Chatham on 12 April 1864, resigning in November the same year. He was the first Junior Warden of the Albert Edward Lodge No. 1714 chartered by the United Grand Lodge of England in the province of Surrey in 1877, and its third Worshipful Master in 1879. He was appointed to Provincial Grand Steward in the province of Surrey in 1878, and Provincial Grand Pursuivant of Surrey in 1881

== Sources ==
Listed in order of publication year

- Fitchew, Peter (1977). "History of the First Hundred Years 1877 – 1977". History of the Albert Edward Lodge, First 100 Years: 13, 24–25.
- The Register of the Victoria Cross (1981, 1988 and 1997)
- Clarke, Brian D. H. (1986). "A register of awards to Irish-born officers and men". The Irish Sword. XVI (64): 185–287.
- Ireland's VCs ISBN 1-899243-00-3 (Department of Economic Development, 1995)
- Monuments to Courage (David Harvey, 1999)
- Irish Winners of the Victoria Cross (Richard Doherty & David Truesdale, 2000)
