= Abraham Boulger =

Irish recipient of the Victoria Cross

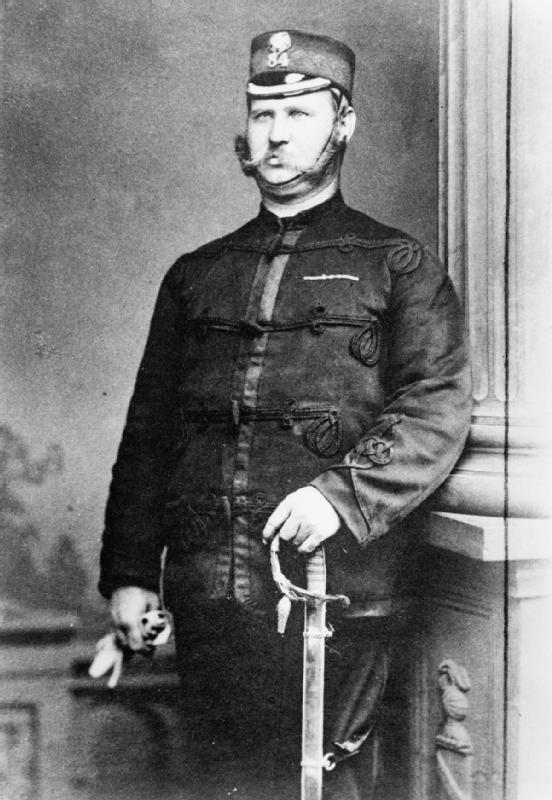
- Boulger when Quartermaster, 84th Foot
- Born: 4 September 1835; Kilcullen, County Kildare
- Died: 23 January 1900 (aged 64); Moate, County Westmeath
- Burial place: Ballymore Churchyard, County Westmeath
- Military career
- Allegiance: United Kingdom
- Branch: British Army
- Rank: Lieutenant Colonel
- Units: 84th Regiment of Foot; York and Lancaster Regiment
- Conflicts: Indian Mutiny; 1882 Anglo-Egyptian War
- Awards: Victoria Cross

Lieutenant Colonel Abraham Boulger VC (4 September 1835, in Kilcullen, County Kildare – 23 January 1900) was an Irish recipient of the Victoria Cross, the highest and most prestigious award for gallantry in the face of the enemy that can be awarded to British and Commonwealth forces.

In 1857 Boulger was serving with the 84th Regiment of Foot (later 2nd Bn, The York and Lancaster Regiment), during the Indian Mutiny and was involved in the Siege of Cawnpore and the Relief of Lucknow. He was a 21 year old Lance-Corporal when he was awarded the VC for the following service:

Lance-Corporal Abraham Boulger
Date of Acts of Bravery, from 12th July to 25th September, 1857
For distinguished bravery and forwardness; a skirmisher, in all the twelve actions fought between 12th July, and 25th September, 1857. (Extract from Field Force Orders of the late Major-General Havelock, dated 17 October 1857.)

Boulger became sergeant major of the 84th Foot, and in November 1872 was commissioned as the Regiment's Quartermaster. He served in the 1882 Anglo-Egyptian War with his regiment, now titled the York and Lancaster Regiment. While remaining quartermaster, he was promoted to honorary captain in November, 1882, and honorary Major in March 1883, 'in recognition of his services during the recent campaign in Egypt'. He retired with the honorary rank of Lieutenant-Colonel in November 1887.

Boulger died in Moate, County Westmeath, Ireland, on 23 January 1900, aged 64. His Victoria Cross is displayed at the York & Lancaster Regiment Museum in Rotherham, England.

== Listed in order of publication ==
- The Register of the Victoria Cross (1981, 1988 and 1997)
- Clarke, Brian D. H. (1986). "A register of awards to Irish-born officers and men". The Irish Sword. XVI (64): 185–287.
- Ireland's VCs (Dept of Economic Development, 1995)
- Monuments to Courage (David Harvey, 1999)
- Irish Winners of the Victoria Cross (Richard Doherty & David Truesdale, 2000)
