= John Divane =

Recipient of the Victoria Cross

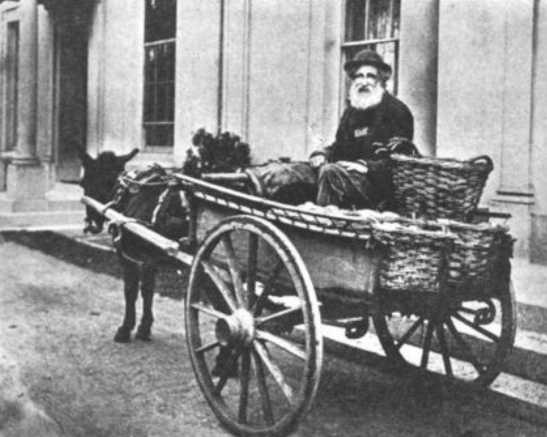
- Born: November 1823; Carrabane, County Galway, Ireland
- Died: 1 December 1888 (aged 65); Penzance, Cornwall, England
- Burial place: Penzance Cemetery
- Military career
- Allegiance: United Kingdom
- Branch: British Army
- Rank: Private
- Units: 60th Rifles
- Conflicts: Indian Mutiny
- Awards: Victoria Cross

John Divane (VC; November 1823 – 1 December 1888), also known as Devine and Duane, was an Irish recipient of the Victoria Cross, the highest and most prestigious award for gallantry in the face of the enemy that can be awarded to British and Commonwealth forces.

== Biography ==
He was born in Carrabane, County Galway and died at 1 New Street, Penzance, Cornwall on 1 December 1888 and, was buried in an unmarked grave in Penzance cemetery. A headstone was installed in 1995 during a ceremony attended by Field Marshal Lord Bramall and in 2015 a plaque was unveiled at 35 New Street, Penzance.

Apparently only semi-literate, Duane put "the tail" on the wrong side of his "u" on his signature, which led to confusion about the correct spelling of his surname in official records. Duane is one of several soldiers from Carrabane (modern Kilconierin-Lickerrig-Clostoken parish) to fight with distinction in theatres of war throughout the nineteenth century.

== Victoria Cross award ==
He was approximately 34 years old, and a private in the 1st Battalion, 60th Rifles (later The King's Royal Rifle Corps), British Army during the Indian Mutiny when the following deed took place on 10 September 1857 at Delhi, India for which he was awarded the VC:

For distinguished gallantry in heading a successful charge made by the Beeloochee and Seikh Troops on one of the Enemy's trenches before Delhi, on the 10th of September, 1857. He leaped out of our trenches, closely followed by the Native Troops, and was shot down from the top of the Enemy's breastworks. Elected by the Privates of the Regiment.

== Sources ==
- The Register of the Victoria Cross (1981, 1988 and 1997).
- Clarke, Brian D. H. (1986). "A register of awards to Irish-born officers and men". The Irish Sword. XVI (64): 185–287.
- Ireland's VCs (Dept of Economic Development, 1995).
- Monuments to Courage (David Harvey, 1999).
- Irish Winners of the Victoria Cross (Richard Doherty & David Truesdale, 2000).
