= Frederick Jeremiah Edwards =

Irish recipient of the Victoria Cross

Frederick Jeremiah Edwards VC
- Born: 3 October 1894; Queenstown, County Cork, Ireland
- Died: 9 March 1964 (aged 69); Richmond, Surrey, England
- Military career
- Allegiance: United Kingdom
- Branch: British Army
- Rank: Corporal
- Units: 12th Battalion, The Middlesex Regiment
- Conflicts: World War I – Battle of the Somme
- Awards: Victoria Cross

Frederick Jeremiah Edwards VC (3 October 1894 – 9 March 1964) was an Irish recipient of the Victoria Cross, the highest and most prestigious award for gallantry in the face of the enemy that can be awarded to British and Commonwealth forces.

== Biography ==
Edwards was born in Queenstown (now named Cobh), County Cork, Ireland. As a boy he attended the Royal Hibernian Military School in Dublin. He was 21 years old, and a private in the 12th Battalion, The Middlesex Regiment (Duke of Cambridge's Own), British Army during the First World War, and was awarded the VC for his deeds on 26 September 1916 in the Battle of Thiepval Ridge at Thiepval, France: part of the line was held up by machine-gun fire and all the officers had become casualties. There was confusion and indication of retirement. Private Edwards, grasping the situation and on his own initiative, dashed out towards the gun, which he knocked out with his bombs. This very gallant act, coupled with great presence of mind and disregard of personal danger, made further advance possible and cleared up a dangerous situation.

He was later promoted to corporal and after leaving the British Army he was forced to sell his medal to make ends meet. He died on 9 March 1964 at the Royal Star and Garter Home in Richmond (then in Surrey, now in London) and is buried in Richmond Cemetery.

His Victoria Cross was displayed at the National Army Museum, Chelsea, England.

== In popular culture ==
Edwards was portrayed by Adam Webb in the 2006 BBC docudrama The Somme – From Defeat to Victory, a film made to commemorate the 90th anniversary of the Battle of the Somme.

== Sources ==
Listed in order of publication year

- The Register of the Victoria Cross (1981, 1988 and 1997)
- Clarke, Brian D. H. (1986). "A register of awards to Irish-born officers and men". The Irish Sword. XVI (64): 185–287.
- Ireland's VCs (Department of Economic Development, 1995)
- Doherty, Richard; Truesdale, David (July 2000). Irish Winners of the Victoria Cross. Four Courts Press. ISBN 978-1-85182-442-7.
- Harvey, David (2000). Monuments to Courage. Naval & Military Press Ltd. ISBN 1-84342-356-1.
