= Thomas Byrne (VC) =

Recipient of the Victoria Cross (1866–1944)

Thomas Byrne VC
- Byrne circa 1899
- Born: December 1866; York Street, Dublin, Ireland
- Died: 15 March 1944 (aged 77); Canterbury, England
- Burial place: Canterbury City Cemetery; 51.285715°N 1.064139°E
- Military career
- Allegiance: United Kingdom
- Branch: British Army
- Service years: 1887 - 1909
- Rank: Private
- Conflicts: Reconquest of Sudan; Second Boer War
- Awards: Victoria Cross

Thomas Byrne, VC (December 1866 Dublin – 15 March 1944) was an Irish British Army soldier. He was the recipient of the Victoria Cross (VC), the highest and most prestigious award for gallantry in the face of the enemy that can be awarded to British and Commonwealth forces.

== Deed ==
He was 31 years old, and a private in the 21st Lancers (Empress of India's), British Army, during the reconquest of Sudan when the following deed took place for which he was awarded the VC:

On 2 September 1898 at the Battle of Omdurman, Sudan, Private Byrne turned back in the middle of the charge of the 21st Lancers and went to the assistance of a lieutenant of the Royal Horse Guards who was wounded, dismounted, disarmed and being attacked by several Dervishes. Private Byrne, already wounded, attacked these Dervishes, received a second severe wound and by his gallant conduct enabled the officer to escape.

Winston Churchill, an eye-witness, described it as the bravest act he had ever seen performed.

== Honours ==
Byrne's medal entitlement was:

Ribbon	Description	Notes
	Victoria Cross (VC)	2 September 1898
	Queen's Sudan Medal	
	Queen's South Africa Medal	With clasps "Cape Colony", "Orange Free State", "Transvaal"
	King George VI Coronation Medal	12 May 1937; All living VC recipients received this medal
	Army Long Service and Good Conduct Medal	
	Khedive's Sudan Medal	With clasp "Khartoum"

- His Medals (including a replacement VC) were sold at Auction for £40,000 at David Lay Auctioneers in Penzance, Cornwall on 25 August 2015.

== Later life ==
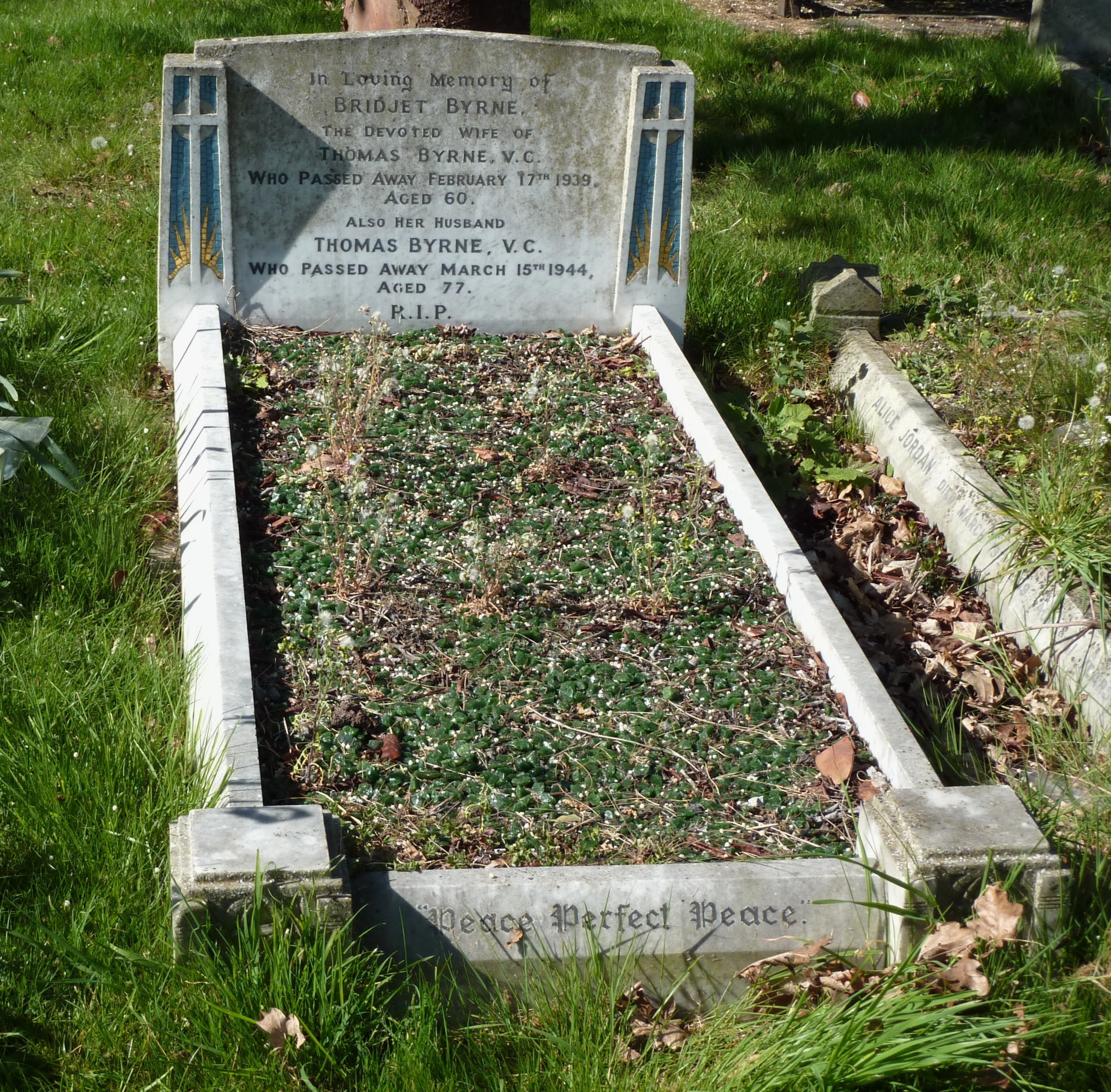
Byrne's grave (Section MJ Grave 22) at Canterbury City Cemetery, England, in 2017

He later served in the Second Boer War and retired from the army in 1909 after serving with the Regimental Police. In retirement he lived in Canterbury, Kent. He rejoined the army in 1914 and served at the Cavalry Remount Depot, Canterbury, and in the Garrison Police. After the War, he was a messenger at the Cavalry Pay and Records Office. He died in Canterbury on 15 March 1944, and is buried at Canterbury City Cemetery. His funeral was attended by Winston Churchill, who also took part in the charge at Omdurman.

== Bibliography ==
- The Register of the Victoria Cross (1981, 1988 and 1997)
- Clarke, Brian D. H. (1986). "A register of awards to Irish-born officers and men". The Irish Sword. XVI (64): 185–287.
- Ireland's VCs (Dept of Economic Development, 1995)
- Monuments to Courage (David Harvey, 1999)
- Irish Winners of the Victoria Cross (Richard Doherty & David Truesdale, 2000)
- Ingleton, Roy (2011). Kent VCs. Pen and Sword Books. ISBN 978-1848844094.
