= Robert Humpston (VC) =

Recipient of the Victoria Cross

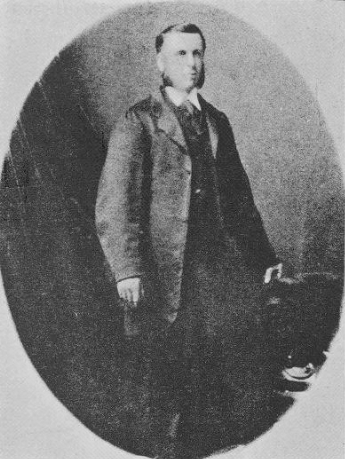
- Born: 1832; Derby, Derbyshire, England
- Died: 22 December 1884 (aged 52); Nottingham, Nottinghamshire, England
- Burial place: Nottingham General Cemetery
- Military career
- Allegiance: United Kingdom
- Branch: British Army
- Units: Rifle Brigade
- Conflicts: Crimean War; Indian Mutiny
- Awards: Victoria Cross

Robert Humpston VC (1832 – 22 December 1884) was an English recipient of the Victoria Cross, the highest and most prestigious award for gallantry in the face of the enemy that can be awarded to British and Commonwealth forces.

Humpston was about 23 years old, and a private in the 2nd Battalion, The Rifle Brigade (Prince Consort's Own), British Army during the Crimean War when the following deed took place for which he was awarded the VC.

On 22 April 1855 in the Crimea Private Humpston and Private Joseph Bradshaw, on their own, attacked and captured a Russian rifle pit situated among the rocks overhanging the Woronzoff Road. The pit was occupied every night by the Russians and its capture and subsequent destruction was of great importance.

His Victoria Cross is part of the collection of Derby Museum & Art Gallery at Derby in England.

Following his death in 1884 Robert Humpston was buried in a pauper's grave. In September 2007, following a two-year campaign to raise £1,200 to get a headstone for Pte Humpston, his grave was dedicated in a ceremony at Nottingham Cemetery.
