= Christopher Bushell =

British Army officer (1888–1918)

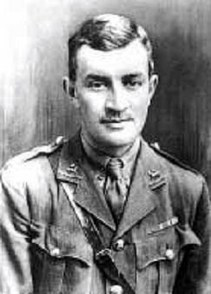
- Born: 31 October 1888; Neston, Cheshire, England
- Died: 8 August 1918 (aged 29); Morlancourt, France
- Burial place: Querrieu British Cemetery
- Military career
- Allegiance: United Kingdom
- Branch: British Army
- Service years: 1912–1918
- Rank: Lieutenant Colonel
- Units: Queen's Royal West Surrey Regiment
- Commands: 7th (Service) Battalion, Queen's Royal West Surrey Regiment
- Conflicts: World War I †
- Awards: Victoria Cross; Distinguished Service Order

Lieutenant Colonel Christopher Bushell VC DSO (31 October 1888 – 8 August 1918) was a British Army officer and an English recipient of the Victoria Cross (VC), the highest and most prestigious award for gallantry in the face of the enemy that can be awarded to British and Commonwealth forces.

Bushell was 29 years old, and a temporary lieutenant colonel in the 7th (S) Battalion, The Queen's Royal West Surrey Regiment, British Army, during the First World War when the following deed took place for which he was awarded the Victoria Cross.

On 23 March 1918 west of St. Quentin's Canal and north of Tergnier, France, Lieutenant Colonel Bushell personally led C Company of his battalion, who were cooperating with an Allied regiment in a counterattack. In the course of this attack he was severely wounded in the head, but continued to carry on, walking in front of both British and Allied troops, encouraging them and visiting every portion of the lines in the face of terrific machine-gun and rifle fire. He refused to go to the rear until he had to be removed to the dressing station in a fainting condition.

He was killed in action to the south of Morlancourt, Somme, France, on 8 August 1918. He is buried at Querrieu CWGC, Somme, France.

In 1923, the Christopher Bushell Prize of books, for Modern History undergraduates, was established at Corpus Christi College, Oxford, where Bushell read Modern History from 1906 to 1909.

== Bibliography ==
- Monuments to Courage (David Harvey, 1999)
- The Register of the Victoria Cross (This England, 1997)
- Gliddon, Gerald (2013) [2004]. Spring Offensive 1918. VCs of the First World War. Stroud, Gloucestershire: The History Press. ISBN 978-0-7524-8730-4.
