= Bernard Matthew Cassidy =

Recipient of the Victoria Cross

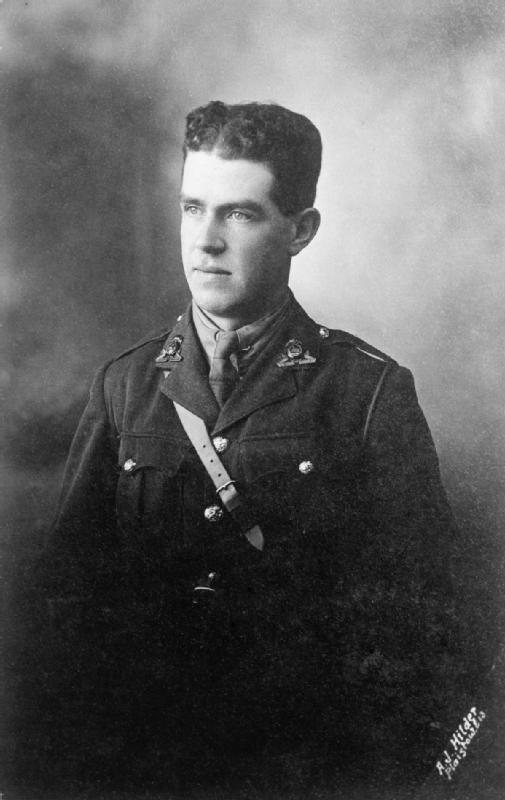
- Born: 17 August 1892; London, England
- Died: 28 March 1918 (aged 25); Arras, France
- Military career
- Allegiance: United Kingdom
- Branch: British Army
- Rank: Second Lieutenant
- Units: The Lancashire Fusiliers
- Conflicts: World War I †
- Awards: Victoria Cross

Bernard Matthew Cassidy VC (17 August 1892 – 28 March 1918) was an English recipient of the Victoria Cross, the highest and most prestigious award for gallantry in the face of the enemy that can be awarded to British and Commonwealth forces.

== Details ==
Cassidy was 25 years old, and a second lieutenant in the 2nd Battalion, The Lancashire Fusiliers, British Army during the First World War at the German spring offensive when the following deed took place for which he was awarded the VC.

On 28 March 1918 at Arras, France, at a time when the flank of the division was in danger, Second Lieutenant Cassidy was in command of the left company of his battalion. He had been given orders to hold on to the position at all costs and he carried out this instruction to the letter. Although the enemy came in overwhelming numbers he continued to rally and encourage his men, under terrific bombardment until the company was eventually surrounded and he was killed.

Cassidy has no known grave, but is remembered on the Arras Memorial. He has a street named after him in Canning Town in London called Bernard Cassidy Street. His VC is on display in the Lord Ashcroft Gallery at the Imperial War Museum, London.

== Bibliography ==
- Monuments to Courage (David Harvey, 1999)
- The Register of the Victoria Cross (This England, 1997)
- Gliddon, Gerald (2013) [2004]. Spring Offensive 1918. VCs of the First World War. Stroud, Gloucestershire: The History Press. ISBN 978-0-7524-8730-4.
