= Military History Society of Ireland =

Irish historical society

- Formation: 1949; 77 years ago
- Type: NPO
- Headquarters: Newman House, 86 St. Stephen's Green, Dublin 2
- Location: Dublin, Ireland
- Region served: Ireland
- Members: 700
- Official language: English
- President: Harman Murtagh
- Affiliations: International Commission of Military History
- Staff: 25
- Volunteers: 25
- Website: www.mhsi.ie

The Military History Society of Ireland promotes the study of military history, and in particular the history of warfare in Ireland and of Irish people in war.

The society was formed in 1949, co-founded by Gerard Anthony Hayes-McCoy, and has published its official journal; The Irish Sword, continuously since then. The society organises frequent lectures, conferences, field trips and tours. In 2009 the society had 700 members. As of 2011, the president of the society was Harman Murtagh and Donal O'Carroll was a former president.
