= William McWheeney =

Irish recipient of the Victoria Cross

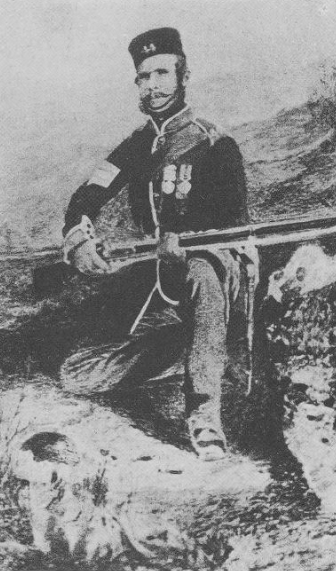
- Born: 1830; Bangor, County Down, United Kingdom of Great Britain and Ireland (present-day Bangor, Northern Ireland)
- Died: 17 May 1866 (aged 35–36); Dover, Kent, England
- Burial place: St James Cemetery, Dover
- Military career
- Allegiance: United Kingdom
- Branch: British Army
- Rank: Colour Sergeant
- Units: 44th (East Essex) Regiment of Foot
- Conflicts: Crimean War; Second Anglo-Chinese War
- Awards: Victoria Cross; Distinguished Conduct Medal

William McWheeney VC DCM (1830 – 17 May 1866), also known as Mawhinney, was born in Bangor, County Down. He was an Irish recipient of the Victoria Cross, the highest and most prestigious award for gallantry in the face of the enemy that can be awarded to British and Commonwealth forces. He was awarded the VC for his service during the Siege of Sevastopol (1854–1855).

== Details ==
McWheeney was 23 or 24 years old, and a sergeant in the 44th Regiment of Foot (later The Essex Regiment), British Army during the Crimean War when the following deeds took place for which he was awarded the VC:

Volunteered as sharpshooter at the commencement of the siege, and was in [sic] charge of the party of the 44th Regiment; was always vigilant and active, and signalised himself on the 20th October, 1854, when one of his party, Private JohnKeane, [sic] 44th Regiment, was dangerously wounded in the Woronzoff Road, at the time the sharpshooters were repulsed from the Quarries by overwhelming numbers. Serjennt M'Wheeney, on his return, took the wounded man on hisback, and brought him to a place of safety. This wasundera [sic] very heavyfire. He was also the means of saving the life of Corporal Courtney. This man was one of the sharpshooters, and was severely wounded in the head, 5th December, 1854. Serjeant M'Wheeney brought him from under fire, and dug up a slight cover with his bayonet, where the two remained until dark, 'when they retired. Serjeant M'Wheeney volunteered for the advanced guard of General Eyre's Brigade, in the Cemetery, on the 18th June, 1855, and was never absent from duty during the war.

McWheeney was personally presented with the Victoria Cross by Queen Victoria at the first VC investiture held at Hyde Park, London, on 26 June 1857.

== Further information ==
McWheeney died at Dover on 17 May 1866, and was interred there at St James Cemetery, Section R, Number 1-11; his Victoria Cross is displayed at The Essex Regiment Museum (Chelmsford).

== Publications ==
- Victoria Cross Heroes (Michael Ashcroft, 2006), Headline Book Publishing; ISBN 0-7553-1632-0/ISBN 9780755316335
- Monuments to Courage (David Harvey, 1999), Naval Military Press, United States (2008); ISBN 1847348092/ISBN 9781847348098
- Irish Winners of the Victoria Cross (Richard Doherty & David Truesdale) Four Courts Press Ltd (1 January 2000); ISBN 1851824421/ISBN 978-1851824427
