= Hugh Colvin =

Recipient of the Victoria Cross (1887–1962)

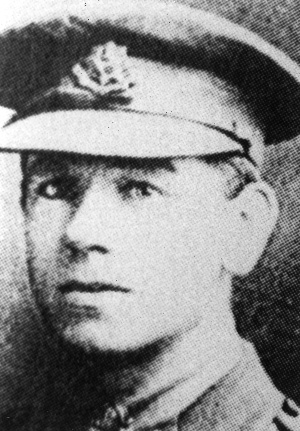
- Born: 1 February 1887; Burnley, Lancashire
- Died: 16 September 1962 (aged 75); Newtownabbey, County Antrim
- Burial place: Carnmoney Cemetery, Newtownabbey
- Military career
- Allegiance: United Kingdom
- Branch: British Army
- Rank: Major
- Units: 8th Hussars; Cheshire Regiment
- Conflicts: World War I – Battle of Passchendaele
- Awards: Victoria Cross

Hugh Colvin VC (1 February 1887 – 16 September 1962) was an English recipient of the Victoria Cross, the highest and most prestigious award for gallantry in the face of the enemy that can be awarded to British and Commonwealth forces.

He was 30 years old, and a second Lieutenant in the 9th Battalion, The Cheshire Regiment, British Army during the First World War when the following deed took place for which he was awarded the VC.

On 20 September 1917 east of Ypres, Belgium, when all the other officers of his company and all but one in the leading company had become casualties, Second Lieutenant Colvin took command of both companies and led them forward under heavy fire with great success. He went with only two men to a dug-out, when he left the men on top, entered it alone and brought out 14 prisoners. He then proceeded to clear other dug-outs, alone or with only one man, capturing machine-guns, killing some of the enemy and taking a large number of prisoners.

After he retired from the Cheshire Regiment, he was appointed in 1938 as a recruitment officer in Dewsbury with the rank of major.

His Victoria Cross is displayed at The Cheshire Regiment Museum, Chester, England.

== Bibliography ==
- Irish Winners of the Victoria Cross (Richard Doherty & David Truesdale, 2000)
- Monuments to Courage (David Harvey, 1999)
- The Register of the Victoria Cross (This England, 1997)
- Snelling, Stephen (2012) [1998]. Passchendaele 1917. VCs of the First World War. The History Press. ISBN 978-0752476667.
