= John MacLaren Erskine =

Recipient of the Victoria Cross

- Born: 13 January 1894; Dunfermline, Fife, Scotland
- Died: 14 April 1917 (aged 23); Arras, France
- Military career
- Allegiance: United Kingdom
- Branch: British Army
- Service years: 1914–1917
- Rank: Serjeant
- Units: Cameronians (Scottish Rifles)
- Conflicts: World War I †
- Awards: Victoria Cross

Serjeant John MacLaren Erskine VC (13 January 1894 – 14 April 1917) was a British Army soldier and a Scottish recipient of the Victoria Cross (VC), the highest and most prestigious award for gallantry in the face of the enemy that can be awarded to British and Commonwealth forces.

Erskine was born in January 1894 to William and Elizabeth Erskine. He was 22 years old, and a serjeant in the 5th Battalion, The Cameronians (Scottish Rifles), British Army during the First World War, when he was awarded the VC for his actions on 22 June 1916 at Givenchy, France.

== Citation ==
For most conspicuous bravery. Whilst the near lip of a crater, caused by the explosion of a large enemy mine, was being consolidated, Actg. Serjt. Erskine rushed out under continuous fire with utter disregard of danger and rescued a wounded serjeant and a private. Later, seeing his officer, who was believed to be dead, show signs of movement, he ran out to him, bandaged his head, and remained with him for fully an hour, though repeatedly fired at, whilst a shallow trench was being dug to them. He then assisted in bringing in his officer, shielding him with his own body in order to lessen the chance of his being hit again.

— London Gazette, 4 August 1916

He was killed in action at Arras, France, on 14 April 1917 and, as his body was never found, his name is commemorated in Bay 6 of the Arras Memorial.

== The Medal ==
His Victoria Cross is displayed at the Cameronians Regimental Museum, in Hamilton Low Parks Museum, Hamilton, Lanarkshire, Scotland.

== Bibliography ==
- Monuments to Courage (David Harvey, 1999)
- The Register of the Victoria Cross (This England, 1997)
- Scotland's Forgotten Valour (Graham Ross, 1995)
- Gliddon, Gerald (2004) [2012]. VCs of the First World War: Cambrai 1917. The History Press. ISBN 978-0-75-247668-1.
