= Timothy O'Hea =

Irish soldier recipient of the Victoria Cross (1843 – 1874)

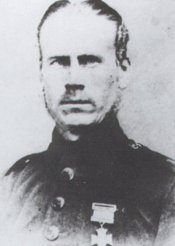
- Timothy O'Hea VC
- Born: 11 Jun 1843; Schull, County Cork
- Died: 1874 aged 31; Sturt Stony Desert, in the far south western border area of Queensland Australia
- Burial place: body never recovered
- Military career
- Allegiance: United Kingdom
- Branch: British Army
- Rank: Private
- Units: 1st Battalion, Rifle Brigade (Prince Consort's Own)
- Awards: Victoria Cross

Timothy O'Hea VC (1843 – 1874), born in Schull, County Cork, was an Irish recipient of the Victoria Cross, the highest and most prestigious award for valour that can be awarded to British and Commonwealth forces. His is the only award issued for an act in Canada.

== Victoria Cross ==
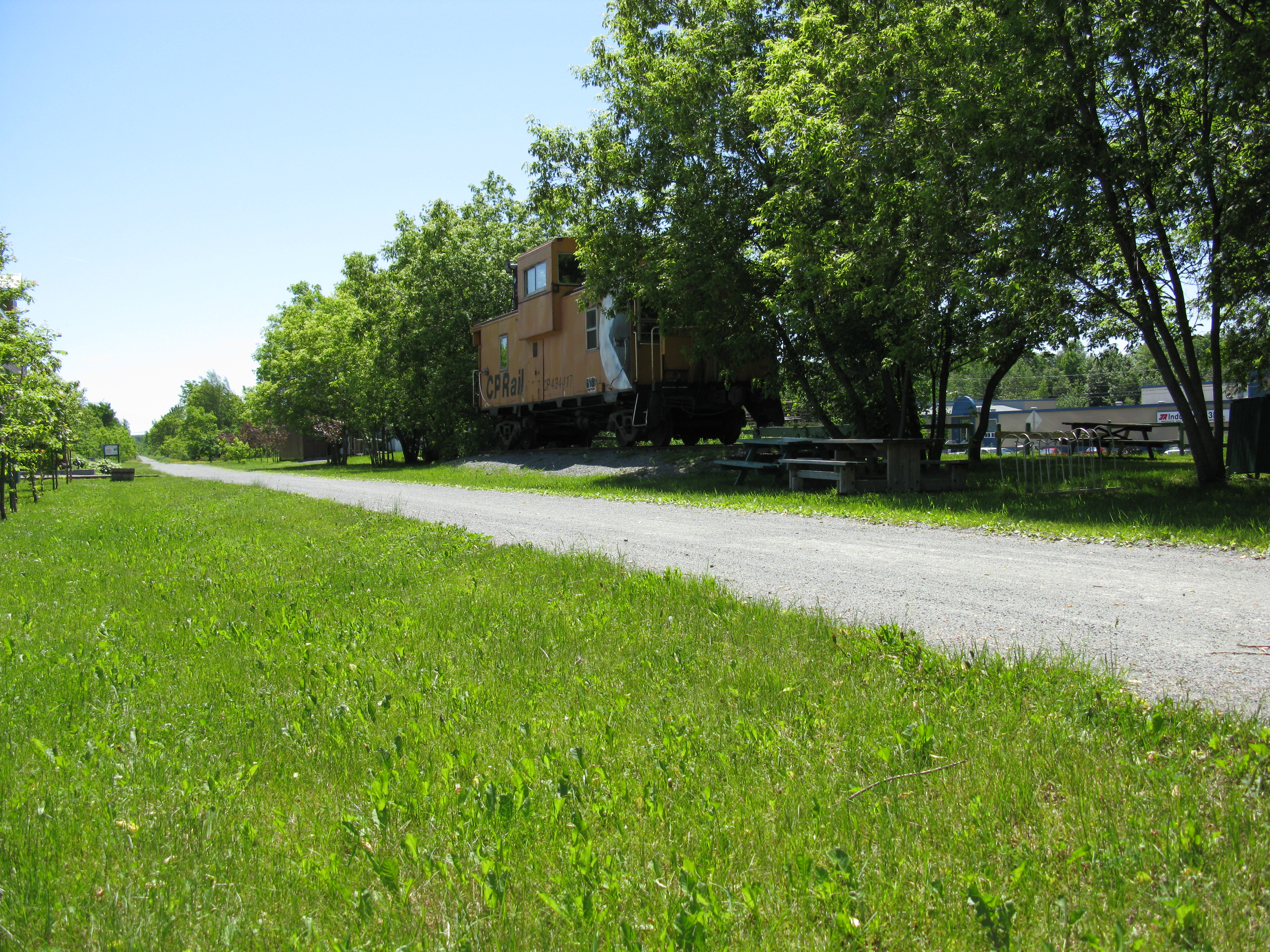
Location of the VC action

O'Hea was born on 11 June 1843, at Schull Co Cork, Ireland. He was a private in the 1st Battalion, Rifle Brigade (Prince Consort's Own), British Army stationed in the Province of Canada when the following deed took place for which he was awarded the Victoria Cross. The spring of 1866 was a period of heightened military preparations to face the Fenian Raids.

On 9 June 1866 at Danville, Canada East, a fire broke out in a railway car containing 2,000 pounds (910 kg) of ammunition, between Quebec City and Montreal. The alarm was given and the car was disconnected at Danville Railway Station. While the sergeant in charge was considering what should be done, Private O'Hea took the keys from his hand, rushed to the car, opened it and called for water and a ladder. It was due to this man's example that the fire was suppressed.

== Australia ==
O'Hea is believed to have died in the Sturt Stony Desert in the far south western border area of Queensland in November 1874 while searching for a lost member of the Leichhardt expedition. A book by Elizabeth Reid, (born 1928 and since deceased), The Singular Journey of O'Hea's Cross, published in 2005, suggested Timothy O'Hea died in Ireland, after his discharge from the British Army in 1868. His identity and VC annuity were then assumed by his brother John, and it is this man who actually died in Australia.

== Medal ==
His Victoria Cross is displayed at the Royal Green Jackets (Rifles) Museum, Winchester, England.
