= HMS Caledon =

Two ships of the Royal Navy have borne the name HMS Caledon:

- HMS Caledon (1808) was a 16-gun sloop, previously the French ship Henri. She was captured from the French in 1808 and sold in 1811.
- HMS Caledon (D53) was a C-class light cruiser launched in 1916. She was converted into an anti-aircraft ship in 1943 and was sold for scrapping in 1948.

== See also ==
- Ships named HMS Caledonia
