= Cornelius Coughlan =

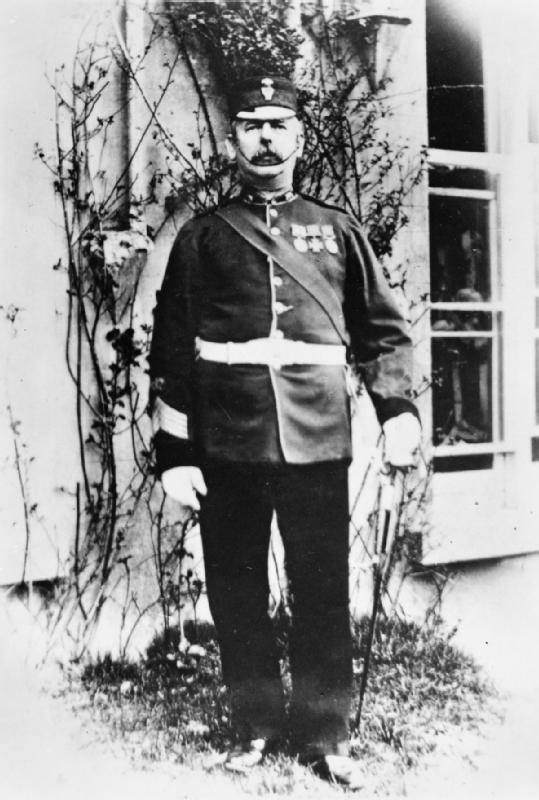
- Born: 27 June 1828; Eyrecourt, County Galway, Ireland
- Died: 14 February 1915 (aged 86); Westport, County Mayo, Ireland
- Burial place: Westport Old Cemetery
- Military career
- Allegiance: United Kingdom
- Branch: British Army
- Rank: Sergeant Major
- Units: 75th Regiment of Foot; Connaught Rangers
- Conflicts: Indian Mutiny
- Awards: Victoria Cross

Cornelius Coughlan VC (27 June 1828 – 14 February 1915) was an Irish recipient of the Victoria Cross, the highest and most prestigious award for gallantry in the face of the enemy that can be awarded to British and Commonwealth forces.

== Details ==
Coughlan was 28 years old, and a Colour Sergeant in the 75th Regiment of Foot (later The Gordon Highlanders), British Army during the Indian Mutiny when the following action took place on 8 June and 18 July 1857 at Delhi, British India for which he was awarded the VC:

For gallantly venturing, under a heavy fire, with three others, into a Serai occupied by the Enemy in great numbers, and removing Private Corbett, 75th Regiment, who lay severely wounded. Also for cheering and encouraging a party which hesitated to charge down a lane in Subzee Mundee, at Delhi, lined on each side with huts, and raked by a cross fire; then entering with the said party into an enclosure filled with the Enemy, and destroying every man. For having also, on the same occasion, returned under a cross fire to collect dhoolies, and carry off the wounded; a service which was successfully performed, and for which this man obtained great praise from the Officers of his Regiment.

Queen Victoria wrote a personal letter to Coughlan after hearing about his acts of bravery.

== Later life ==
Coughlan returned from India to serve for two decades in the Connaught Rangers in Ireland achieving the rank of sergeant-major.

He died in Westport, County Mayo on 14 February 1915 and is buried locally in Aughavale Cemetery near Murrisk. His grave was unmarked until 2004, when a headstone was erected.

== The medal ==
His Victoria Cross is displayed at the National War Museum of Scotland (Edinburgh Castle, Edinburgh, Scotland).
