= John Connors (VC) =

Irish recipient of the Victoria Cross

John Connors VC
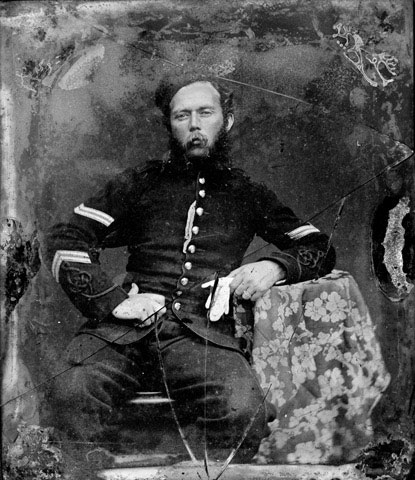
- Born: October 1830; Listowel, County Kerry
- Died: 29 January 1857 (aged 26); Corfu, Greece
- Burial place: British Cemetery, Corfu
- Military career
- Allegiance: United Kingdom
- Branch: British Army
- Rank: Corporal
- Units: 3rd Regiment of Foot
- Conflicts: Crimean War
- Awards: Victoria Cross

John Connors VC (October 1830 – 29 January 1857) was born in Duagh, Listowel, County Kerry, Ireland and was an Irish recipient of the Victoria Cross, the highest and most prestigious award for gallantry in the face of the enemy that can be awarded to British and Commonwealth forces.

== Details ==
Connors was approximately 24 years old, and a private in the 3rd Regiment of Foot (later The East Kent Regiment (The Buffs)), British Army during the Crimean War when the following deed took place for which he was awarded the VC.

On 8 September 1855 at Sebastopol in the Crimea, Private Connors showed conspicuous gallantry at the assault on the Redan in personal conflict with the enemy. He rescued an officer of the 30th Regiment who was surrounded by Russians, by shooting one and bayoneting another.

== Further information ==
He later achieved the rank of Corporal. He died at Corfu 29 January 1857.

There is some doubt as to whether Connors was ever awarded the medal before his death, or whether it reached his widow.
