= John Alexander (VC) =

Recipient of the Victoria Cross (d. 1857)

John Alexander VC
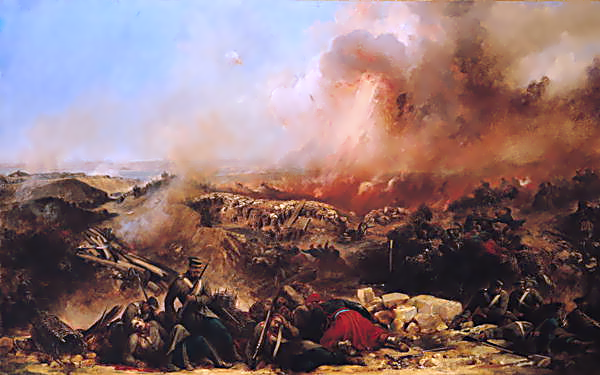
- Depiction of the Siege of Sebastopol
- Born: Mullingar, County Westmeath, Ireland
- Died: 24 September 1857; Alumbagh, Lucknow, British India
- Military career
- Allegiance: (United Kingdom of Great Britain and Ireland) United Kingdom
- Branch: British Army
- Rank: Private
- Units: 90th Perthshire Light Infantry
- Conflicts: Crimean War; Indian Mutiny
- Awards: Victoria Cross; Médaille Militaire (France)

John Alexander VC (died 24 September 1857) was a British Army soldier and an Irish recipient of the Victoria Cross (VC), the highest award for gallantry in the face of the enemy that can be awarded to a member of the British and Commonwealth forces.

Born in Mullingar, County Westmeath, Alexander was a private in the 90th Perthshire Light Infantry (later known as The Cameronians (Scottish Rifles)), during the Crimean War when the following deed took place for which he was awarded the VC:

On 18 June 1855 after the attack on the Redan at Sebastopol, Alexander went out from the trenches under very heavy fire and brought in several wounded men. On 6 September, when he was with a working party in the most advanced trench, he went out under heavy fire and helped to bring in a captain who was severely wounded.

He was later killed in action during the Siege of Lucknow during the Indian Mutiny in British India on 24 September 1857.

== The medal ==
Private Alexander's Victoria Cross is displayed at the National War Museum of Scotland at Edinburgh Castle in Scotland.
