= John Crimmin =

Recipient of the Victoria Cross (1859–1945)

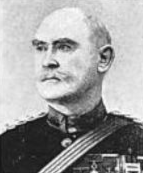
- Born: 19 March 1859; Kilballyowen, Bruff, County Limerick, Ireland
- Died: 20 February 1945 (aged 85); Wells, Somerset, England
- Burial place: Wells Cemetery, Somerset
- Military career
- Allegiance: United Kingdom
- Branch: Indian Army
- Rank: Colonel
- Units: Bombay Medical Service, Indian Army
- Conflicts: Karen-Ni Expedition, Burma
- Awards: Victoria Cross

Colonel John Crimmin VC CB CIE VD (19 March 1859 – 20 February 1945) was an Irish recipient of the Victoria Cross, the highest and most prestigious award for gallantry in the face of the enemy that can be awarded to British and Commonwealth forces. He also served as the Hon. Physician to H.M. The King.

== Biography ==
John Crimmin was born on 19 March 1859. He was 29 years old, and a surgeon in the Bombay Medical Service, Indian Army during the Karen-Ni Expedition, Burma when the following deed took place for which he was awarded the VC.

On 1 January 1889, in the action near Lwekaw, Eastern Karenni, Burma (now Myanmar), a lieutenant and four men charged into a large body of the enemy and two men were wounded. Surgeon John Crimmin attended one of them under enemy fire and he then joined the firing line and helped in driving the enemy from small clumps of trees where they had taken shelter. Later while Surgeon Crimmin was attending a wounded man several of the enemy rushed out at him. He thrust his sword through one of them, attacked a second and a third dropped from the fire of a sepoy. The remainder fled.

He continued to serve in the Bombay Medical Service, where he was listed as Health officer at the Port of Bombay in 1902. He was appointed a Companion of the Order of the Indian Empire (CIE) in the 1901 New Year Honours. He was promoted to lieutenant colonel on 30 September 1902, and achieved the rank of colonel on 1 October 1913.

He died at Woodbury House, Wells, Somerset, 20 February 1945.
