= John Cunningham (VC 1917) =

British soldier during the First World War and Irish recipient of the Victoria Cross

- Born: 22 October 1890; Thurles, County Tipperary, Ireland
- Died: 16 April 1917 (aged 26); Barlin, France
- Burial place: Barlin, France
- Military career
- Allegiance: United Kingdom
- Branch: British Army
- Rank: Corporal
- Service number: 8916
- Unit: Prince of Wales's Leinster Regiment
- Conflicts: First World War
- Awards: Victoria Cross

Corporal John Cunningham VC, (22 October 1890 – 16 April 1917) was a British soldier during the First World War, an Irish recipient of the Victoria Cross, the highest and most prestigious award for gallantry in the face of the enemy that can be awarded to British and Commonwealth forces.

== Details ==
Cunningham, born in Thurles, County Tipperary on 22 October 1890, was one of two sons of Johanna and Joseph Cunningham. He enlisted in 1908, and appears on the 1911 census at Devonport.

He was 26 years old, and a corporal in the 2nd Battalion, Prince of Wales's Leinster Regiment, when he performed a deed on 12 April 1917 at Bois-en-Hache, near Barlin, France, which earned him the Victoria Cross. Cunningham later died as a result of his injuries.

For most conspicuous bravery and devotion to duty when in command of a Lewis Gun section on the most exposed flank of the attack. His section came under heavy enfilade fire and suffered severely. Although wounded he succeeded almost alone in reaching his objective with his gun, which he got into action in spite of much opposition. When counter-attacked by a party of twenty of the enemy he exhausted his ammunition against them, then, standing in full view, he commenced throwing bombs. He was wounded again, and fell, but picked himself up and continued to fight single-handed with the enemy until his bombs were exhausted. He then made his way back to our lines with a fractured arm and other wounds. There is little doubt that the superb courage of this N.C.O. cleared up a most critical situation on the left flank of the attack. Corporal Cunningham died in hospital from the effects of his wounds.

— The London Gazette, 8 June 1917

He is buried in Barlin cemetery, Pas de Calais, plot 1, row A, grave 39.

== The Medal ==
His medals are on loan to the Imperial War Museum in London.
