= Eric Norman Frankland Bell =

Recipient of the Victoria Cross

Eric Norman Frankland Bell VC
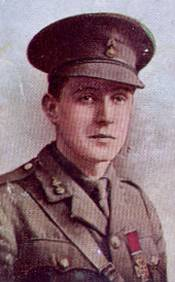
- Born: 28 August 1895; Enniskillen, County Fermanagh, Ireland
- Died: 1 July 1916 (aged 20); Thiepval, France
- Military career
- Allegiance: United Kingdom
- Branch: British Army
- Service years: 1914–1916
- Rank: Captain
- Units: 9th Battalion, The Royal Inniskilling Fusiliers
- Conflicts: World War I: Western Front; Battle of the Somme; Battle of Albert; First day on the Somme †
- Awards: Victoria Cross

Eric Norman Frankland Bell VC (28 August 1895 – 1 July 1916) was an Irish recipient of the Victoria Cross, the highest and most prestigious award for gallantry in the face of the enemy that can be awarded to British and Commonwealth forces. A soldier with The Royal Inniskilling Fusiliers during the First World War, he was posthumously awarded the VC for his actions on 1 July 1916, during the Battle of the Somme.

== Early life ==
Eric Norman Frankland Bell was born on 28 August 1895 in Enniskillen, County Fermanagh, Ireland, to Edward Bell and his wife Dora née Crowder, one of four children. His father was an officer in the British Army's Royal Inniskilling Fusiliers, serving in Burma at the time of Eric's birth. The battalion was later posted to Cheshire and the family moved to live in Warrington, where Bell attended school. They later moved to Liverpool and Bell completed his schooling and then went on to Liverpool University to study architecture under Sir Charles Reilly.

== First World War ==
In August 1914, on the outbreak of the First World War, Bell volunteered for the Royal Inniskilling Fusiliers, the regiment of the British Army in which his father was serving as adjutant of the 9th Battalion. He was commissioned a second lieutenant in September 1914 and was posted to the regiment's 6th Battalion. After a transfer to the 8th Battalion, he was assigned to the 9th Battalion. His two brothers, who had emigrated to the United States and Australia respectively, had also volunteered for the regiment.

The 9th Battalion was part of 109th Brigade, 36th (Ulster) Division, which was sent to the Western Front in France in October 1915. The following July, the division took part in the Battle of the Somme. By then, Bell had been promoted to temporary captain and was attached to the battalion's light trench mortar battery. On 1 July 1916, the opening day of the battle, he was advancing with the infantry near the village of Thiepval towards the Thiepval Road and onto the objective, a redoubt held by German forces. When the advance in his sector was held up by a German machinegun, he made a solo foray to deal with the gunner. Further holdups were dealt with on his own through the use of trench mortar bombs. He was rallying leaderless troops when he was killed. His actions was posthumously recognised with an award of the Victoria Cross (VC). The VC, instituted in 1856, was the highest award for valour that could be bestowed on a soldier of the British Empire. The citation for his VC read as follows:

For most conspicuous bravery. He was in command of a Trench Mortar Battery, and advanced with the Infantry in the attack. When our front line was hung up by enfilading machine gun fire Captain Bell crept forward and shot the machine gunner. Later, on no less than three occasions, when our bombing parties, which were clearing the enemy's trenches, were unable to advance, he went forward alone and threw Trench Mortar bombs among the enemy. When he had no more bombs available he stood on the parapet, under intense fire, and used a rifle with great coolness and effect on the enemy advancing to counter-attack. Finally he was killed rallying and reorganising infantry parties which had lost their officers. All this was outside the scope of his normal duties with his battery. He gave his life in his supreme devotion to duty.

Bell's body was never recovered so he had no known grave. Instead, his name is listed on the Thiepval Memorial to the Missing, which was established near Thiepval in Picardy. His brothers survived the war, although both had been wounded, and his parents died soon after the end of the war.

There are several memorials to Bell's memory; he is listed on the Royal Inniskilling Fusiliers memorial in Belfast, the King's Garden Memorial in Bootle, and the War Memorial in Enniskillen. There is also a plaque on the former family home in Liverpool as well as a blue plaque on the house he was born in, 1 Alma Terrace, in Enniskillen.

== Victoria Cross ==
King George V presented Bell's VC to his father on 29 November 1916, in a ceremony at Buckingham Palace. The VC was later in the possession of his sister, who had emigrated in New Zealand in 1933. The sister also had possession of his 1914–15 Star but the whereabouts of his British War Medal and Victory Medal are not known. In 1999, a relative, Air Marshal Sir Richard Bolt, formerly New Zealand's Chief of Defence Staff, offered the VC to the museum of the Royal Inniskilling Fusiliers. It was presented to the museum in February 2001, where it is now displayed.
