= William Coffey (VC) =

Irish recipient of the Victoria Cross (1829–1875)

William Coffey VC DCM
- Born: 5 August 1829; Knocklong, County Limerick
- Died: 13 July 1875 (aged 45); Chesterfield, Derbyshire
- Burial place: Spital cemetery, Chesterfield
- Military career
- Allegiance: United Kingdom
- Branch: British Army
- Rank: Sergeant
- Units: 34th Regiment of Foot
- Conflicts: Crimean War; Indian Mutiny
- Awards: Victoria Cross; Distinguished Conduct Medal; Médaille militaire

William Coffey VC DCM (5 August 1829 – 13 July 1875), born in Knocklong, County Limerick, was an Irish recipient of the Victoria Cross, the highest and most prestigious award for gallantry in the face of the enemy that can be awarded to British and Commonwealth forces.

== Details ==
He was 25 years old, and a private in the 34th Regiment (later The Border Regiment), British Army during the Crimean War when the following deed took place for which he was awarded the VC.

On 29 March 1855 at Sebastopol, the Crimea, Private Coffey threw a live shell, which had fallen into a trench, over the parapet and thus saved many lives.

== Further information ==
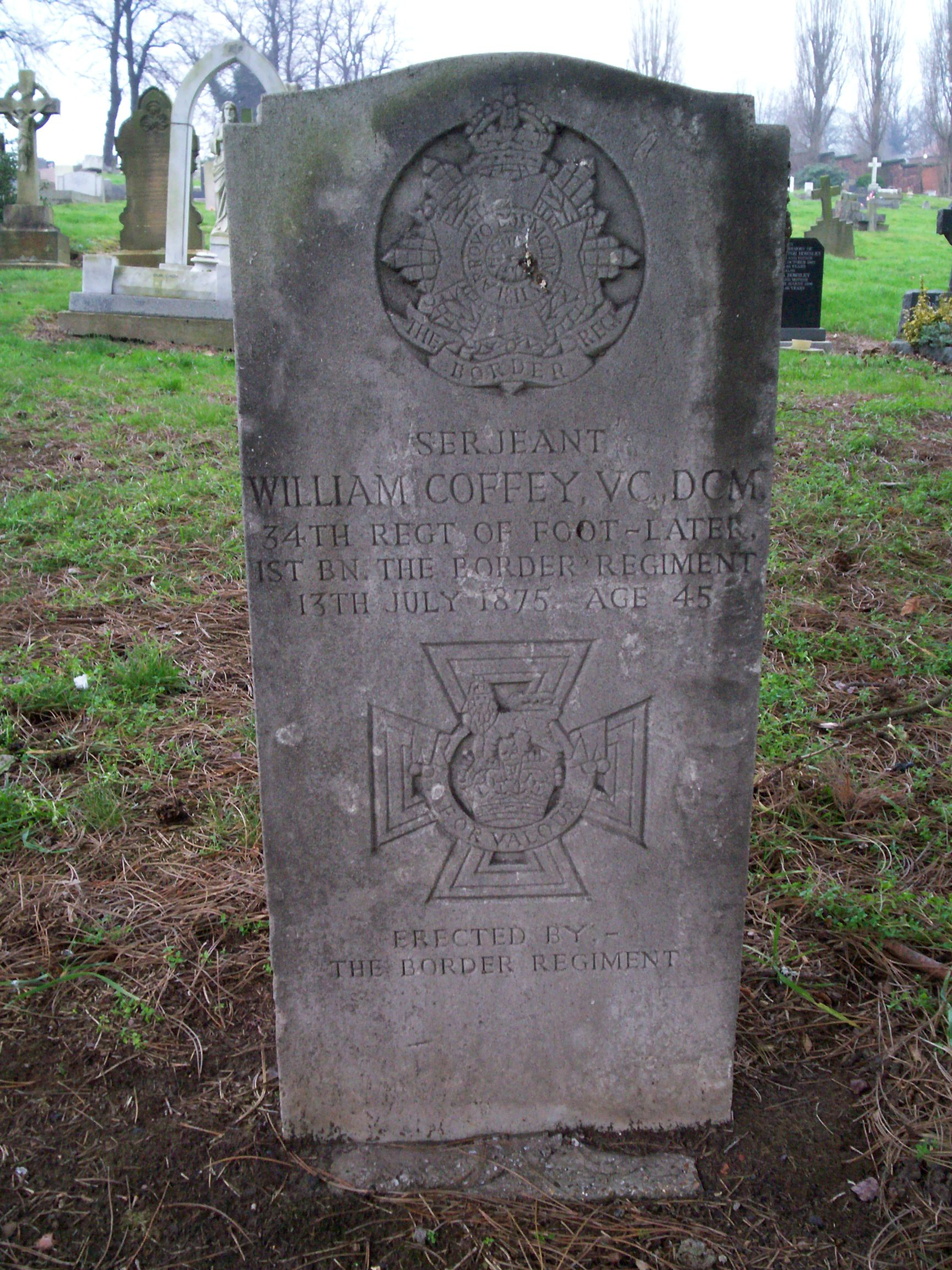
Coffey's gravestone

Coffey was posted to India fighting in the Indian Mutiny. He achieved the rank of sergeant. It was reported that he died by suicide (shot himself) in the Army drill shed Sheffield, 13 July 1875. However his death certificate shows he died of dysentery at Stonegravels, Chesterfield. He was buried in Spital cemetery, Chesterfield. Originally he was buried in an unmarked, common plot but in 1970 a stone, provided by the Border Regiment, was put on his grave following a service.

== The medal ==
His Victoria Cross is displayed at Cumbria's Museum of Military Life Carlisle Castle, Cumbria, England.
