= Joseph Bradshaw (VC) =

Irish recipient of the Victoria Cross (1835–1893)

Joseph Bradshaw VC
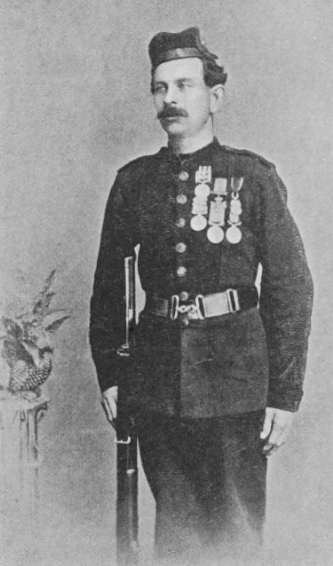
- Born: 1835; Dromkeen, County Limerick, Ireland
- Died: 29 August 1893 (aged 57–58); St Johns, County Limerick, Ireland
- Military career
- Allegiance: United Kingdom
- Branch: British Army
- Rank: Corporal
- Units: 2nd Battalion, The Rifle Brigade (Prince Consort's Own)
- Conflicts: Crimean War; Indian Mutiny
- Awards: Victoria Cross; Médaille Militaire

Joseph Bradshaw (1835 – 29 August 1893), born in Pettigreen, Dromkeen, County Limerick, was an Irish recipient of the Victoria Cross, the highest and most prestigious award for gallantry in the face of the enemy that can be awarded to British and Commonwealth forces.

== Details ==
Bradshaw was approximately 20 years old, and a private in the 2nd Battalion, The Rifle Brigade (Prince Consort's Own), British Army during the Crimean War when the following deed took place for which he was awarded the VC.

On 22 April 1855 in the Crimea, Private Bradshaw and another private (Robert Humpston), on their own attacked and captured a Russian rifle pit situated among the rocks overhanging the Woronzoff Road. The pit was occupied every night by the Russians and its capture and subsequent destruction was of great importance.

== Further information ==
He later achieved the rank of corporal. He died at St Johns, Limerick, County Limerick 29 August 1893.

His Victoria Cross is displayed at the Royal Green Jackets (Rifles) Museum, Winchester, Hampshire, England.
