= Richard Fitzgerald (VC) =

Irish recipient of the Victoria Cross

- Born: December 1831; Cork, County Cork, Ireland
- Died: 1884 (aged 53); India
- Military career
- Allegiance: United Kingdom
- Branch: Bengal Army
- Rank: Gunner
- Units: Bengal Horse Artillery
- Conflicts: Indian Mutiny
- Awards: Victoria Cross

Richard Fitzgerald VC (December 1831, St. Finbar's, Cork, Ireland – 1884 in India) was an Irish recipient of the Victoria Cross.

In Cork on 17 December 1851 he enlisted in the Bengal Horse Artillery, Bengal Army, for 12 years service, giving his trade as carpenter. He arrived in India to join his unit in November 1852.

== Details ==
He was a 25 year old Gunner in the 2nd Troop, 3rd Brigade, Bengal Horse Artillery during the Indian Mutiny when the following deed took place on 28 September 1857 at Bolandshahr, India for which he and Sergeant Bernard Diamond were awarded the Victoria Cross:

"For an act of valour performed in action against the rebels and mutineers at Boolundshur, on the 28th September, 1857, when these two soldiers evinced the most determined bravery in working their gun under a very heavy fire of musketry, whereby they cleared the road of the enemy, after every other man belonging to it had been either killed or disabled by wounds. (Despatch of Major Turner, Bengal Horse Artillery, dated Boolundshur, 2nd October, 1857.)"

In the months after his VC action, Fitzgerald took part in operations around Lucknow.

Returning to the UK, he was discharged from the army at Canterbury, Kent, in June 1863 and appears to have died in India in 1884.

Fitzgerald's VC and Indian Mutiny Medal are currently held by Bristol Museum.
