= John Barry (VC) =

Recipient of the Victoria Cross (1873–1901)

John Barry VC
- Born: 1 February 1873; Kilkenny, Ireland
- Died: 8 January 1901 (aged 27); Monument Hill, Belfast, Transvaal
- Burial place: Belfast Cemetery, Traansvaal
- Military career
- Allegiance: United Kingdom
- Branch: British Army
- Service years: 1890–1901 †
- Rank: Private
- Units: Royal Irish Regiment
- Conflicts: Tochi Expedition; Second Boer War
- Awards: Victoria Cross

John Barry (1 February 1873 – 8 January 1901), born St Mary's parish, Kilkenny, Ireland, was an Irish recipient of the Victoria Cross, the highest and most prestigious award for gallantry in the face of the enemy that can be awarded to British and Commonwealth forces.

Barry was 27 years old, and a private in the 1st Battalion, the Royal Irish Regiment, British Army, during the Second Boer War when the following deed took place on 7/8 January 1901 at Monument Hill, South Africa, for which he was (posthumously) awarded the VC:

During the night attack on the 7th and 8th January, 1901, on Monument Hill, Private Barry, although surrounded and threatened by the Boers at the time, smashed the breach of the Maxim gun, thus rendering it useless to its captors, and it was in doing this splendid act for his country that he met his death. (Note: On 8 August 1902, as a result of a revision in the policy in the war office which allowed posthumous awards of the Victoria Cross, Private Barry along with other men who had fallen during the recent war in South Africa, in the performance of acts of valour which would in the opinion of the Commander in Chief have entitled them to a Victoria Cross had they survived.)

His VC is on display at the Lord Ashcroft Gallery in the Imperial War Museum, London.

The Maxim gun is currently in the collection of the National Army Museum
