= Patrick Carlin =

Recipient of the Victoria Cross

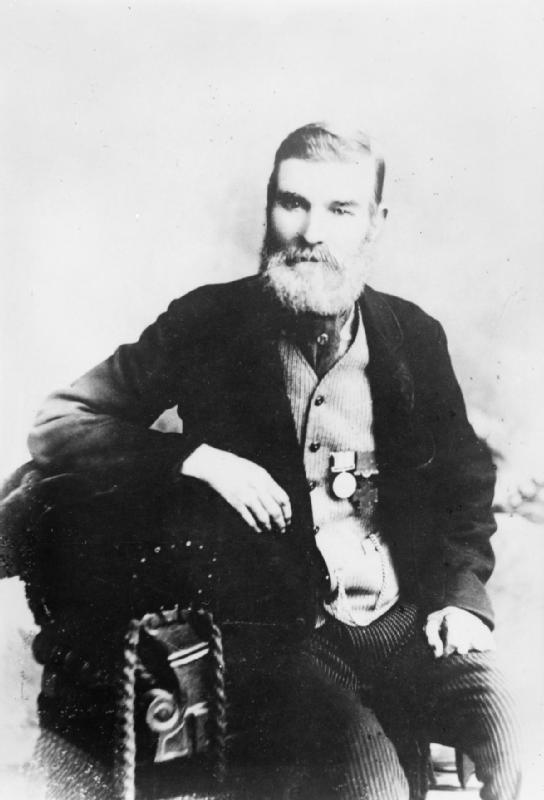
- Born: 1832; Belfast, Ireland
- Died: 11 May 1895 (aged 62-63); Belfast
- Burial place: Friar's Bush graveyard, Stranmillis
- Military career
- Allegiance: United Kingdom
- Branch: British Army
- Rank: Private
- Units: 13th Regiment of Foot
- Conflicts: Indian Mutiny
- Awards: Victoria Cross

Patrick Carlin VC (1832 – 11 May 1895), of Belfast, County Antrim, was an Irish recipient of the Victoria Cross, the highest and most prestigious award for gallantry in the face of the enemy that can be awarded to British and Commonwealth forces.

== VC action ==
When Carlin was approximately 26 years old, he was serving as a private in the 13th (1st Somersetshire) (Prince Albert's Light Infantry) Regiment of Foot of the British Army during the Indian Mutiny when on 6 April 1858 at Azumgurh, India, he did the deed for which he was awarded the Victoria Cross:

For the Act of Bravery recorded in a General Order, issued by the Commander-in-Chief in India, of which the following is a copy:

Head- Quarters, Allahabad, June 29, 1858.
" GENERAL ORDER.
" The Commander-in-Chief in India directs that the undermentioned Soldier, of the 13th Foot, be presented, in the name of Her Most Gracious Majesty, with a Medal of the Victoria Cross, for valour and daring in the field, viz.:
Private Patrick Carlin, No. 3611, of the 13th Foot, for rescuing, on the 6th of April, 1858, a wounded Naick of the 4th Madras Rifles, in the field of battle, after killing, with the Naick's sword, a mutineer sepoy, who fired at him whilst bearing off his wounded comrade on his shoulders.

(Signed) C. CAMPBELL, General, Commander-in-Chief, East Indies.

== Further information ==
He died in the Belfast Union Infirmary on 11 May 1895, and was buried in the Friar's Bush graveyard on Stranmillis Road, Belfast; he has no memorial. The Board of Guardians Minute Book records that he died of exhaustion at the age of 60 on 11 May 1895. Although he is believed to be buried in Friar's Bush graveyard, there is a view that his grave might be in one of the two sections of the old Donegall Road (Blackstaff Road) graveyard; now taken over by new housing and the Arellian Nursery ground.

His Victoria Cross is displayed at The Somerset Light Infantry Museum, Taunton, Somerset.
