= Denis Dynon =

Irish recipient of the Victoria Cross

- Born: September 1822; Kilmannon, Queen's County
- Died: 16 February 1863 (aged 40-41); Dublin, Ireland
- Military career
- Allegiance: United Kingdom
- Branch: British Army
- Rank: Sergeant
- Units: 44th Regiment of Foot; 53rd Regiment of Foot
- Conflicts: First Anglo-Sikh War; Second Anglo-Sikh War; Indian Mutiny
- Awards: Victoria Cross

Denis Dynon VC (September 1822 – 16 February 1863) was an Irish recipient of the Victoria Cross, the highest and most prestigious award for gallantry in the face of the enemy that can be awarded to British and Commonwealth forces.

== Details ==
Born in Kilmannon, Queen's County, he first enlisted in the 44th Regiment of Foot, transferring into the 53rd Regiment of Foot in 1844. He served in the Sutlej Campaign of 1845-46 (battles of Aliwal and Sobraon) and the Punjab Campaign of 1848–49.

Dynon was about 35 years old, and a sergeant in the (later The King's Shropshire Light Infantry), British Army during the Indian Mutiny when the following deed took place on 2 October 1857 at Ghota Behar, India for which he and Lieutenant John Charles Campbell Daunt were awarded the VC:

53rd Regiment. No. 2165 Serjeant Denis Dynon
Lieutenant Daunt and Serjeant Dynon are recommended for conspicuous gallantry in action, on the 2nd of October, 1857, with the Mutineers of the Ramgurh Battalion at Ghota Behar, in capturing two guns, particularly the last, when they rushed at and captured it by pistoling the gunners, who were mowing the detachment down with grape, one-third of which were hors de combat at the time

== Further information ==
He was forced to leave the army due to ill health and was admitted to Kilmainham Hospital in Dublin. He died on 16 February 1863. His burial place is unknown. His VC is on display in the Lord Ashcroft Gallery at the Imperial War Museum, London.
