= The Irish Sword =

- Discipline: Military history of Ireland
- Language: English
- Edited by: Kenneth Ferguson

Publication details
- History: 1949–present
- Publisher: Military History Society of Ireland (Ireland)
- Frequency: Biannual

Standard abbreviations
- ISO 4: Ir. Sword

Indexing
- ISSN: 0021-1389
- OCLC no.: 53989036

Links
- Journal homepage

The Irish Sword is the official journal of the Military History Society of Ireland containing articles on the military history of Ireland, book reviews, notes, notices, queries, illustrations and proceedings.

It includes information on subjects such as "West Cork and the Elizabethan wars" and the experiences of Irish soldiers in Swedish service.

The journal has been published since 1949, normally with two issues a year. The editor-in-chief is Kenneth Ferguson. Gerard Anthony Hayes-McCoy was founder editor, editing the journal for the first ten years to 1959. Kevin Danaher edited from 1960 to 1971.
