= The Register of the Victoria Cross =

Reference work

- Genre: Reference
- Publisher: This England
- Publication date: 1981

The Register of the Victoria Cross is a reference work that provides brief information on every Victoria Cross awarded until the publication date. Each entry provides a summary of the deed, along with a photograph of the recipient and the following details where applicable or available–rank, unit, other decorations, date of gazette, place/date of birth, place/date of death, memorials, town/county connections, and any remarks. The book was first published by the quarterly magazine, This England in 1981, a revised and enlarged edition in 1988 and a third edition in 1997. There is no editor noted on the cover page or the title page, but Nora Buzzell is acknowledged in all three editions, especially in the 1988 and 1997 editions as "compiled and researched for This England by Nora Buzzell".

== The book ==
The book was written to be a single volume listing all award recipients, together with details of birth, place of deed, town or county connections and other relevant information.

The first edition of The Register was published in 1981, a year before the Falklands conflict when two more VCs were awarded. The revised and enlarged second edition, published in 1988, includes brief accounts of the deeds for which the VC was awarded. A third edition was published with amendments and new material in 1997.

== This England ==
This book was commissioned and published by This England "to create a definitive and lasting work of reference as a tribute to the bravery of the men themselves."

Since its foundation in 1856, there have been many claims, particularly among family descendants, that a kinsman had received the Victoria Cross. Until this book was published, those claims have been difficult to prove or deny without access to Ministry of Defence files and other Service lists, resulting in lingering disputes.

== Details of publication ==
Third Edition, 352 pages, This England, 1997 (ISBN 0-906324-27-0) hardback. Compiled and researched for This England by Nora Buzzell.
