= Buffs (Royal East Kent Regiment) =

British Army infantry regiment from 1572 to 1961

Royal East Kent Regiment ("The Buffs"); 3rd Regiment of Foot
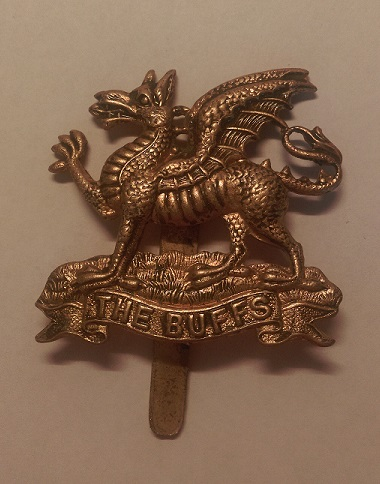
- Cap badge of the regiment
- Active: 1572–1961
- Country: Kingdom of England (1572–1707); Kingdom of Great Britain (1707–1800); United Kingdom (1801–1961)
- Branch: British Army
- Type: Line infantry
- Role: Infantry
- Garrison/HQ: Howe Barracks, Canterbury
- Nicknames: Howard's Buffs; The Old Buffs; The Resurrectionists
- Mottos: Veteri Frondescit Honore; Latin: "Its Ancient Honour Flourishes"; "Its Ancient Honour is Ever-Green"
- Colours: Buff Facings
- March: Quick: The Buffs; Slow: The Men of Kent
- Anniversaries: Albuhera Day (16 May).
- Engagements: Corunna (17 January 1809); Albuhera (16 May 1811)

Commanders
- Notable commanders: Colonel Charles Churchill (1689–1707); John Campbell, 2nd Duke of Argyll (1707–1713); Archibald Douglas, 2nd Earl of Forfar (1713–1715); Lieutenant-General Thomas Howard (1737–1749); Colonel Sir George Howard (1749–1763).

The Buffs (Royal East Kent Regiment), formerly the 3rd Regiment of Foot, was a line infantry regiment of the British Army that was traditionally raised in the English county of Kent and garrisoned at Canterbury. It originated in 1572 and was therefore one of the oldest regiments in the British Army, in which it ranked third in order of precedence.

It provided distinguished service over a period of almost four hundred years, in which it earned one hundred and sixteen battle honours. In 1881, under the Childers Reforms, it was named the Buffs (East Kent Regiment) and later, on 3 June 1935, was renamed the Buffs (Royal East Kent Regiment).

In 1961, it was amalgamated with the Queen's Own Royal West Kent Regiment to form the Queen's Own Buffs, The Royal Kent Regiment, which was later merged, on 31 December 1966, with the Queen's Royal Surrey Regiment, the Royal Sussex Regiment and the Middlesex Regiment (Duke of Cambridge's Own) to form the Queen's Regiment. This regiment was, in turn, amalgamated with the Royal Hampshire Regiment, in September 1992, to create the Princess of Wales's Royal Regiment (Queen's and Royal Hampshires).

== History ==
=== Formation to end 17th century ===
The Dutch fight for independence from Spain in the 1568–1648 Eighty Years' War was supported by Protestants across Europe; the origins of the regiment were Thomas Morgan's Company of Foot, a group of 300 volunteers from the London Trained Bands formed in 1572. In 1586, these English and Scottish volunteer units were brought together in the Scots Brigade, which in various formats served in the Dutch military until 1782.

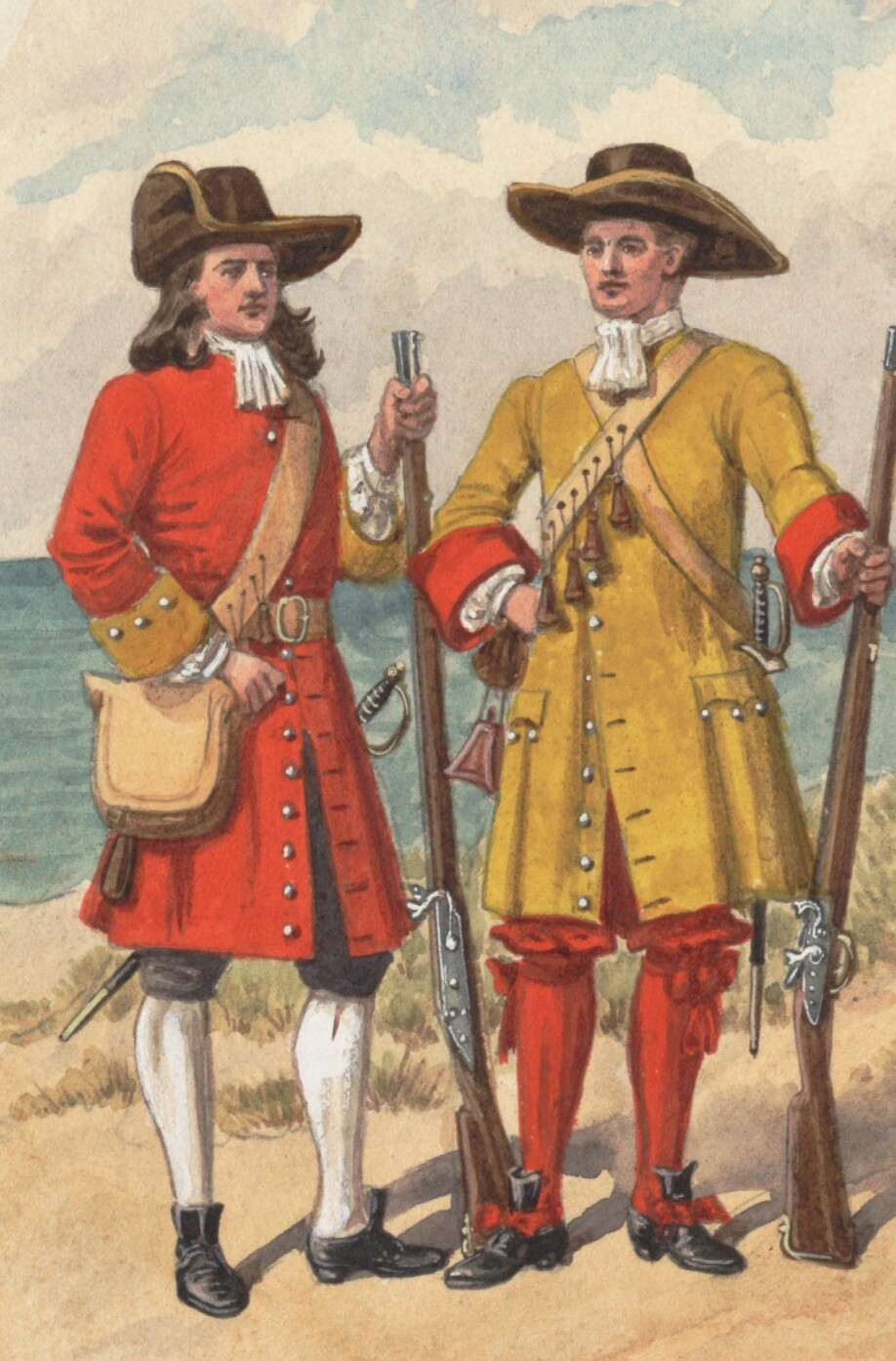
A regimental private (left) in 1665

When the Second Anglo-Dutch War started in 1665, the brigade's units were ordered to swear loyalty to the Stadtholder and those who disobeyed were cashiered. Using his own funds, Sir George Downing, the English ambassador to the Netherlands, raised the Holland Regiment from the starving remnants of those who refused to sign. In 1665, it was known as the 4th (The Holland Maritime) Regiment and by 1668 as the 4th (The Holland) Regiment.

When the Third Anglo-Dutch War began in 1672, the Duke of Buckingham was authorised to recruit an additional eight companies but the two countries made peace in the February 1674 Treaty of Westminster. These men were incorporated into the Anglo-Scots Dutch Brigade and fought in the 1672–1678 Franco-Dutch War; in November 1688, it accompanied William III to England. It was transferred onto the English military establishment as the "4th The Lord High Admiral's Regiment" and in 1689 became the 3rd (Prince George of Denmark's) Regiment of Foot. During the 1689–1697 Nine Years War, it served in the Low Countries, including the battles of Walcourt, Steenkerque and Landen. It returned to England when the war ended with the 1697 Treaty of Ryswick.

=== 18th century ===
During the War of the Spanish Succession, it served in Marlborough campaigns, including the battles of Blenheim, Ramillies, Malplaquet and Oudenarde, before returning to England in August 1714. Until the 1751 reforms, units were commonly named after their current colonel; it reverted to this practice when Prince George of Denmark died in 1708, although it was also referred to as the 'Holland Regiment' or "Buffs" after its coat facings. It was also sometimes called "The Old Buffs", to distinguish it from "The Young Buffs", the 31st Foot.

Apart from the 1719 Vigo expedition, the next 25 years were spent on garrison duty in England and Scotland. It returned to Flanders in 1742 during the War of the Austrian Succession, as Thomas Howard's regiment; to distinguish it from that led by Sir Charles Howard, one became the "Buffs", and the other the Green Howards. It fought at the Battle of Dettingen in June 1743 and at the Battle of Fontenoy in May 1745. With the outbreak of the 1745 Rising, it was sent to Scotland, taking part in the Battle of Falkirk Muir in January 1746 and Battle of Culloden in April 1746. It returned to the Netherlands in April 1747 and saw action at the Battle of Lauffeld in July.

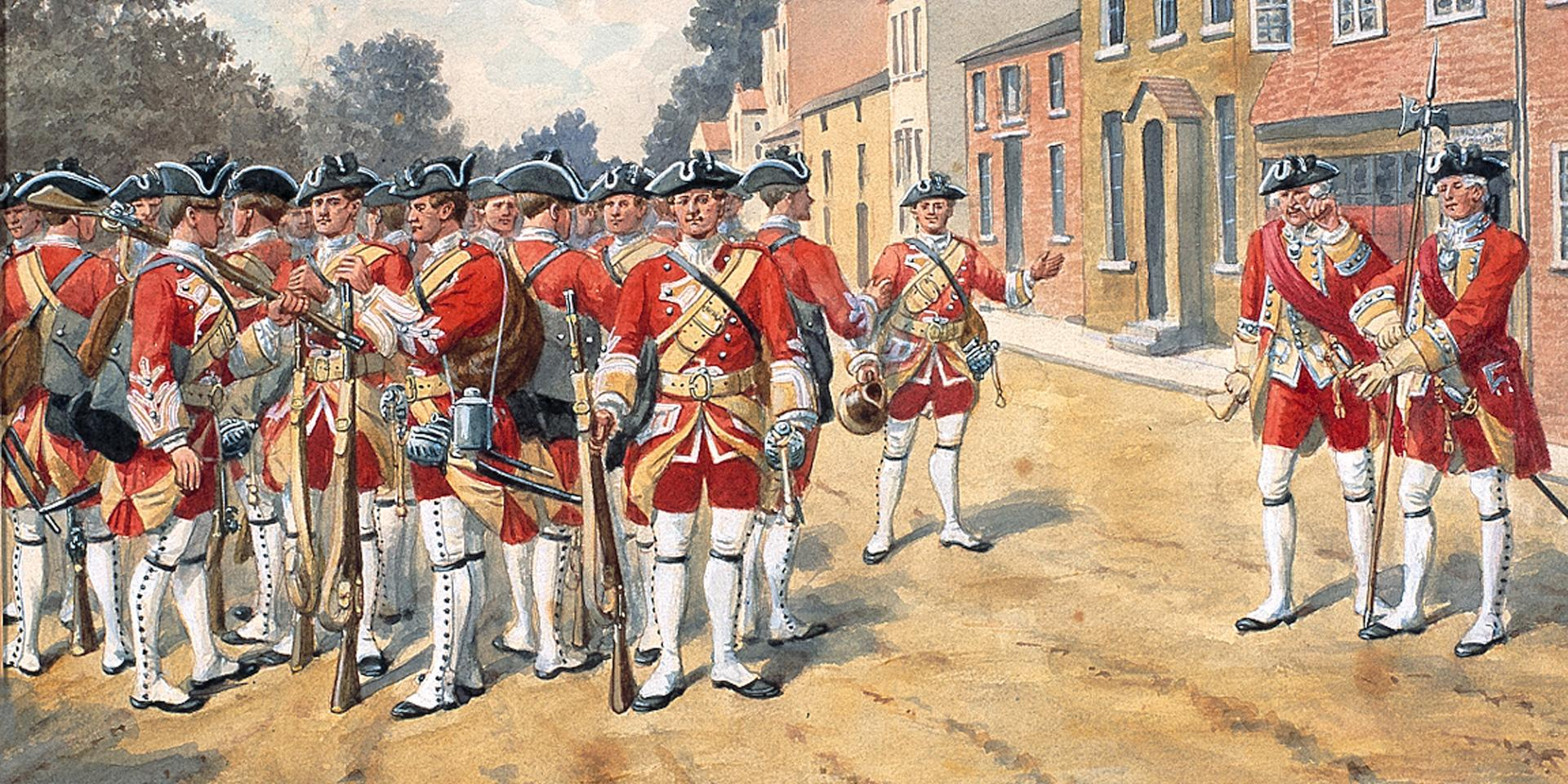
Regimental troops in England in 1751

c. 1751 painting of a regimental grenadier (right)

Following the 1748 Treaty of Aix-la-Chapelle, it spent the next ten years on garrison duty in England; in 1751, it was retitled the 3rd Regiment of Foot, "The Buffs". The Seven Years' War began in 1756; in autumn 1758, the regiment was posted to the West Indies, taking part in the January 1759 attacks on Martinique and Guadeloupe. After returning home, it took part in the capture of Belle Île in June 1761. It then moved to Portugal and fought at the Battle of Valencia de Alcántara in August 1762 before returning to England in spring 1771.

=== French Revolutionary Wars ===
The regiment was sent to the West Indies in December 1795 for service in the French Revolutionary Wars. It took part in the capture of Grenada in March 1796 and of Saint Vincent in June 1796 and the capture of Trinidad in February 1797 and of various other islands in March 1801 before returning home in autumn 1802.

=== Napoleonic Wars ===
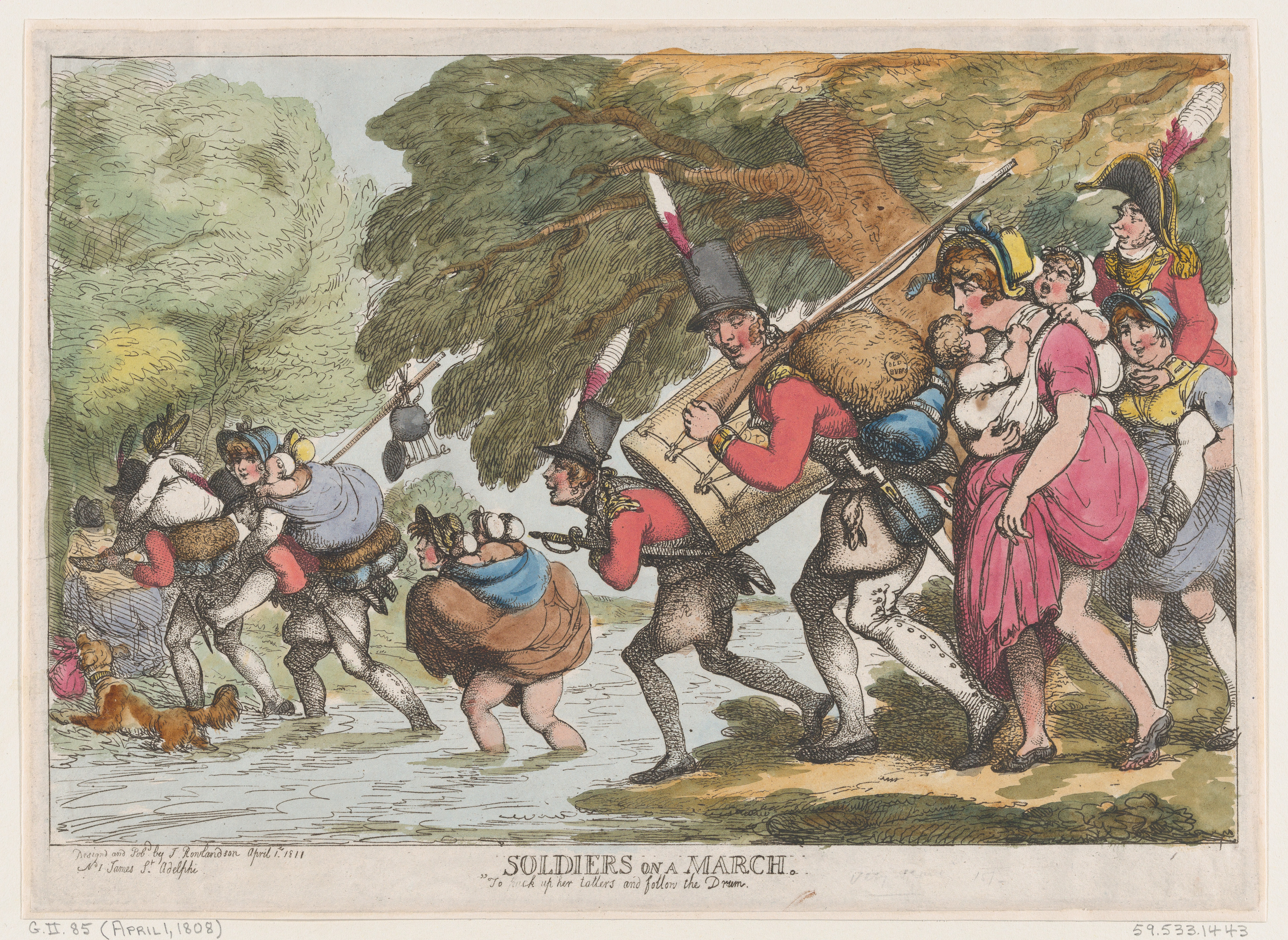
1808 cartoon of the regiment and female camp followers on the march

The regiment embarked for Portugal in August 1808 for service in the Peninsular War. The grenadier company of the regiment served under Sir John Moore at the Battle of Corunna in January 1809 before being evacuated to England later that month. The rest of the regiment remained on the Peninsula and fought at the Battle of Talavera in July 1809 and the Battle of Bussaco in September 1810 before falling back to the Lines of Torres Vedras.

It then saw action at the Battle of Albuera in May 1811 and the Battle of Vitoria in June 1813. At Albuhera the regiment suffered heavy losses (about 400 out of 728) when caught in open order during a hail/rain storm by charging Polish lancers and French hussars.

Following Vitoria the Buffs then pursued the French Army into France and fought at the Battle of the Pyrenees in July 1813, the Battle of Nivelle in November 1813 and the Battle of the Nive in December 1813 as well as the Battle of Orthez in February 1814 and the Battle of Toulouse in April 1814. It became part of the Army of Occupation of France in 1816 before returning home in autumn 1818.

=== Victorian era ===
The regiment had a tour of service from 1821 until 1827 in the British colony of New South Wales. For the duration of their service, The Buffs was divided into four detachments. The first was based in Sydney from 1821. The second arrived in Hobart in 1822. The third, entitled "The Buffs' Headquarters", arrived in Sydney in 1823. The fourth, arrived in Sydney in 1824, but variously saw service throughout the colonies, being stationed at Port Dalrymple, Parramatta, Liverpool, Newcastle, Port Macquarie and Bathurst. The regiment reunited and was transferred to Calcutta in 1827. During their service in New South Wales, The Buffs was commanded by Lieutenant Colonel W. Stewart and Lieutenant Colonel C. Cameron. The regiment also saw action at the siege of Sevastopol in winter 1854 during the Crimean War.

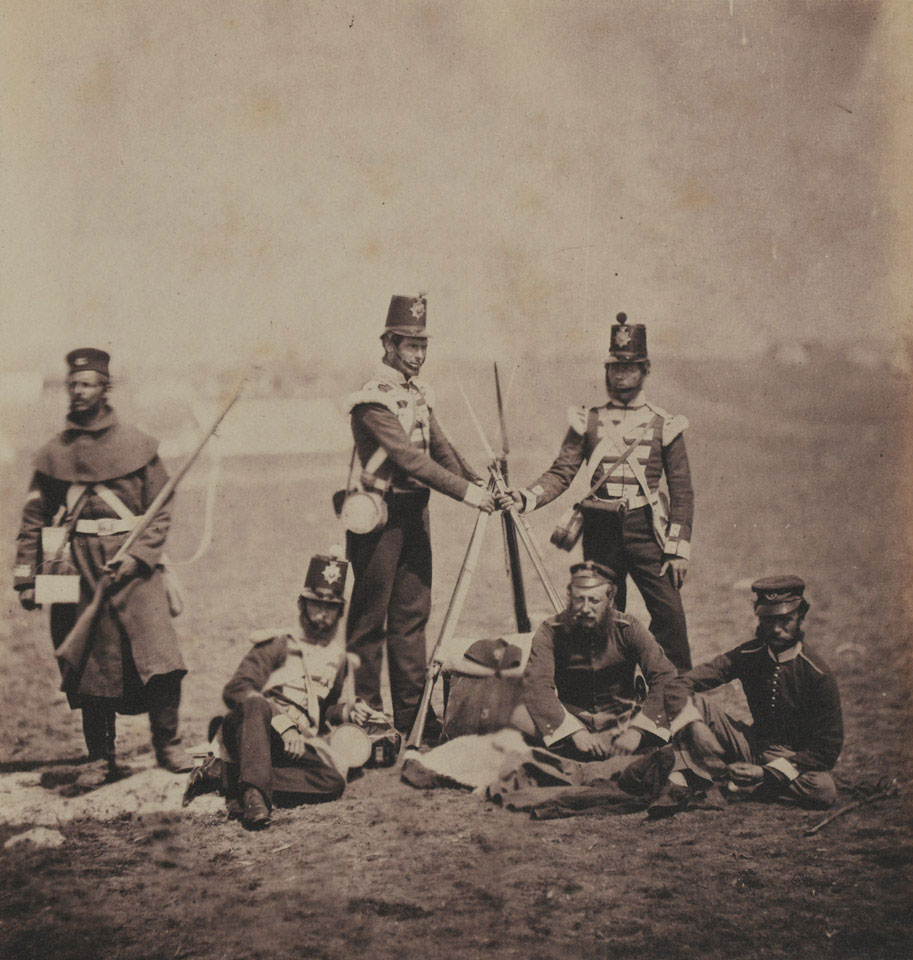
Regimental troops in Crimea, 1855

In 1858, the 2nd Battalion was stationed in Malta. Lieutenant John Cotter, Adjutant of the 2nd Buffs, would shout "Steady, The Buffs!", a phrase which has entered common parlance. The 1st Battalion saw action in the Taku Forts action during the Second Opium War as well as in the Perak War while the 2nd Battalion saw action in the Anglo-Zulu War.

The regiment was not fundamentally affected by the Cardwell Reforms of the 1870s, which gave it a depot at Canterbury Barracks from 1873, or by the Childers reforms of 1881 – as it already possessed two battalions, there was no need for it to amalgamate with another regiment. Under the reforms the regiment became the Buffs (East Kent Regiment) on 1 July 1881. The East Kent Militia became the regiment's 3rd (Militia) Battalion (1881–1953) and its short-lived 4th (Militia) Battalion (1881–1888). At the same time two Kent rifle volunteer corps were redesignated as the 1st Volunteer Battalion and 2nd (The Weald of Kent) Volunteer Battalion of the Buffs.

The 1st Battalion saw action in the Anglo-Egyptian War, was from 1885 stationed at Malta, then moved to India where it saw several postings, including in Shwebo in inland Burma until late 1902 when it moved to Poona.

Regimental sergeants of the 2nd Battalion, Buffs, in Bloemfontein, South Africa, 1900.

The 2nd Battalion, 3rd Battalion, 1st Volunteer (Militia) Battalion and 2nd Volunteer (Weald of Kent) Battalion all saw action during the Second Boer War with Captain Naunton Henry Vertue of the 2nd Battalion serving as brigade major to the 11th Infantry Brigade under Major General Edward Woodgate at the Battle of Spion Kop where he was mortally wounded in January 1900.

Following the end of the war in South Africa in June 1902, 540 officers and men of the 2nd battalion returned to the United Kingdom on the SS St. Andrew leaving Cape Town in early October, and the battalion was subsequently stationed at Dover.

In 1908, the Volunteers and Militia were reorganised nationally, with the former becoming the Territorial Force and the latter the Special Reserve; the regiment now had one Reserve and two Territorial battalions.

=== First World War ===
For service in the First World War, ten additional battalions were raised.

==== Regular Army ====
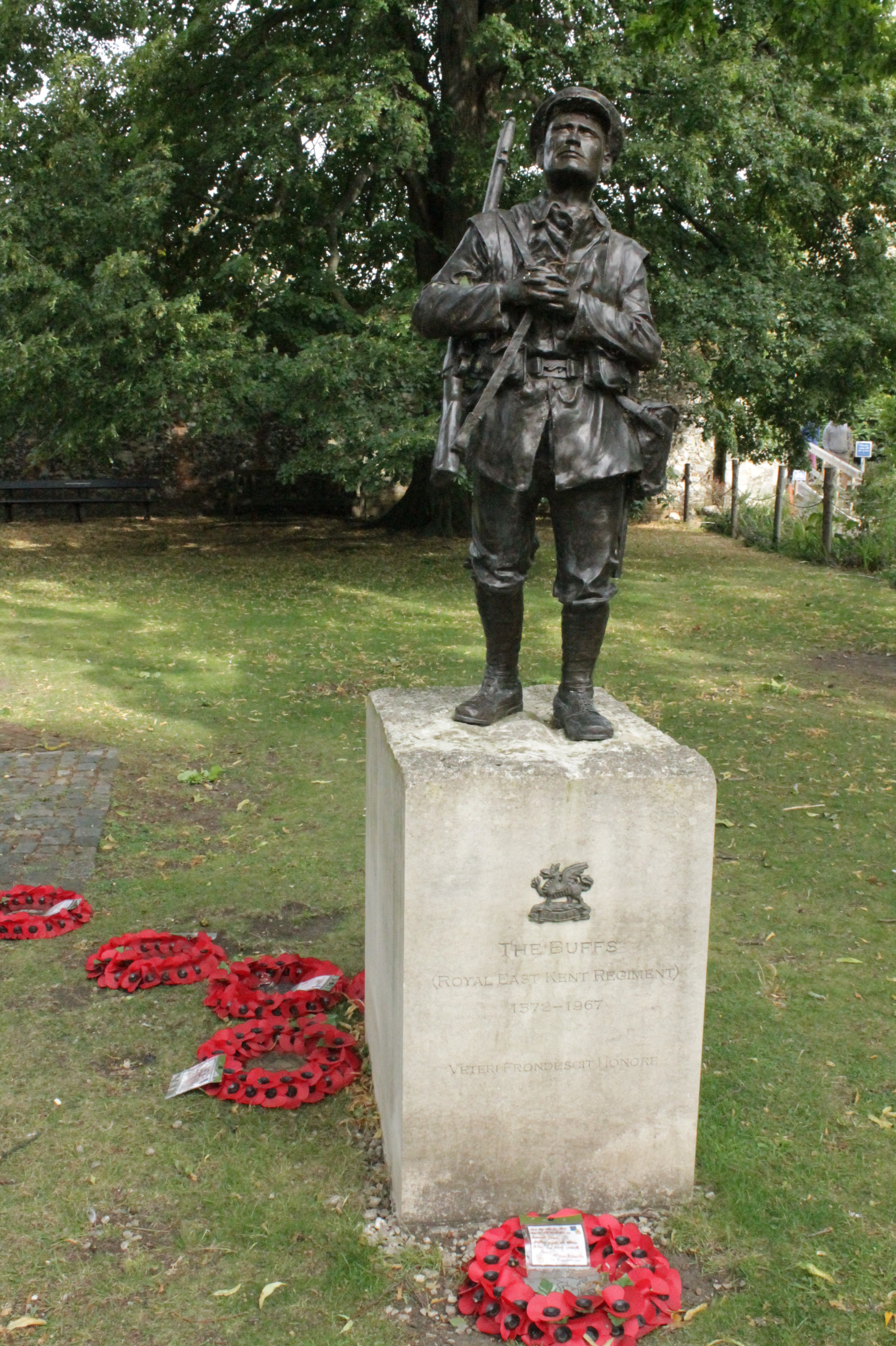
Monument to regiment installed in Canterbury in 1967

The 1st Battalion was based in Fermoy as part of the 16th Brigade in the 6th Division until 12 August 1914 when it moved to Cambridge before landing in France on 8 September 1914. The 2nd Battalion returned from Madras in December 1914 and remained in England as part of the 85th Brigade in the 28th Division; meanwhile the 3rd Battalion remained in Canterbury as a training unit.

==== Territorial Force ====
The 1/4th Battalion sailed for India in October 1914 while the 1/5th (Weald of Kent) Battalion sailed for India in October 1914 and then transferred to Mesopotamia in November 1915. The 2/4th Battalion, the 2/5th (Weald of Kent) Battalion, the 3/4th Battalion and the 3/5th (Weald of Kent) Battalion all remained in England throughout the war while the 10th (Royal East Kent and West Kent Yeomanry) Battalion was formed in Egypt in February 1917 and then transferred to France as part of the 230th Brigade in the 74th Division.

==== New Armies ====
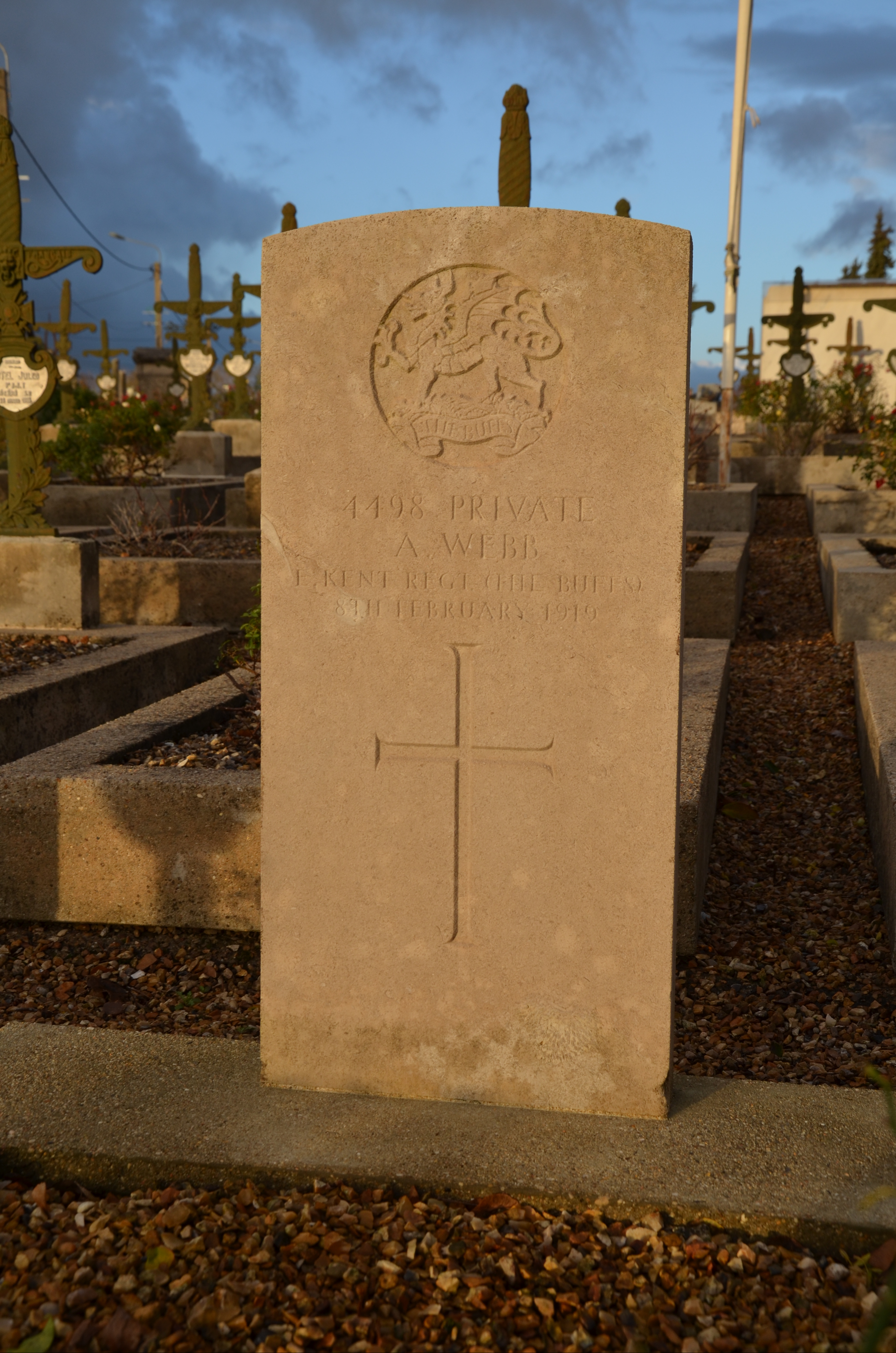
Gravestone of a regimental private who died on 8 February 1919

The 6th (Service) Battalion, 7th (Service) Battalion, 8th (Service) Battalion and 9th (Reserve) Battalion were all formed for active service in France. Corporal William Richard Cotter was awarded the VC whilst serving with the 6th (Service) Battalion.

=== Between the wars ===
After the end of the First World War, a small number of men from several battalions saw action during the Third Anglo-Afghan War in 1919.

In June 1935 King George V celebrated his silver jubilee. This opportunity was taken of granting royal status to four regiments, principally in recognition of their service in the previous war:

On the occasion of His Majesty's Birthday and in commemoration of the completion of the twenty-fifth year of his reign, the King has been graciously pleased... to approve that the following regiments shall in future enjoy the distinction "Royal" and shall henceforth be designated:—

- 5th Royal Inniskilling Dragoon Guards
- The Buffs (Royal East Kent Regiment)
- The Royal Northumberland Fusiliers
- The Royal Norfolk Regiment

=== Second World War ===
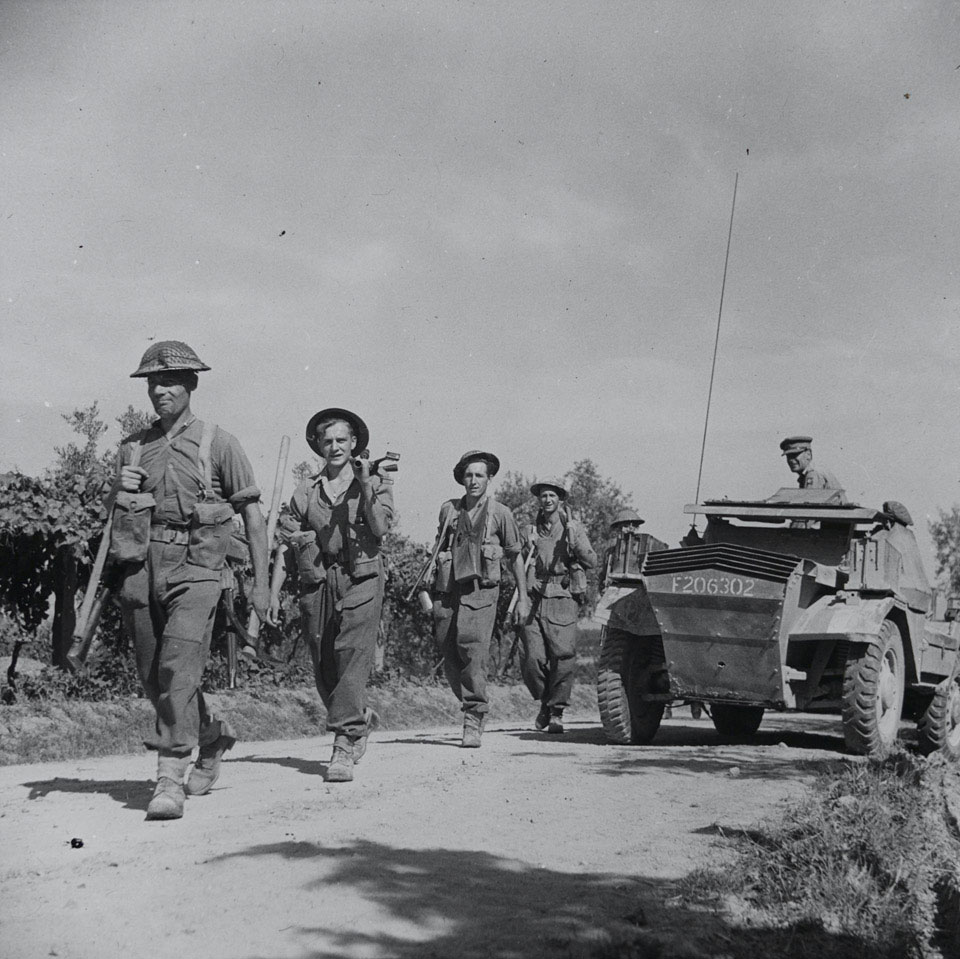
Regimental troops pursuing retreating German forces in Italy, June 1944

The 1st Battalion served in many different brigades and divisions, mainly with British Indian Army units, and fought in many different battles and campaigns such as the North African Campaign, the Italian Campaign and the Battle of Anzio when they were a part of 18th Infantry Brigade, assigned to the 1st Infantry Division where they were involved in some of the fiercest fighting of the war. The 18th Brigade returned to the 1st Armoured Division in August 1944 but, on 1 January 1945, the division was disbanded and 18th Brigade was broken up and used as replacements for other units. The 1st Buffs spent the rest of the war with the 24th Guards Brigade attached to the 56th (London) Infantry Division. With the 56th Division, the battalion fought in Operation Grapeshot, the final offensive in Italy which effectively ended the campaign in Italy.

The 2nd Battalion was sent to France in 1940 with the 132nd Infantry Brigade attached to the 44th (Home Counties) Infantry Division to join the British Expeditionary Force and fought in the short but fierce Battle of Dunkirk, after which it was evacuated back to Britain. The 44th Division was sent to fight in the North African Campaign, where it was broken up due to an apparently poor performance in the Battle of Alam el Halfa despite the division having just the 132nd Brigade under command as other brigades had been detached to other divisions. The 132nd Brigade disbanded and 2nd Buffs was then transferred to the Far East with the 26th Indian Infantry Brigade and remained there for the war. In 1944, the brigade was redesignated the 26th British Infantry Brigade, which itself became part of the 36th British Infantry Division and served with the British Fourteenth Army in the Burma Campaign.

The 4th Battalion Buffs was a 1st Line Territorial Army unit that served with the BEF in France 1940. The battalion was transferred to the island of Malta in 1941 and served throughout the siege. The battalion then joined the 234th Infantry Brigade, which took part in the disastrous Battle of Leros in an attempt to capture the Dodecanese Islands in late 1943. The brigade and other Allied forces, mainly Italian, attempted to hold the island from the Germans, but without success. This was due mainly to German air superiority as the Allies had very few planes to cover them. The 234th Brigade Commander, Robert Tilney, ordered the surrender after many days of resistance and hard fighting.

The 5th Battalion was reformed in 1939 as a 2nd Line duplicate of the 4th Battalion when the Territorial Army was doubled in size. Initially, the 5th Buffs was assigned to the 37th Infantry Brigade, part of the 12th (Eastern) Infantry Division, which was a 2nd Line duplicate of the 44th (Home Counties) Division. However, on 26 October 1939, it was transferred to the Division's 36th Infantry Brigade in exchange for the 2/6th East Surreys. The 5th Buffs, along with the 6th and 7th Royal West Kents, remained in the 36th Brigade for the rest of the war. Like the 2nd and 4th Battalions, it served with the BEF in France in 1940 and fought in the Battle of France and was evacuated at Dunkirk. The 12th Division suffered heavy casualties due mainly to most of the men having little training and the division having no artillery or support units. After returning to England, the division was disbanded in July 1940, due to the casualties it had sustained. In 1942, the 36th Brigade was assigned to the newly raised 78th Division and took part in Operation Torch, the Allied landings in North Africa, followed by the campaign in Tunisia, where the 78th Division, as part of the British First Army, distinguished itself during the crucial capture of Longstop Hill. The division then fought in the Sicilian Campaign, as part of the British Eighth Army. The 5th Buffs and the rest of 78th Division then took part in the fighting in Italy and served there until the 1945 Offensive.

The Buffs also raised many more battalions during the war, mainly for home defence or as training units. None, save the 7th and 11th Battalions, saw active service overseas. The 7th and 11th Battalions were raised in 1940 and were converted to the 141st Regiment Royal Armoured Corps and the 89th Light Anti-Aircraft Regiment, Royal Artillery in 1941 due to the shortage of armoured troops and artillery in the British Army.

=== Post-War ===
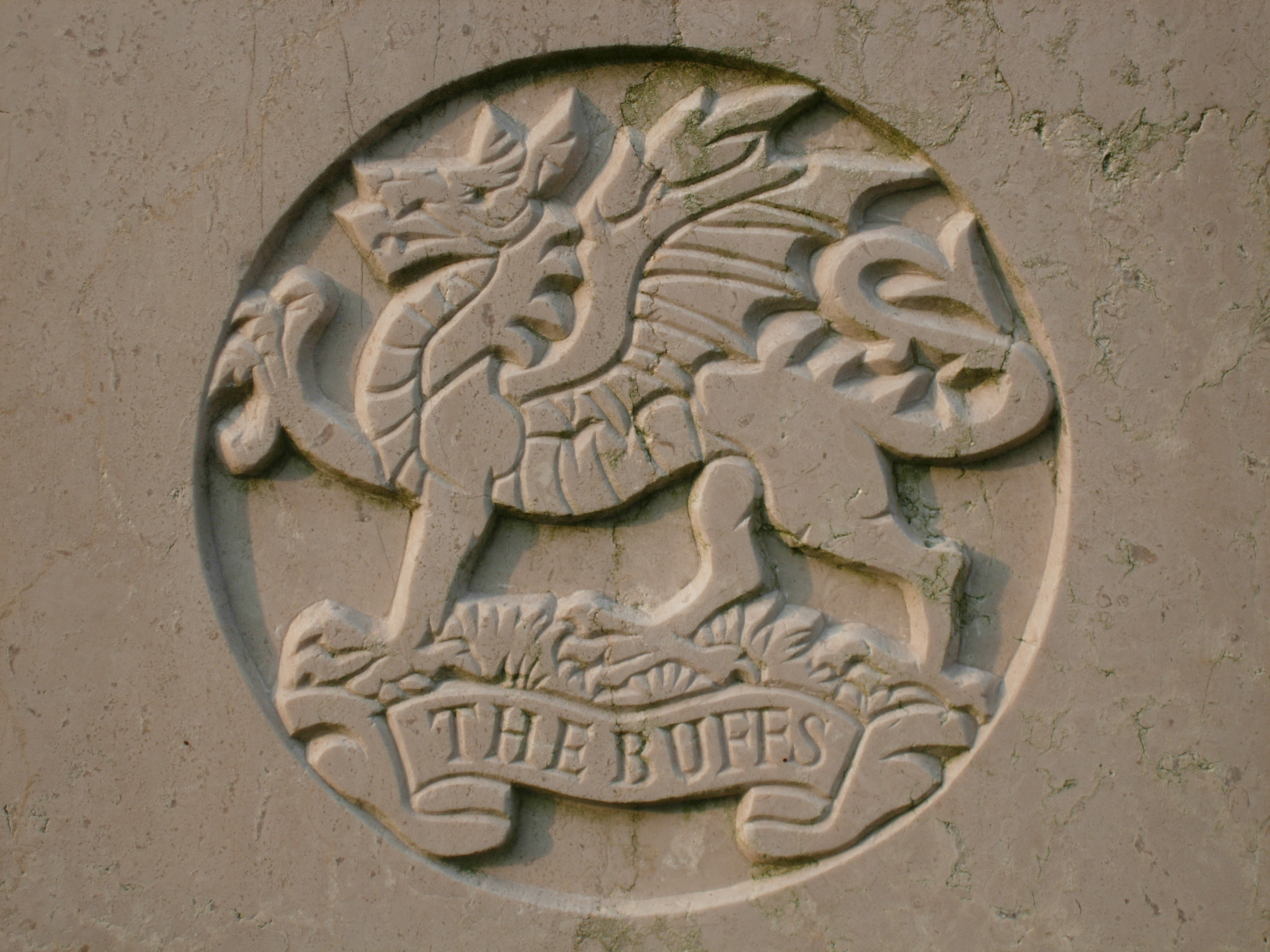
Badge of the regiment as shown on the grave of a regimental private who died in 1947 and was buried at the Stanley Military Cemetery, Hong Kong

When the Territorial Army was reformed in 1947 the 4th and 5th Buffs were merged into a single battalion. In 1956 410 (Kent) Coast Regiment, Royal Artillery, was converted to the infantry role and became 5th Buffs.

In 1961, the regiment was amalgamated with the Queen's Own Royal West Kent Regiment to form the Queen's Own Buffs, The Royal Kent Regiment, which was later merged, on 31 December 1966, with the Queen's Royal Surrey Regiment, the Royal Sussex Regiment and the Middlesex Regiment (Duke of Cambridge's Own) to form the Queen's Regiment. This, in turn, was amalgamated with the Royal Hampshire Regiment, in September 1992, to create the Princess of Wales's Royal Regiment (Queen's and Royal Hampshires).

== Regimental museum ==
The Buffs (Royal East Kent Regiment) still has some exhibits at Beaney House, although most of the collection was subsumed into the National Army Museum in 2000.

== Colonels-in-Chief ==
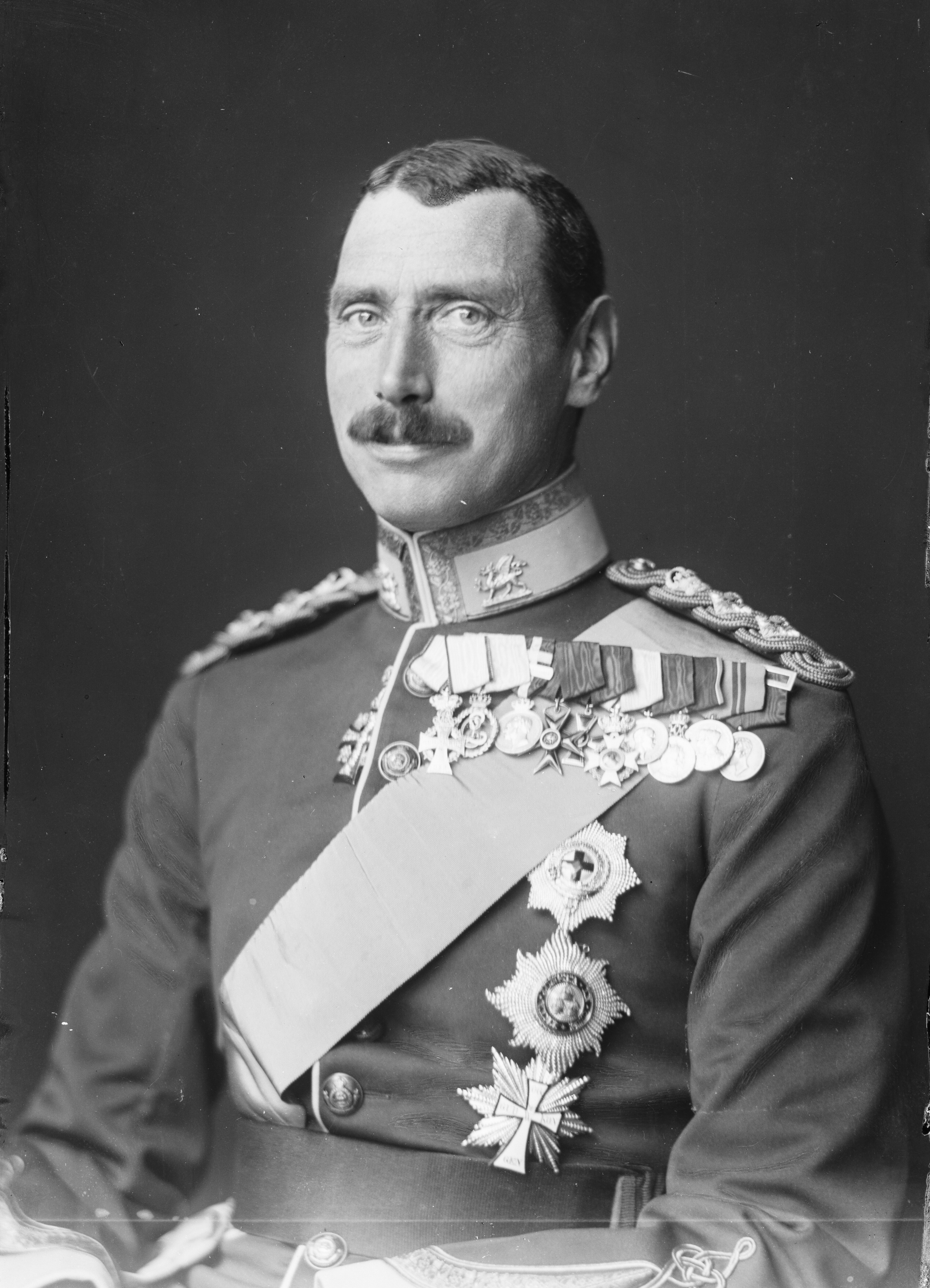
Christian X in Colonel-in-Chief uniform

The Colonels-in-Chief were as follows:

- 1689–1708 HRH Prince George of Denmark KG
- 1906–1914 HM King Frederik VIII of Denmark KG GCB GCVO
- 1914–1947 HM King Christian X of Denmark KG GCB GCVO GCStJ
- 1947–1961: HM King Frederik IX of Denmark KG GCB GCVO GCStJ

== Colonels ==
The Colonels were as follows:

The Holland Regiment

- 1665–1668 Col. Robert Sidney
- 1668–1673 Maj-Gen. Sir Walter Vane
- 1673–1682 Lt-Gen. the Duke of Buckingham
- 1682–1684 Col. Philip Stanhope, 2nd Earl of Chesterfield
- 1684–1685 Lt-Gen. the Duke of Buckingham
- 1685–1688 Brig-Gen. Sir Theophilus Oglethorpe

Prince George of Denmark's Regiment (1689–1708)

- 1688–1707 Gen. Charles Churchill
- 1707–1708 F.M. John Campbell, 2nd Duke of Argyll

Named after the current colonel of The Buffs (1708–1751)

- 1708–1711 FM the Duke of Argyll
- 1711–1713 Col. John Selwyn
- 1713–1715 Brig-Gen. Archibald Douglas, 2nd Earl of Forfar
- 1716–1725 Gen. Sir Charles Wills, KB (also 1st Guards, 30th Foot)
- 1726–1729 Col. Thomas Pitt, 1st Earl of Londonderry
- 1729–1737 Lt-Gen. William Tatton
- 1737–1749 Lt-Gen. Thomas Howard
- 1749–1751 F.M. Sir George Howard, KB

3rd Regiment of Foot, or The Buffs – (1751)

- 1751–1763 FM Sir George Howard
- 1763–1764 Col. John Craufurd
- 1764–1768 Maj-Gen. Ralph Burton
- 1768–1779 F.M. Sir Jeffery Amherst, 1st Baron Amherst, KB
- 1779–1782 Lt-Gen. William Style

3rd (the East Kent) Regiment of Foot – (1782)

- 1782–1786 Lt-Gen. William Style
- 1786–1809 Gen. Thomas Hall
- 1809–1815 Gen. Charles Leigh
- 1815–1829 Lt-Gen. Sir Henry Clinton, GCB, GCH
- 1829–1832 Gen. Sir George Don, GCB, GCH
- 1832–1845 Gen. Kenneth Alexander Howard, 1st Earl of Effingham, GCB
- 1845–1854 Gen. Sir Henry King, CB, KCH, KC
- 1854–1857 Lt-Gen. Sir Nathaniel Thorn, KCB, KH
- 1857 Lt-Gen. John Wharton Frith
- 1857 Maj-Gen. Sir Henry Havelock, KCB [died at Lucknow]
- 1857–1860 Lt-Gen. Berkeley Drummond
- 1860–1863 Gen. The Hon. Charles Grey
- 1863–1864 Lt-Gen. John Wharton Frith
- 1864–1870 Lt-Gen. Day Hort Macdowall
- 1870–1874 Lt-Gen. The Hon. Sir James Lindsay, KCMG
- 1874–1882 Gen. William Craig Emilius Napier

The Buffs (East Kent Regiment) – (1881)

- 1882–1909 Gen. Sir Julius Augustus Robert Raines, GCB
- 1909 Maj-Gen. Frederick Taylor Hobson
- 1909–1914 Maj-Gen. Robert George Kekewich
- 1914–1928 Gen. Sir Arthur Henry Fitzroy Paget, GCB, KCVO
- 1928–1937 Maj-Gen. Sir Arthur Lynden Lynden-Bell, KCB, KCMG

The Buffs (Royal East Kent Regiment) – (1935)

- 1937–1943 Maj-Gen. Sir John Kennedy, GBE, CB, CMG, DSO
- 1943–1953 Maj-Gen. The Hon. Percy Gerald Scarlett, CB, MC
- 1953–1961 Maj-Gen. Valentine Boucher, CB, CBE [later Dep. Col. Queen's Own Buffs]

== Notable soldiers ==
- During the Battle of Albuhera. On 16 May 1811, Ensign Thomas, carried the Regimental Colour: he was shot dead and the colour captured but later retrieved. The King's Colour was carried by Lieutenant Matthew Latham. He was attacked by several French hussars, one of whom seizing the flag-staff, and rising in his stirrup, aimed a stroke at the head of the gallant Latham, which failed in cutting him down, but which sadly mutilated him, severing one side of the face and nose; he still however, struggled with the dragoon, and exclaimed, "I will surrender it only with my life." A second sabre struck severing his left arm and hand, in which he held the staff, from his body. Latham, however, then seized the staff with his right hand, throwing away his sword, and continued to struggle with his opponents, now increased in number; when ultimately thrown down, trampled upon and pierced by the spears of the Polish lancers, his last effort was to tear the flag from the staff as he thus lay prostrate, and to thrust it partly into the breast of his jacket where it was later found: the action is commemorated in silver by "The Latham Centrepiece" first produced in 1872 by S Smith & Co King St Covent Garden, now in the Regimental museum.
- During the Battle of Taku Forts, Private John Moyse was captured: he was later executed by Chinese soldiers for refusing to kow-tow to a local mandarin. His act of defiance was later immortalised in The Private of the Buffs, a poem by Sir Francis Hastings Doyle.
- Among the small garrison of 1879 Rorke's Drift (Zulu Land) was Sgt Frederick Milne (2260) 2nd Battalion, The Buffs. Said to have found and retrieved the watercart during the night. He survived the battle and soon left the service.
- Colonel Richard Stanley Hawks Moody CB. Moody was a distinguished officer, and later a historian, of the regiment. He was second in command of the regiment when it was sent to relieve the Siege of Malakand in 1897, for which he was mentioned in dispatches, and during which he fought alongside Winston Churchill, who mentions him in Chapter XII (At Inayat Kila) of The Story of the Malakand Field Force. Moody served with the regiment in the Chitral Expedition, in which he was part of General William Forbes Gatacre's flying column. He at the request of the regiment wrote The Historical Records of The Buffs (East Kent Regiment), 3rd Regiment of Foot, 1914–1919, which was published in 1923, and the first copy of which he gave to the Royal Library, Windsor, in 1922.
- The war artist Ernest Stafford Carlos was commissioned into the 8th Battalion in 1916, arriving in the Artois sector of the Western Front early in 1917. His sketches, cartoons and paintings record life in and behind the lines at that time. He was killed in action during the Battle of Messines on 14 or 15 June 1917 while his unit was assaulting a German held spoil heap near Zillebeke in Flanders, a feature that became known as "Buff's Bank". He is buried close to the battlefield at Chester Farm Commonwealth War Graves Commission Cemetery.
- Among the soldiers in the 10th Battalion, one soldier showed bravery in the Battle of Épehy on 18 September 1918. This was Private Percy James Fellows, a Lewis gunner who was mortally wounded while facing the enemy. He was serving with the 230th Brigade of the 74th (Yeomanry) Division. He died of wounds suffered during the Final Advance in Artois on 13 October 1918.
- Bernard George Ellis was awarded the Albert Medal in 1918. This was transferred to a George Cross in 1971.
- Captain William Douglas-Home, who served in the 7th battalion in the Second World War, refused to obey orders because he feared that thousands of French civilians would be killed, which resulted in his imprisonment. After the war he became a successful playwright.
- Alec MacKelden, Lieutenant, served with the regiment during the Italian Campaign, including actions at Anzio and the Gothic Line. During April–May 1945 he commanded the point platoon of "B" Company, leading assaults across the Canale Bianco under heavy fire, for which he was awarded the Military Cross for gallantry and devotion to duty. After emigrating to Australia in 1955, he served as Managing Director of Cerebos Australia (1962–1982) and as Chairman of the Skin and Cancer Foundation of Australia (1986–1995), for which he was appointed a Member of the Order of Australia (AM) in the 1995 Australia Day Honours.

== Freedom of the City of London ==
The regiment was awarded the Freedom of the City of London, giving them the right to march through the city.

== Battle honours ==
The honours in bold were worn on the Colours.

- Earlier Wars
  - **Blenheim, Ramillies, Oudenarde, Malplaquet, Dettingen, Guadeloupe 1759, Douro, Talavera, Albuhera, Vittoria, Pyrenees, Nivelle, Nive, Orthes, Toulouse, Peninsula, Punniar, Sevastopol, Taku Forts, South Africa 1879, Chitral, Relief of Kimberley, Paardeberg, South Africa 1900–02**
- First World War:
  - **Aisne 1914**, Armentières 1914, **Ypres 1915 '17**, Gravenstafel, St. Julien, Frezenberg, Bellewaarde, Hooge 1915, **Loos**, **Somme 1916 '18**, Albert 1916 '18, Bazentin, Delville Wood, Pozières, Flers-Courcelette, Morval, Thiepval, Le Transloy, Ancre Heights, Ancre 1916 '18, **Arras 1917**, Scarpe 1917, Messines 1917, Pilckem, Passchendaele, Cambrai 1917 '18, St. Quentin, Avre, Amiens, Bapaume 1918, **Hindenburg Line**, Épéhy, St. Quentin Canal, Selle, Sambre, France and Flanders 1914–18, **Struma**, Doiran 1918, Macedonia 1915–18, Gaza, **Jerusalem**, Tell 'Asur, Palestine 1917–18, Aden, Tigris 1916, Kut al Amara 1917, **Baghdad**, Mesopotamia 1915–18
- Second World War:
  - Defence of Escaut, St. Omer-La Bassée, Withdrawal to Seine, **North-West Europe 1940**, Sidi Suleiman, **Alem Hamza**, Alam el Halfa, **El Alamein**, El Agheila, Advance on Tripoli, Tebaga Gap, El Hamma, Akarit, Djebel Azzag 1943, **Robaa Valley**, Djebel Bech Chekaoui, Heidous, Medjez Plain, Longstop Hill 1943, North Africa 1941–43, Centuripe, Monte Rivoglia, **Sicily 1943**, Termoli, **Trigno**, Sangro, **Anzio**, Cassino I, Liri Valley, Aquino, Rome, Trasimene Line, Coriano, Monte Spaduro, Senio, **Argenta Gap**, Italy 1943–45, **Leros**, Middle East 1943, Malta 1940–42, **Shweli**, Myitson, Burma 1945

== Victoria Cross ==
The following members of the regiment were awarded the Victoria Cross:

- Major (Brevet Lieutenant-Colonel, later General) Frederick Francis Maude, Crimean War
- Private (later Corporal) John Connors, Crimean War
- Corporal (later Colour-Sergeant) James Smith, First Mohmand Campaign
- Lance Corporal (acting Corporal) William Richard Cotter, World War I

== Uniform and insignia ==
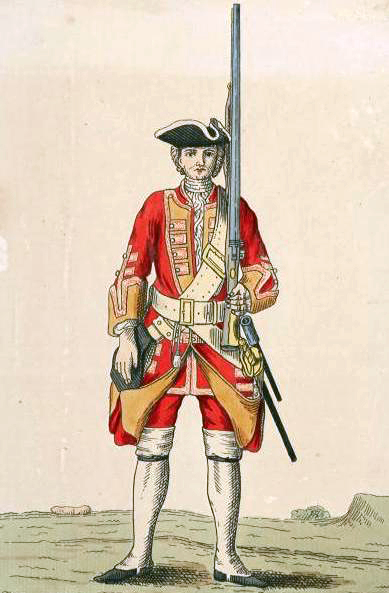
Soldier of the 3rd Foot in 1742

In 1667 the Holland Regiment is recorded as wearing "red jackets lined with yellow". Subsequently, Nathan Brook's Army List of 1684 referred to "Coated red, lined with a flesh colour". This marked the beginning of the historic association of the regiment with buff facings (a dull-yellow colour). A notice in the London Gazette of 21 January 1685 describing the clothing of three deserters from what was still the Holland Regiment, referred for the first time to the colour buff:"a new Red Coat lin'd with a Buff colour'd lining, surtout Sleeves, cross Pockets with three scallops, large plain pewter Buttons, Breeches of the same colour as the Coat lining".

An illustration of the colonel's colour in 1707 shows a dragon on a buff background, following the award of this distinctive symbol to the regiment as "a reward for its gallant conduct on all occasions"; according to the Army historian Richard Cannon in a book published in 1839. The dragon was believed to have been adopted as it was one of the supporters of the royal arms of Elizabeth I, who issued the warrant for the raising of the regiment in 1572. Through the remainder of the 18th century both the dragon and the buff facings (worn on cuffs, lapels and coat linings) remained as particular distinctions of the regiment. A Royal Warrant of 1751 standardising all colours (flags), badges and uniforms listed the "3rd Regiment, or The Buffs". The Buffs were at this time the only infantry regiment to owe their official title to their facing colours. The green dragon was recorded in the same document as the "ancient badge" of the Buffs – displayed as a woven or painted device on the mitre cap of the Regiment's grenadiers, the colours and the drums.

In 1881, the reorganisation of most infantry regiments on a territorial basis under the Childers Reforms led to the newly renamed "The Buffs (East Kent Regiment)" losing its buff facings in favour of the white collars and cuffs intended to distinguish all non-Royal English and Welsh regiments. The dragon survived as part of the (now metal) headdress badge, although replaced on collars by the white horse of Kent. The horse had been the insignia of the East Kent Militia, which formed the 3rd battalion of the new regiment. Both changes were unpopular within the regiment, and in 1887 the Buffs were authorised to convert the white facings on their scarlet tunics to buff – at the regiment's expense and using a pipeclay mixture developed by an officer of the 2nd Battalion. In 1890 buff was officially restored as the regimental colour on flags, tunics and mess jackets. On 23 May 1894 approval was given for the dragon to be resumed as the collar badge.

For the rest of its existence as a separate entity, both dragon badge and buff facings remained as primary distinctions of the regiment. This was the case even on the simplified dark blue "No. 1 Dress" worn by most of the British Army as full dress after World War II, although the buff colour was here reduced to piping edging the shoulder straps.

== Alliances ==
- Canada – The Queen's Own Rifles of Canada (1914–1935), (1935–1961)

== See also ==
- Military history of the United Kingdom

== Sources ==
- Beckett, Ian (2003). Discovering English County Regiments. Shire. ISBN 978-0747-805069.
- Cannon, Richard (1839). Historical Records of the Third Regiment of Foot or the Buffs formerly designated the Holland Regiment containing an account of its original in the reign of Queen Elizabeth and of its subsequent services to 1838. CIHM/ICMH Collection de Microfiches; no. 48340. Longman, Orme & Company and William Clowes & Sons. ISBN 9780665483400.
- J.B.M. Frederick, Lineage Book of British Land Forces 1660–1978, Vol I, Wakefield: Microform Academic, 1984, ISBN 1-85117-007-3.
- Joslen, Lt-Col H.F. (2003). Orders of Battle, United Kingdom and Colonial Formations and Units in the Second World War, 1939–1945. Uckfield: Naval & Military. ISBN 1843424746.
- Knight, Captain H. R. (1935). Historical records of The Buffs, East Kent Regiment, 3rd Foot, formerly designated the Holland Regiment and Prince George of Denmark's Regiment 1572-1704. Vol. 1. Gale & Pollen.
- Moody, Richard (1923). The Historical Records of The Buffs (East Kent Regiment), 3rd Foot, 1914–1919.
- Perrett, Bryan (1998). At All Costs: Stories of Impossible Victories. Cassell Military Classics. ISBN 978-0304350544.
