= The Private of the Buffs =

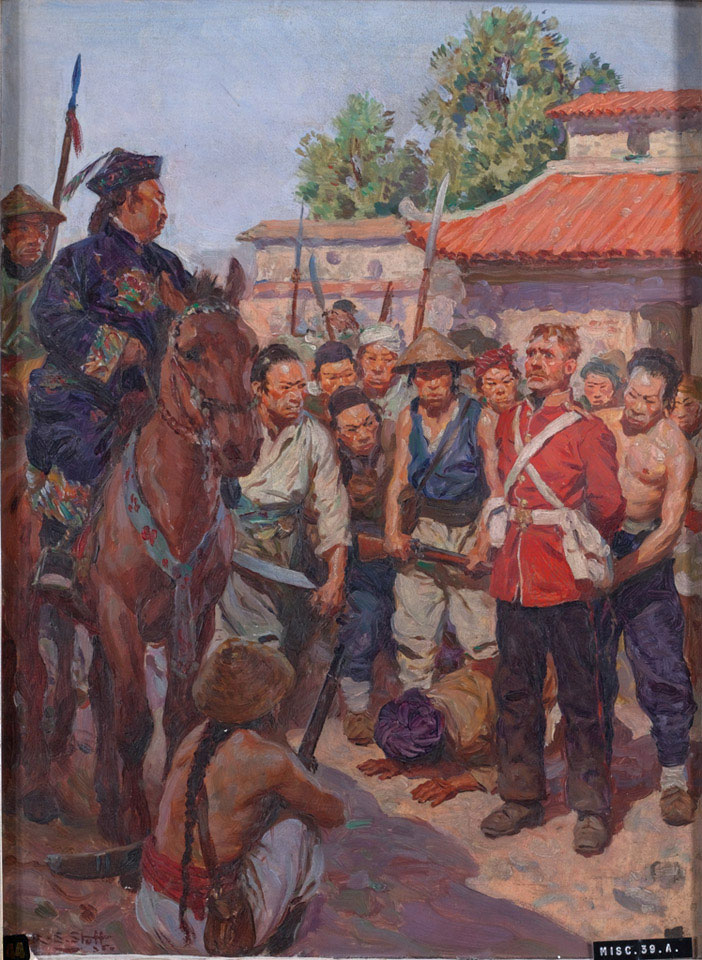
Private John Moyse, The 3rd (East Kent, The Buffs) Regiment of Foot, refusing to kow-tow before the Tartar Mandarin Tsan-koo-lin-sin, 1860

The Private of the Buffs (or The British Soldier In China) is a ballad by Sir Francis Hastings Doyle describing the execution of a British infantryman by Chinese soldiers in 1860.

== Background ==
During the Second Opium War, an Anglo-French expedition landed in China and marched towards Peking in order to force the compliance of the Treaty of Tientsin. On 13 August 1860, during the attack on the Taku Forts—大沽炮台, in Chinese, or dàgū pàotái—Chinese troops captured two British soldiers and a group of coolies. (Some contemporary accounts record the latter as Sikh soldiers from India, and indeed the poem refers to "dusky Indians.")

The details of the subsequent events are not well-recorded, but according to reports in The Times, one Private John Moyse, of the 3rd (East Kent) Regiment (commonly known as "the Buffs") refused to kowtow to his captors. Apparently he had "declared he would not prostrate himself before any Chinaman alive," and as a result, he was summarily executed. The poem refers to Moyse as a young Kentish farmboy; however it is unknown for certain. However, the poem was written on the strength of newspaper reports, and it is likely that Doyle was unaware of the discrepancies.

== The historical sources ==
Despite the report in The Times, there is speculation concerning whether the incident took place as was popularly supposed. Garnet Wolseley, who was present at the taking of the Taku forts, insisted that "The man belonging to the Buffs was either killed, or 'died of drink,' as the Chinese say." The source of the information—a soldier in the 44th (East Essex) Regiment of Foot was, according to Wolseley, not reliable. "His mind, indeed, seemed to be unbalanced, as in addition to the untruths he told, he talked utter nonsense about what he pretended he had overheard his captors say."

D.F. Rennie, a doctor with the British troops, also denied that the incident took place. The Manchester Times reprinted Rennie's account on December 2, 1865, with the conclusion

Thus, it would seem that this unfortunate man, who, through the romancing propensities of his comrade of the 44th, and the ready ear for 'sensationalism of the Times correspondent, was believed by the deluded British public to have been decapitated because he would not kow-tow to Sang-ko-lin-sin, died without ever seeing that personage at all."

== See also ==
Works related to The Private of the Buffs at Wikisource
