= John Moyse =

Legendary British soldier during the second opium war

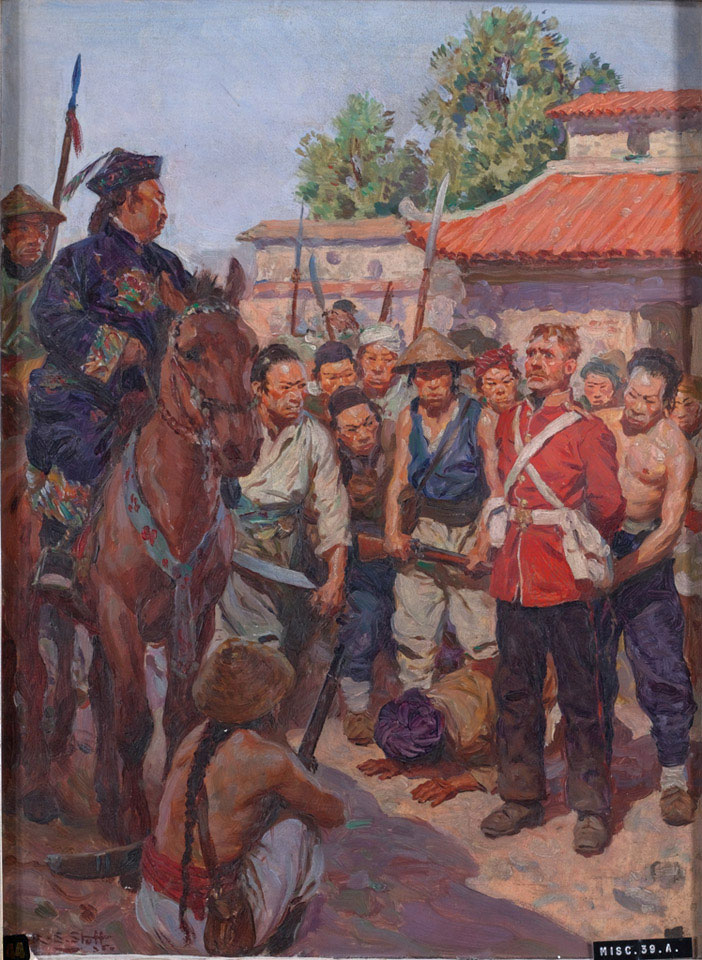
Private John Moyse, The 3rd (East Kent, The Buffs) Regiment of Foot, refusing to kow-tow before the Tartar Mandarin Tsan-koo-lin-sin, 1860

Private John Moyse was a British soldier of the 3rd (East Kent) Regiment who according to popular legend was captured by Chinese soldiers during the Second Opium War and later was executed for refusing to prostrate himself before the Chinese general. This alleged act of defiance was later immortalised in The Private of the Buffs, a poem by Sir Francis Hastings Doyle.

== Historical background ==
The Second Opium War (1856–1860) was fought to guarantee European sovereignty of the seas after a Chinese-owned and British-registered ship, The Arrow, was seized in 1856 for being involved in smuggling and piracy. Since it had been flying the British Ensign, the British government pressed for an apology. They allied with France and Russia and invaded China from 1857 to 1858. In 1858, China sued for peace and agreed to the Treaty of Tientsin, which allowed the creation of French and English embassies in Beijing, and the Treaty of Aigun, which redrew Russia's border with China.

In 1859, after China repudiated the Treaty of Tientsin, the war continued. A naval force under the command of Admiral Sir James Hope shelled the forts guarding the mouth of the Peiho river. It was damaged and withdrew under the cover of fire from a naval squadron commanded by Commodore Josiah Tattnall.

In 1860, an Anglo-French army gathered at Hong Kong and then carried out a landing at Pei Tang on 3 August, and a successful assault on the Taku Forts on 21 August. On the march to Beijing the Anglo-French forces pushed aside several Manchu military units but the fighting was limited.

== "The Private of the Buffs" ==
On 13 August 1860 during the march on the Taku Forts, a party of Sikh sappers and some laborers transporting their column's rum rations were captured by a force of Tartar cavalry. Among them was Private John Moyse of the 3rd (East Kent) Regiment, also known as "The Buffs", and an unnamed sergeant of the 44th (East Essex) Regiment.

The next day the prisoners were brought before a local mandarin and were ordered to kow-tow, under penalty of torture or execution if they did not comply. Private Moyse alone refused and was savagely beaten and then beheaded, his body afterwards thrown on a dungheap. He was his regiment's only casualty in the fighting.

The cause of his refusal has been a subject of much dispute. The popular story was that it was on the grounds that it would disgrace his country. However, it has been surmised that Moyse, who had a history of insubordination, refused out of personal pride and stubbornness. When the prisoners were released a week later, their tale of Moyse's bravery spread through the army.

His act of defiance was later celebrated in The Private of the Buffs, a poem by Sir Francis Hastings Doyle. The poem refers to Moyse as a newly recruited young Kentish farm boy. His origin is not known for certain, however. The poem was written on the strength of newspaper reports, and it is likely that Doyle was unaware of the discrepancies.

== The historical sources ==
Despite the report in The Times, there is some question as to whether the incident took place as popularly supposed. Garnet Wolseley, who was present at the taking of the Taku forts, insists that "The man belonging to the Buffs was either killed, or 'died of drink,' as the Chinese say." The source of the information—a soldier in the 44th Regiment—was, according to Wolseley, not reliable. "His mind, indeed, seemed to be unbalanced, as in addition to the untruths he told, he talked utter nonsense about what he pretended he had overheard his captors say."

D.F. Rennie, a doctor with the British troops, also denies that the incident took place. The Manchester Times reprinted Rennie's account on 2 December 1865, with the conclusion

Thus, it would seem that this unfortunate man, who, through the romancing propensities of his comrade of the 44th, and the ready ear for 'sensationalism of the Times correspondent, was believed by the deluded British public to have been decapitated because he would not kow-tow to Sang-ko-lin-sin, died without ever seeing that personage at all."

== See also ==
- Works related to The Private of the Buffs at Wikisource
