= Ernest Stafford Carlos =

English painter

- Born: 4 June 1883; North Brixton, South London, England
- Died: 14 June 1917 (aged 34); Zillebeke, Flanders, Belgium
- Education: Lambeth School of Art; Royal Academy Schools
- Known for: Painting, portraiture

Ernest Stafford Carlos (4 June 1883 – 14 June 1917) was a British painter and war artist. He is best known for his works depicting the early days of the Scout Movement. He joined the British Army and was killed during the First World War.

== Early life and education ==
Born on 4 June 1883, in North Brixton, Ernest was the son of John Gregory Carlos and Anne Chessell (née Buckler). He was educated at St John the Divine School in Kennington and the Lambeth School of Art, gaining a scholarship to study at the Royal Academy Schools in 1901. He had a painting displayed at the Royal Academy summer exhibition when he was seventeen years of age and had a further thirteen works displayed in later summer exhibitions during his career, the last being in 1915.

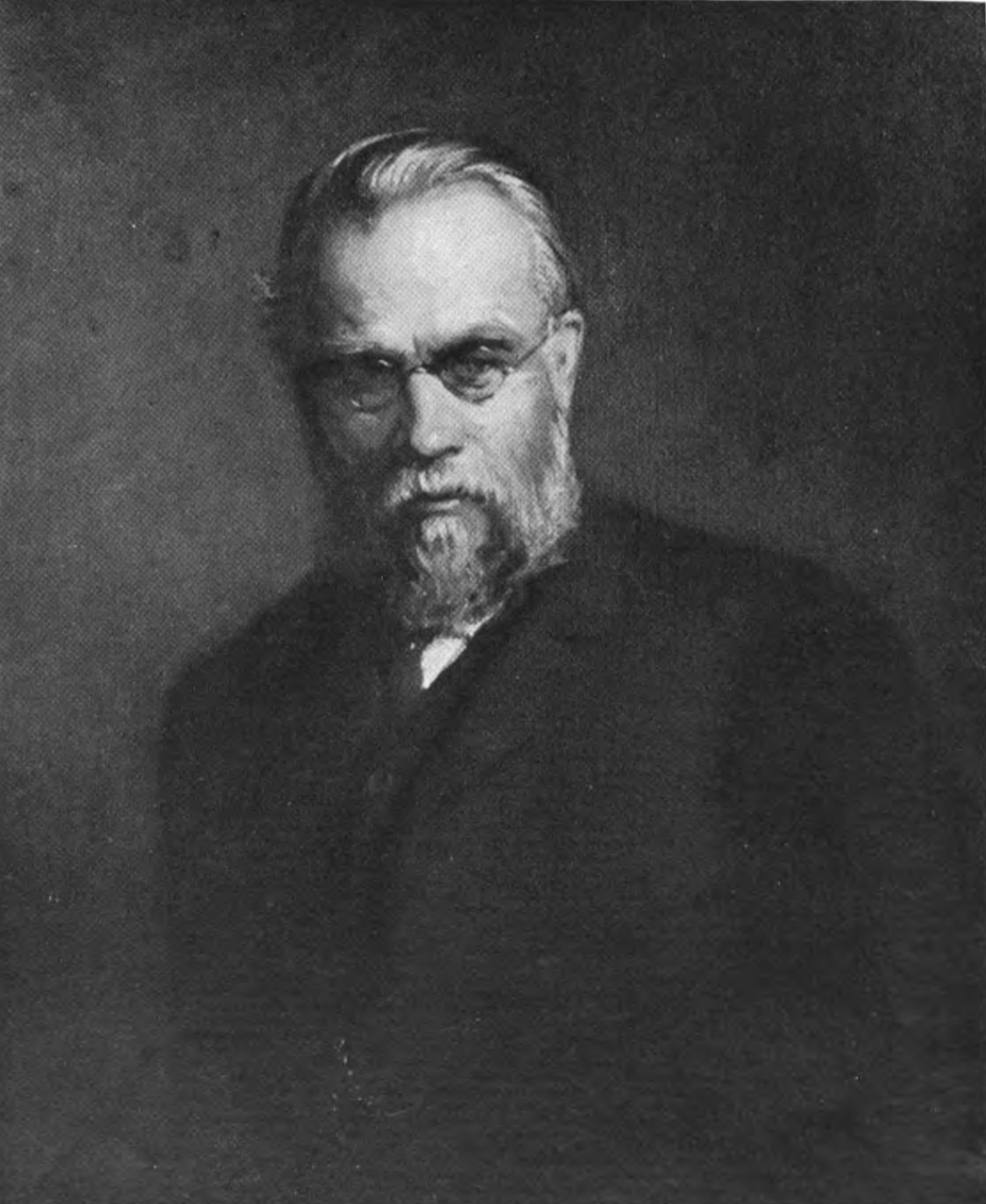
Carlos's 1913 portrait of trade unionist Frederick Rogers.

== Career in portraiture ==
Around 1904, Carlos set up a studio in the family home at Foxley Road, north Brixton, from where he built up a business painting and copying portraits, often of senior clergymen. During his time in Brixton, he became interested in efforts to improve the conditions of the urban poor. His painting of an unemployed man, Rejected and Dejected (1908), was exhibited at the Royal Academy and reproduced by the Independent Labour Party in some of their election material.

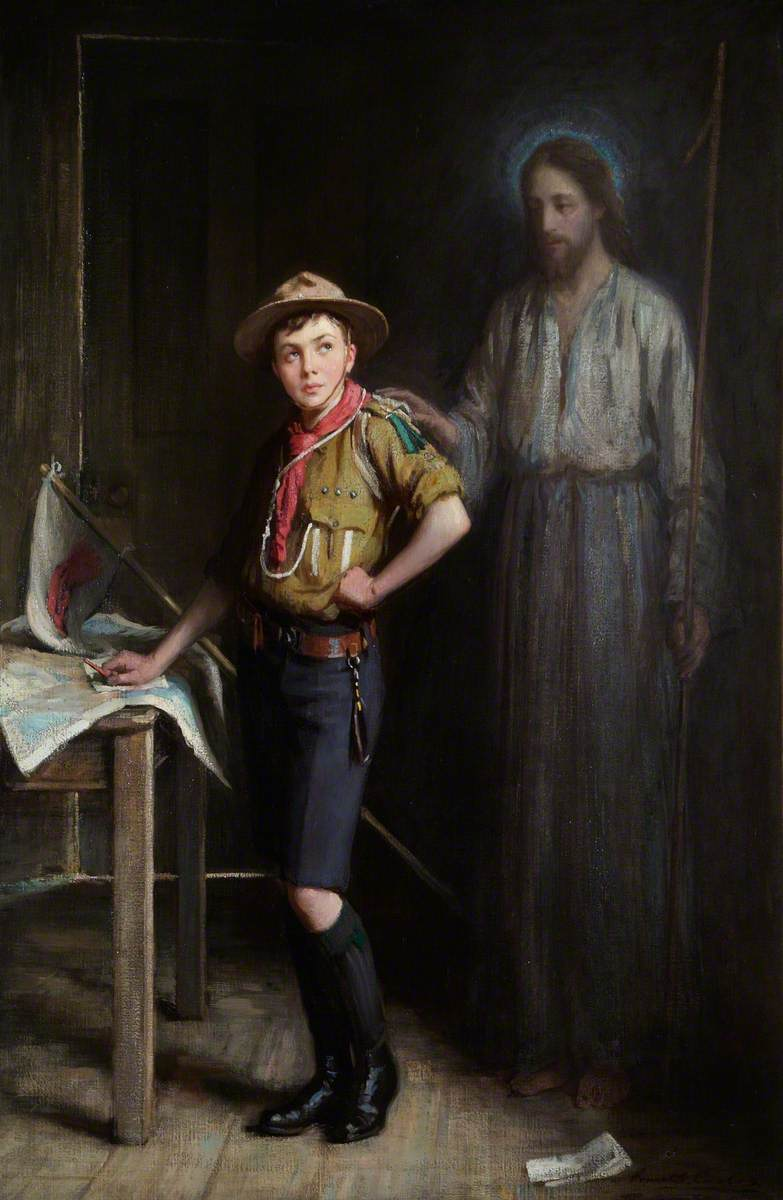
The Pathfinder (1913), the best known of Carlos's Scouting paintings.

== Scouting ==
Soon after the launch of Robert Baden-Powell's Boy Scout scheme in 1908, Carlos founded the 107th London Scout Troop, now the 21st Camberwell (Trinity) Scout Group. He painted a number of pictures of Scouts between 1910 and 1915, which helped to bring the ethos of Scouting to a wider public. Titles included A Ripping Yarn (1910), If I Were a Boy Again (1911) and Good Service Work in a London Slum (1913). Perhaps the best known is The Pathfinder (1913) which shows a young Scout with the hand of Jesus Christ on his shoulder. It was widely circulated as a print, and a copy has featured on the set of the television soap opera, Coronation Street since 1961. One of two original versions of The Pathfinder, together with a number of Carlos's other Scouting works, are held at Gilwell Park in Essex, the headquarters of The Scout Association.

== Military service and death ==
At the outbreak of the First World War in 1914, Carlos volunteered for the Army, but was rejected on health grounds. He succeeded in his second application and became a private in the Queen's Westminster Rifles, but was commissioned into the 8th Battalion, The Buffs (East Kent Regiment) as a Lieutenant in 1916. Arriving in the Artois sector of the Western Front early in 1917, Carlos filled several notebooks with pen and watercolour sketches of life in and behind the trenches. At the end of May, his division began the move towards Ypres in preparation for an offensive, during which time he completed some twenty paintings with titles like On the Track of the Hun, Fires Burning at Ypres and Three Officers Playing Cards at Poperinghe. He was killed in action during the Battle of Messines on 14 or 15 June 1917 while his unit was assaulting a German held spoil heap near Zillebeke in Flanders, a feature that became known as "Buff's Bank".

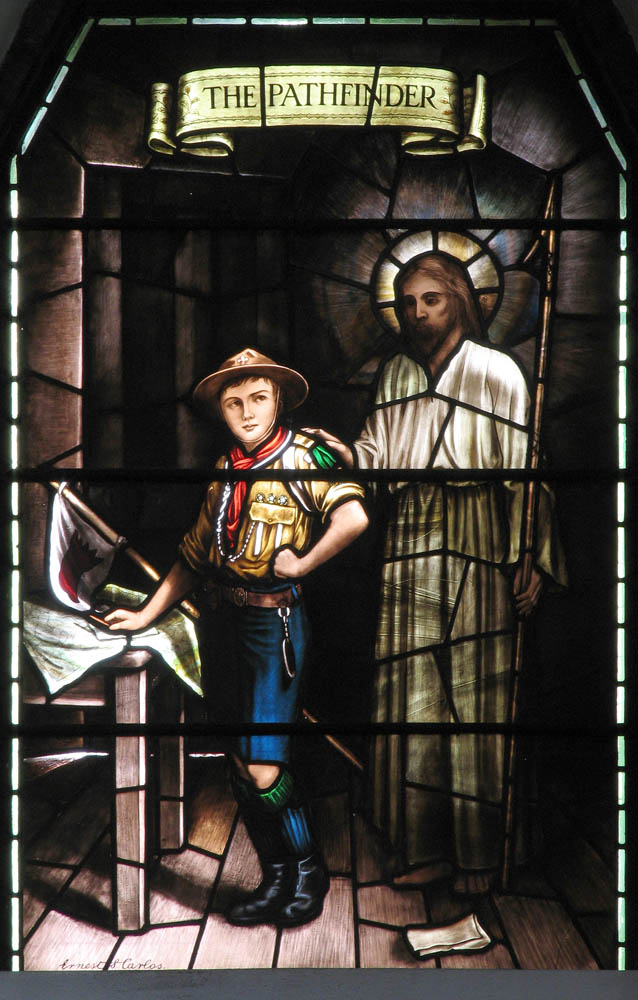
The memorial stained glass window to Carlos at Holy Cross Church, Hornchurch, inspired by The Pathfinder.

He is buried close to the battlefield at Chester Farm Commonwealth War Graves Commission Cemetery. His family's memorial to him is a window depicting The Pathfinder in stained glass at Holy Cross Church, Hornchurch.

Several other churches across Britain have a Pathfinder stained glass window, as does one in Canada. In Greater Manchester, a Pathfinder window which was made for a Scout headquarters in 1924 as a war memorial was threatened when the building was sold; in 2007 a public appeal raised £21,000 to have the window installed in Saint Gabriel's Church, Middleton.
