= North Brixton =

North Brixton is a locality in the London Borough of Lambeth in South London, formerly in Surrey. It is known for its night life and its arts scene.

== Notable people associated with North Brixton ==
- Ernest Stafford Carlos (1883-1917), painter and war artist
- Charles Roger Dod (1793-1855), writer of parliamentary and genealogical works
- Thomas Gaspey (1788-1871), writer
