= William Richard Cotter =

William Richard Cotter VC
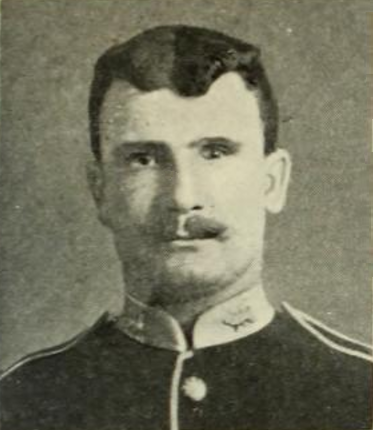
- Born: March 1882; Folkestone, Kent
- Died: 14 March 1916 (aged 34); Lillers Hospital, France
- Burial place: Lillers Communal Cemetery
- Military career
- Allegiance: United Kingdom
- Branch: British Army
- Service years: – 1916
- Rank: Acting Corporal
- Units: The Buffs (East Kent Regiment)
- Conflicts: World War I: Second attack on the Hohenzollern Redoubt (DOW)
- Awards: Victoria Cross

William Richard Cotter VC (March 1882 – 14 March 1916) was an English recipient of the Victoria Cross, the highest and most prestigious award for gallantry in the face of the enemy that can be awarded to British and Commonwealth forces.

Cotter was born in Folkestone, Kent in 1882 the son of Richard and Amy Cotter, his father who had been born in Ireland was described in the 1891 census of Elham as a plasterer's labourer.

He was 33 years old, and an Acting Corporal in the 6th Battalion, The Buffs (East Kent Regiment), British Army during the First World War when the following deed took place for which he was awarded the VC.

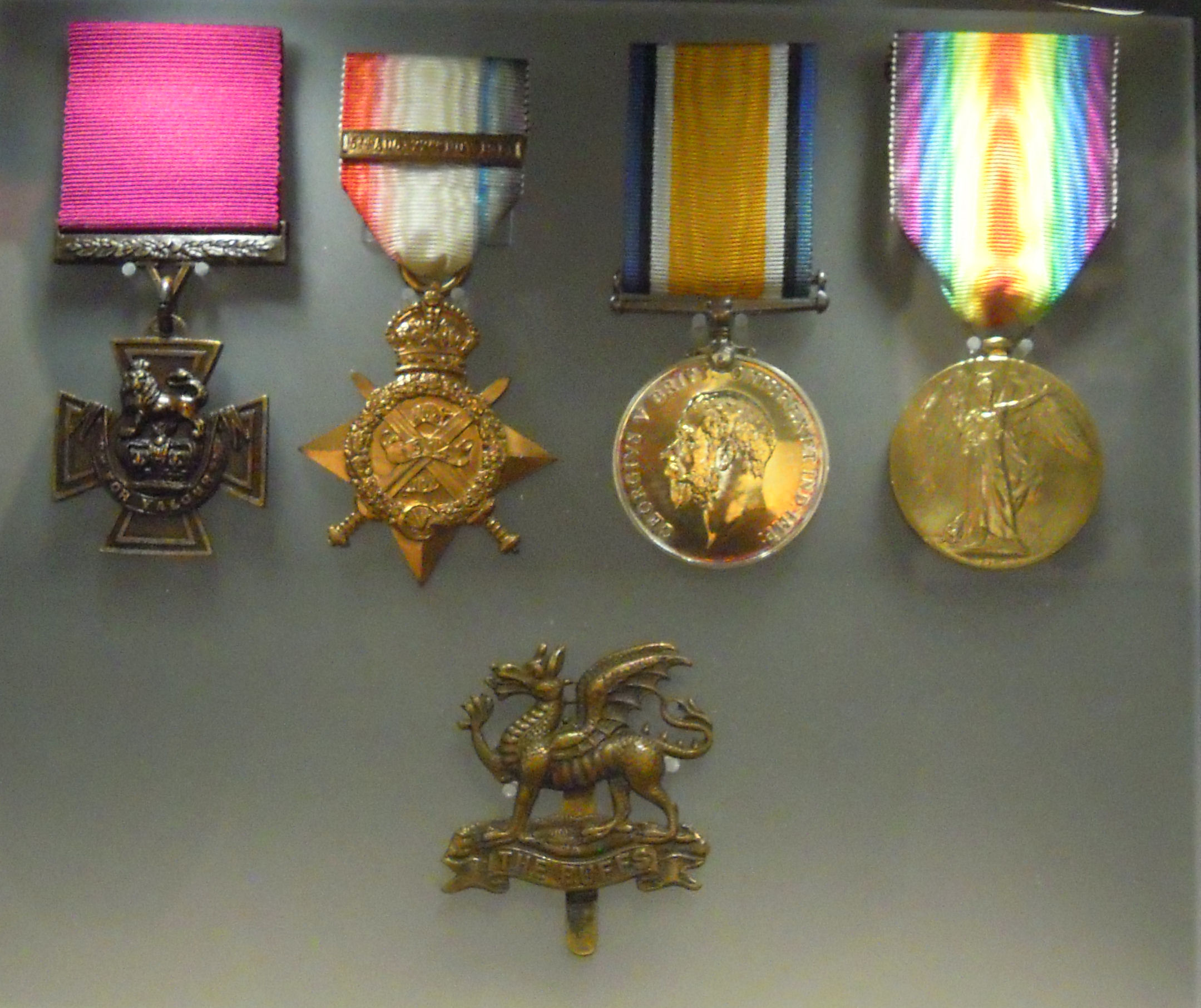
Cotter's medals and cap badge displayed in the National Army Museum

On 6 March 1916 near Hohenzollern Redoubt, France, Corporal Cotter's leg was blown off at the knee and he was also wounded in both arms. He nevertheless made his way unaided for 50 yards to a crater, steadied the men who were holding it, controlled their fire, issued orders and altered their dispositions to meet a fresh counter-attack. For two hours he held his position and only allowed his wounds to be roughly dressed when the attack had quietened down. He could not be moved back for 14 hours and during all this time he had a cheery word for everyone.

He was buried at Lillers Communal Cemetery, France which is 7 miles (11 km) north west of Bethune. Plot IV. Row E. Grave 45.

His Victoria Cross was on display at The Buffs Regimental Museum, Canterbury, England. With the rest of that museum's collections, it has now been transferred to the National Army Museum, where it is now displayed.

The Amazing Brewery Co. based at the Ship Inn in Sandgate, Folkestone, brews a classic bitter – Amazing Cotter VC – in his honour.

== Publications ==
- Monuments to Courage (David Harvey, 1999)
- The Register of the Victoria Cross (This England, 1997)
