= Chester Farm Cemetery =

WWI CWGC cemetery in Ypres, Belgium

Chester Farm
- Commonwealth War Graves Commission
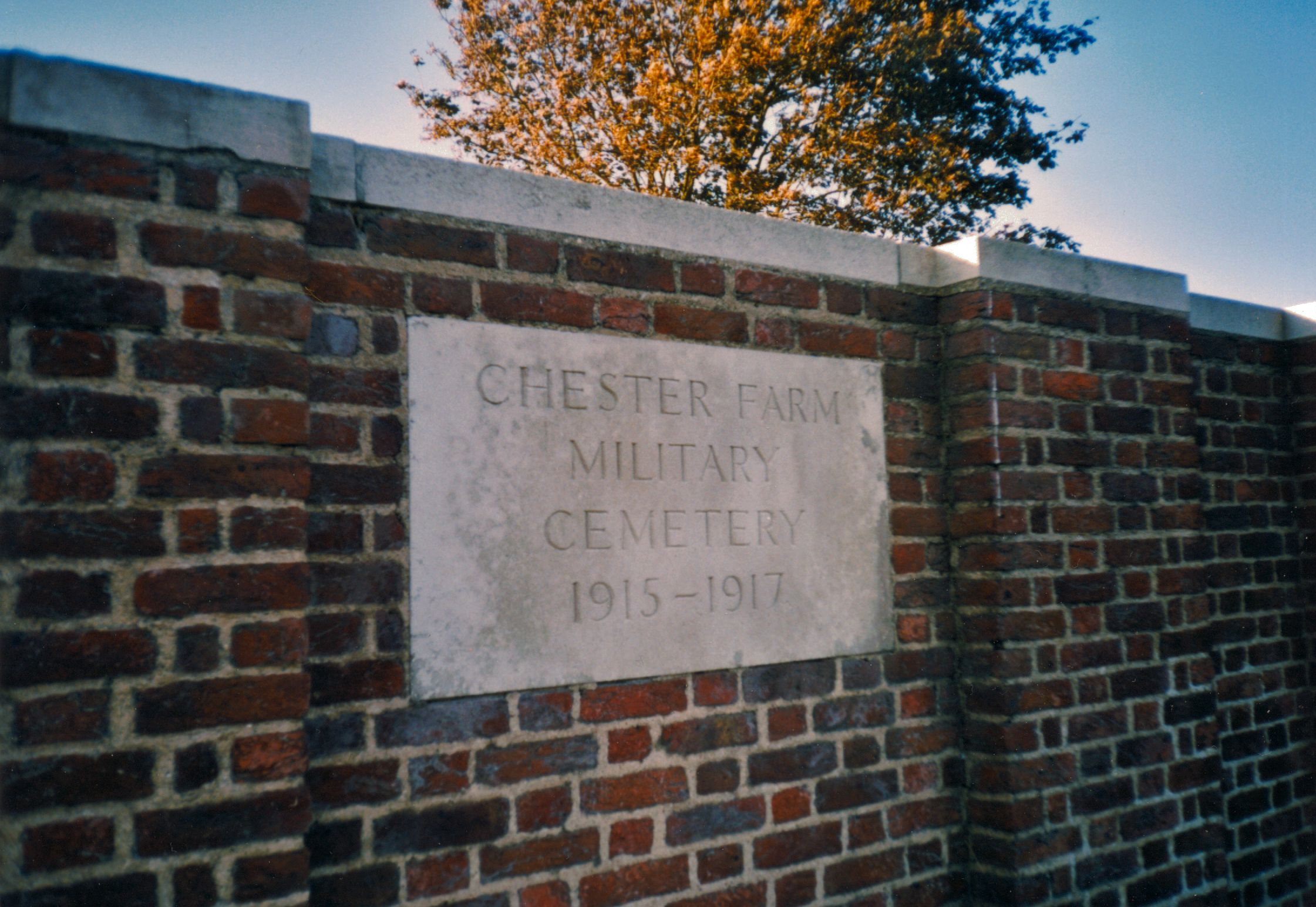
- Used for those deceased 1915–1917
- Established: March 1915
- Location: 50°49′18″N 2°54′04″E near Ypres, West Flanders, Belgium
- Designed by: Sir Edwin Lutyens
- Total burials: 424
- Unknowns: 9

Burials by nation
- Allied Powers: United Kingdom: 311; Canada: 88; Australia: 21; Central Powers: Germany: 4

Burials by war
- World War I: 424
- Statistics source: wo1.be and firstworldwar.com

Chester Farm is a Commonwealth War Graves Commission burial ground for the dead of the First World War located in the Ypres Salient on the Western Front.

The cemetery grounds were assigned to the United Kingdom in perpetuity by the King of Belgium in recognition of the sacrifices made by the British Empire in the defence and liberation of Belgium during the war.

== Foundation ==
Commonwealth troops began using the site as a cemetery in March 1915. The cemetery is named after a nearby farm, which was itself probably named by the 2nd Battalion of the Cheshire Regiment in 1915.

The dead are mostly grouped by battalion.

There are cenotaphs for six soldiers (five British and one Canadian) who are known or believed to be buried in the cemetery but whose actual plot was lost or destroyed. These stones usually have the Rudyard Kipling-derived footnote "Their glory shall not be blotted out".

== Notable graves ==
The painter Ernest Stafford Carlos is buried here.

== Gallery ==
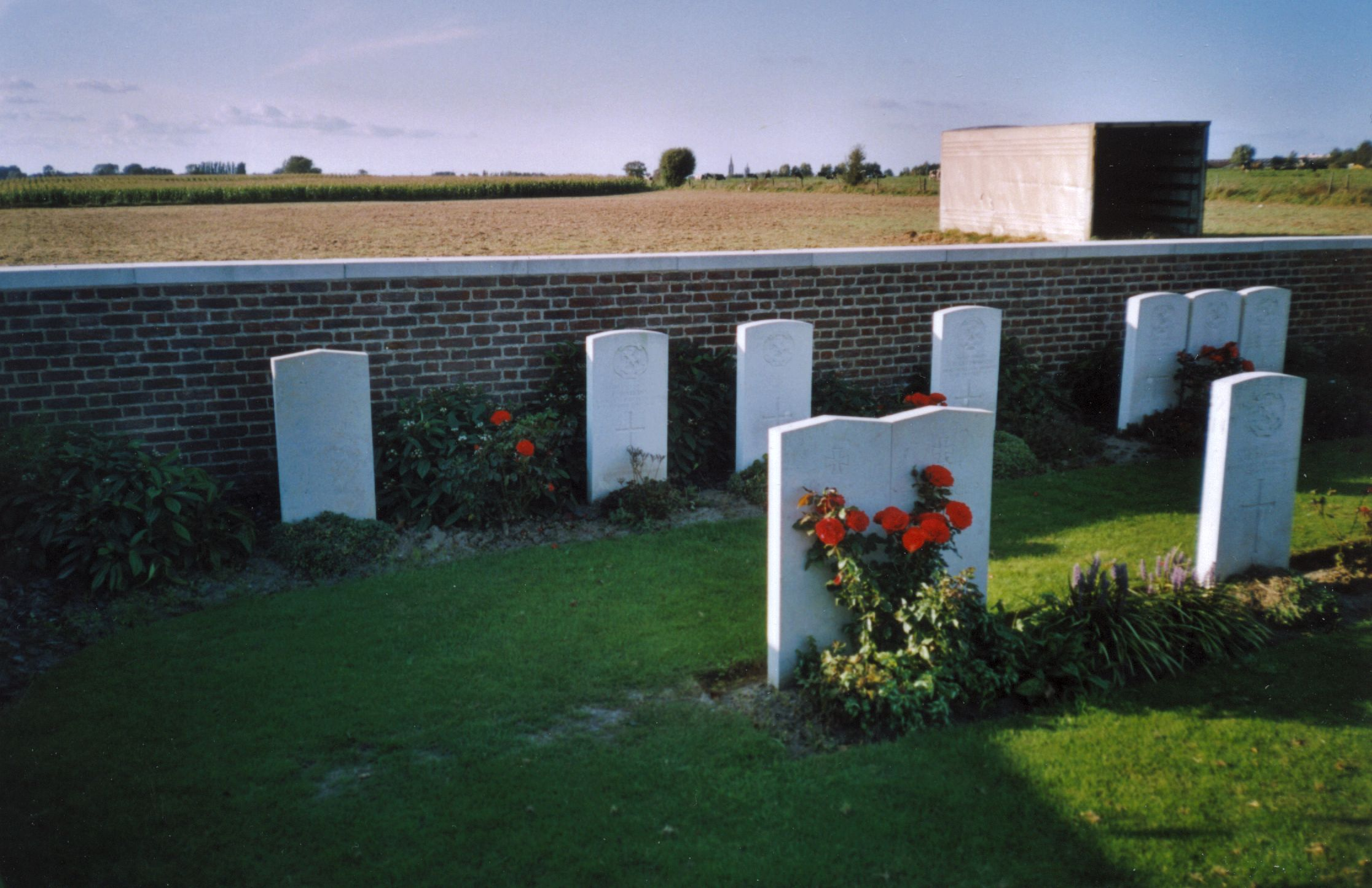
Gravestones at the rear of the cemetery, showing planting done by the CWGC.

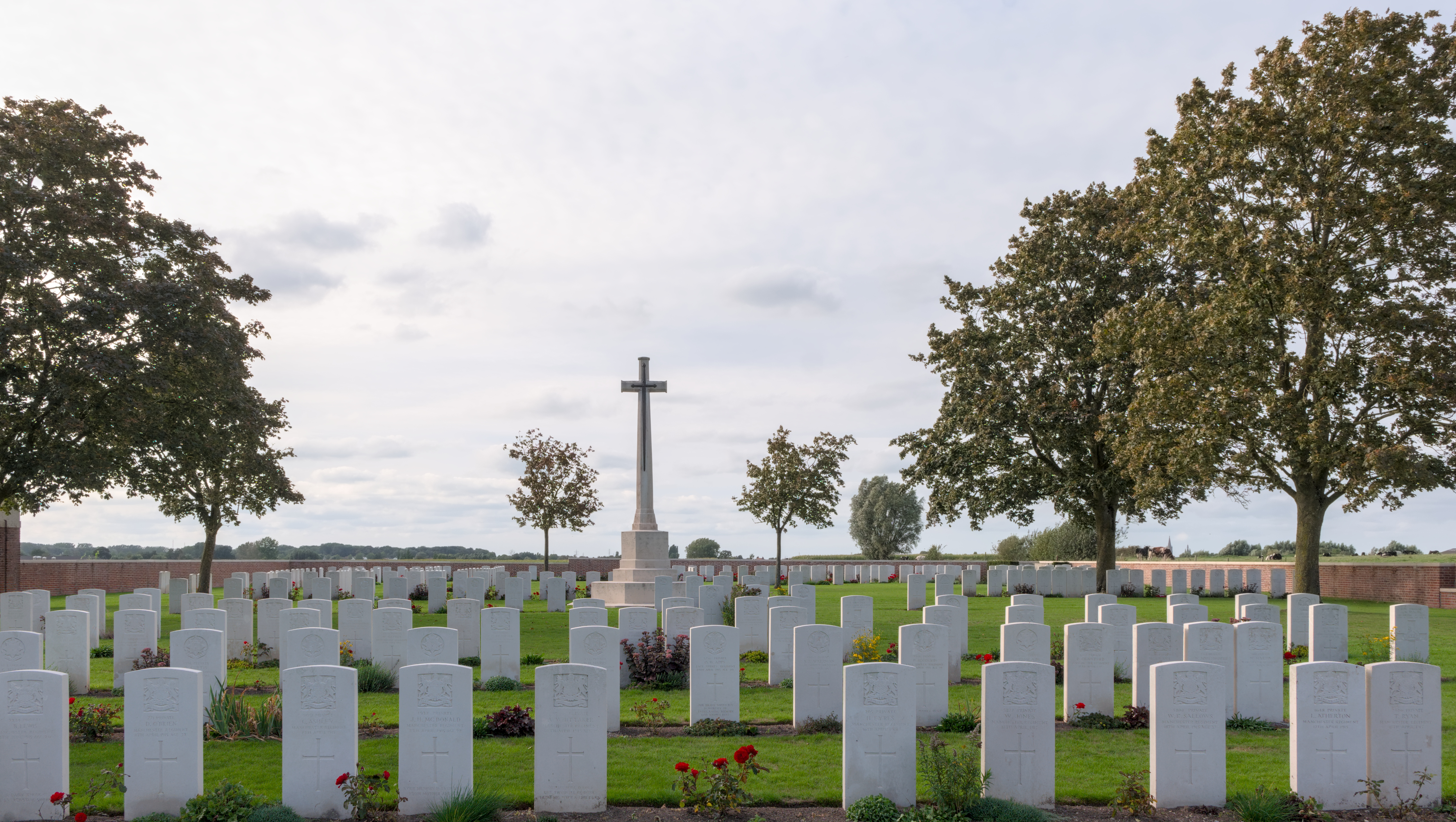
Overview from the entrance of the cemetery
