= Francis Hastings Doyle =

British academic and poet

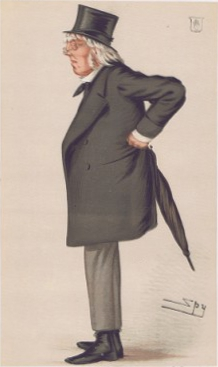
"Poetry" — Doyle as caricatured by Spy (Leslie Ward) in Vanity Fair, November 1877

Sir Francis Hastings Charles Doyle, 2nd Baronet (21 August 1810 – 8 June 1888) was a British poet.

== Biography ==
Doyle was born at Nunappleton near Tadcaster, Yorkshire, to a family which produced several army officers, including his father, Major-General Sir Francis Hastings Doyle, 1st Baronet, created a baronet in 1828. His mother was Diana Elizabeth Milner (died 1828), daughter of Sir William Milner, 3rd Baronet of Nunappleton. He succeeded to the baronetcy on the death of his father in 1839.

Doyle was educated at Eton College. He matriculated at Christ Church, Oxford in 1828, graduating B.A. in 1832 with a degree in classics. He was a Fellow of All Souls College from 1835 to 1845. Among his Oxford friends was William Gladstone, at whose marriage he was best man, but in later life their political opinions widely differed. Studying law from 1832, he was called to the Bar in 1837 at the Inner Temple, and went the Northern Circuit.

Later Doyle held fiscal appointments, becoming in 1846 receiver-general of Customs, a post he held to 1869. He moved in 1869 to commissioner of Customs, and held that position to 1883.

Doyle was elected in 1867 Professor of Poetry at Oxford. He held the post to 1877.

== Works ==
Doyle was known as a poet mostly for ballads including The Red Thread of Honour (translated into Pashto), The Private of the Buffs, and The Loss of the Birkenhead. He published:

- Miscellaneous Verses (1834)
- Two Destinies (1844)
- Oedipus, King of Thebes (1849)
- The Return of the Guards: And Other Poems (1866)
- Lectures on Poetry: Delivered at Oxford (Second Series) (1877). Includes Installation Ode, and other poems. In 1869 some of the first series lectures Doyle had delivered were published in book form. One was his appreciation of William Barnes. An essay on John Henry Newman's The Dream of Gerontius, from the second series, was translated into French.
- Robin Hood's Bay: An Ode Addressed to the English People (1878), anonymous
- Reminiscences and Opinions of Sir Francis Hastings Doyle, 1813-1885 (1886)

== Family ==
In 1844, Doyle married Sidney Williams-Wynn (died 1867), daughter of the MP Charles Williams-Wynn. The couple had three sons and two daughters:

- The eldest son Francis Granville Doyle (1846–1882), in the 2nd Dragoon Guards, died of typhoid fever after serving in the Anglo-Egyptian War.
- The second son Everard Hastings Doyle (1852–1933) succeeded to the baronetcy. He was Clerk of Committees at the House of Commons, and died unmarried.
- Arthur Havelock James Doyle succeeded as 4th Baronet.
- The elder daughter Mary Annabel (died 1924) married in 1885 Charles Carmichael Lacaita, MP and botanist.
- The younger daughter Sidney Annora died unmarried in 1873.

Baronetage of the United Kingdom
Preceded by Francis Hastings Doyle	Baronet (of Buscombe); 1839–1888	Succeeded by Everard Hastings Doyle
