= Kowtow =

Form of prostration as sign of respect

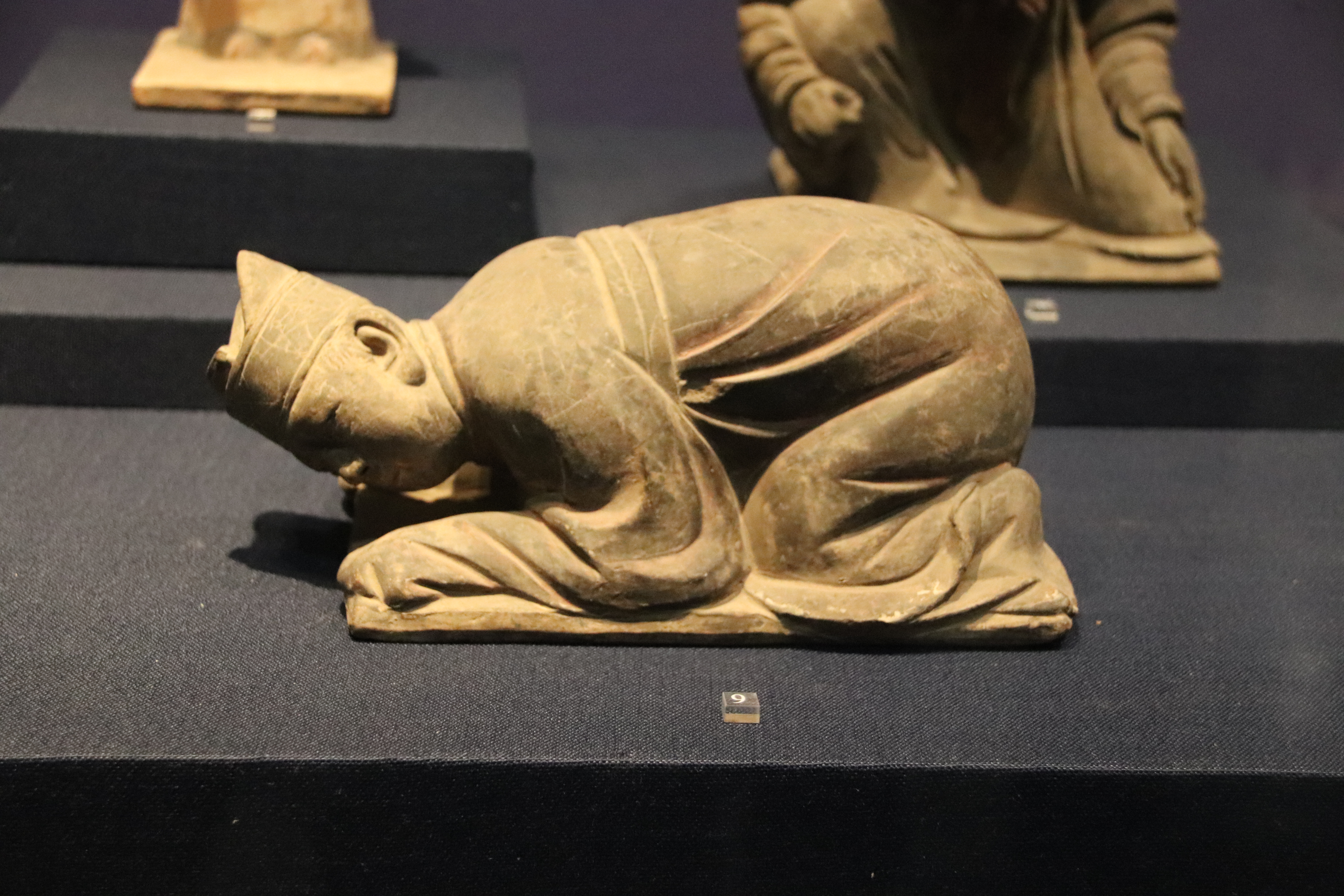
- Pottery figure of a kowtowing official, Song Dynasty, excavated from Feng County, now collection of Shaanxi History Museum

Chinese name
- Traditional Chinese: 叩頭
- Simplified Chinese: 叩头
- Literal meaning: knock head, touch head
Transcriptions
Standard Mandarin
- Hanyu Pinyin: kòutóu
- IPA: [kʰôʊ.tʰǒʊ]
Wu
- Romanization: (not used)
Hakka
- Pha̍k-fa-sṳ: khieu-thèu
Yue: Cantonese
- Jyutping: kau3 tau4
Southern Min
- Hokkien POJ: khàu-thâu

Alternative Chinese name
- Traditional Chinese: 磕頭
- Simplified Chinese: 磕头
Transcriptions
Standard Mandarin
- Hanyu Pinyin: kētóu
- IPA: [kʰɤ́.tʰǒʊ]
Wu
- Romanization: [kʰəʔdɤɯ]
Hakka
- Pha̍k-fa-sṳ: kha̍p-thèu (rare)
Yue: Cantonese
- Jyutping: hap6 tau4 (rare)
Southern Min
- Hokkien POJ: kha̍p-thâu

Vietnamese name
- Vietnamese: quỳ lạy rập đầu khấu đầu
- Hán-Nôm: 跪𥚄 立頭
- Chữ Hán: 叩頭

Korean name
- Hangul: 고두
- Hanja: 叩頭
Transcriptions
- Revised Romanization: godu

Japanese name
- Kanji: 叩頭 or 磕頭(noun); 叩頭く (verb)
- Hiragana: こうとう or かいとう (noun); ぬかずく or ぬかつく (verb) or ぬかづく (verb)
Transcriptions
- Romanization: kōtō or historical kaitō (noun); nukazuku or nukatsuku or nukadzuku (verb)

A kowtow (/ˈkaʊtaʊ/), also spelled kaotao (simplified Chinese: 叩头; traditional Chinese: 叩頭; Jyutping: kau3 tau4), is the act of deep respect shown by prostration, that is, kneeling and bowing so low as to have one's head touching the ground. It was commonly used in religious worship which emphasizes its emotional depth, sincerity, and willing submission. In Sinospheric culture, the kowtow is the highest sign of reverence. It was widely used to show reverence for one's elders, superiors, and especially the Emperor of China, as well as for religious and cultural objects of worship.

== Terminology ==
The word kowtow is derived from the Cantonese pronunciation of 叩頭/叩头 (Jyutping: kau3 tau4; pinyin: kòutóu). An alternative Chinese term is 磕頭/磕头 (Jyutping: hap6 tau4; pinyin: kētóu); however, the meaning is somewhat altered: 叩 has the general meaning of knock, whereas 磕 has the general meaning of "touch upon (a surface)", 頭/头 meaning head. The date of this custom's origin is probably sometime during the Spring and Autumn period or the Warring States period of China's history (771–221 BC), because it was a custom by the time of the Qin dynasty (221–206 BC).

== Traditional usage ==
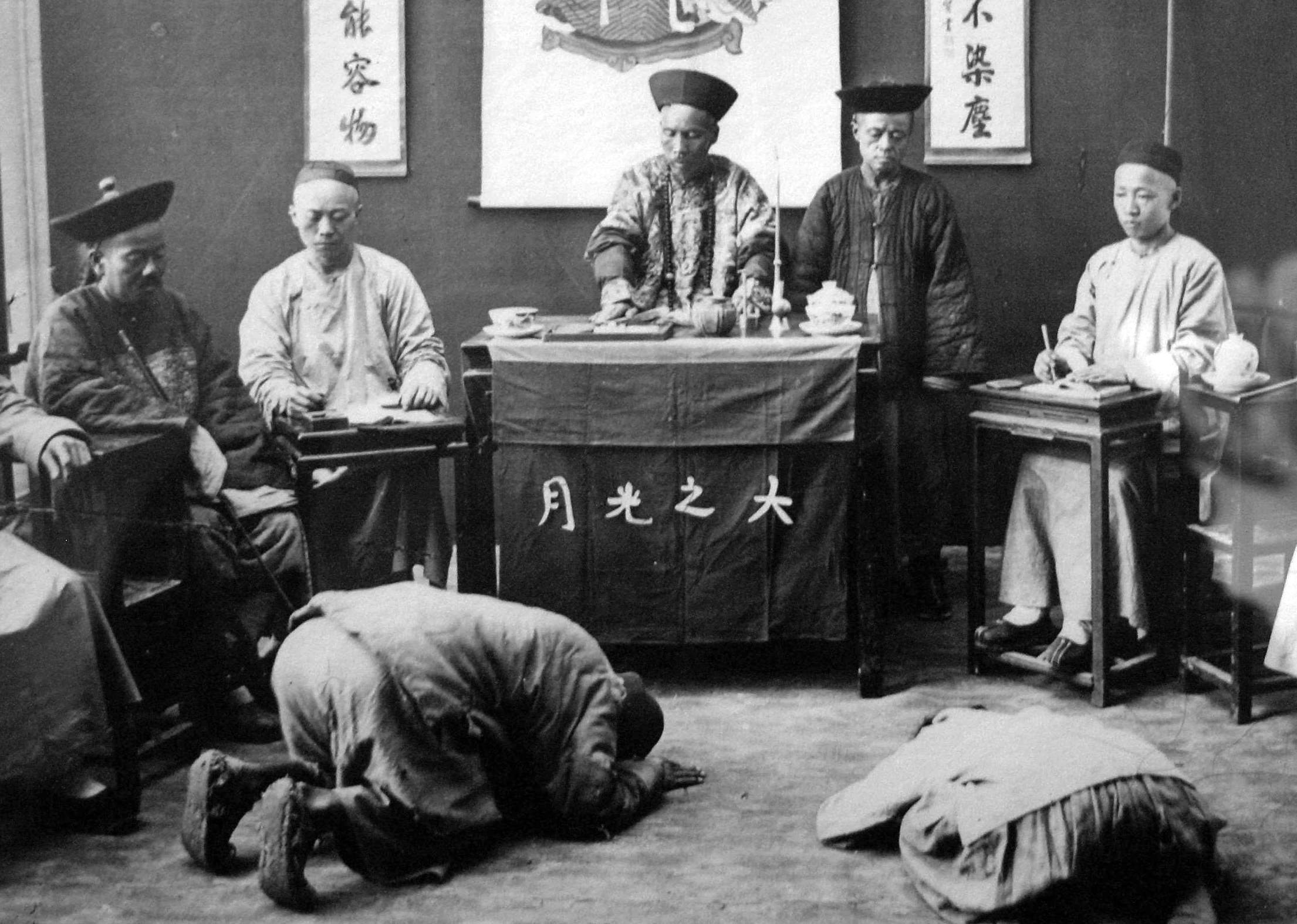
Staged photograph of a Kowtow being performed before a magistrate by William Saunders, c. 1865–72.

In Imperial Chinese protocol, the kowtow was performed before the Emperor of China. Depending on the situation's solemnity, different kowtow grades would be used. In the most solemn of ceremonies, for example, at the coronation of a new Emperor, the Emperor's subjects would undertake the ceremony of the "three kneelings and nine kowtows", the so-called grand kowtow, which involves kneeling from a standing position three times, and each time, performing the kowtow three times while kneeling. Immanuel Hsu describes the "full kowtow" as "three kneelings and nine knockings of the head on the ground".

As government officials represented the majesty of the Emperor while carrying out their duties, commoners were required to kowtow to them in formal situations. For example, a commoner brought before a local magistrate must kneel and kowtow. A commoner was required to remain kneeling, whereas a person who had earned a degree in the Imperial examinations was permitted a seat.

Since one is required by Confucian philosophy to show great reverence to one's parents and grandparents, children may be required to kowtow to their elderly ancestors, particularly on special occasions. For example, at a wedding, the marrying couple was traditionally required to kowtow to both sets of parents, as acknowledgement of the debt owed for their nurturing.

Confucius believed there was a natural harmony between the body and mind and therefore, whatever actions were expressed through the body would be transferred over to the mind. Because the body is placed in a low position in the kowtow, the idea is that one will naturally convert to his or her mind a feeling of respect. What one does to oneself influences the mind. Confucian philosophy held that respect was important for a society, making bowing an important ritual.

== Modern Chinese usage ==
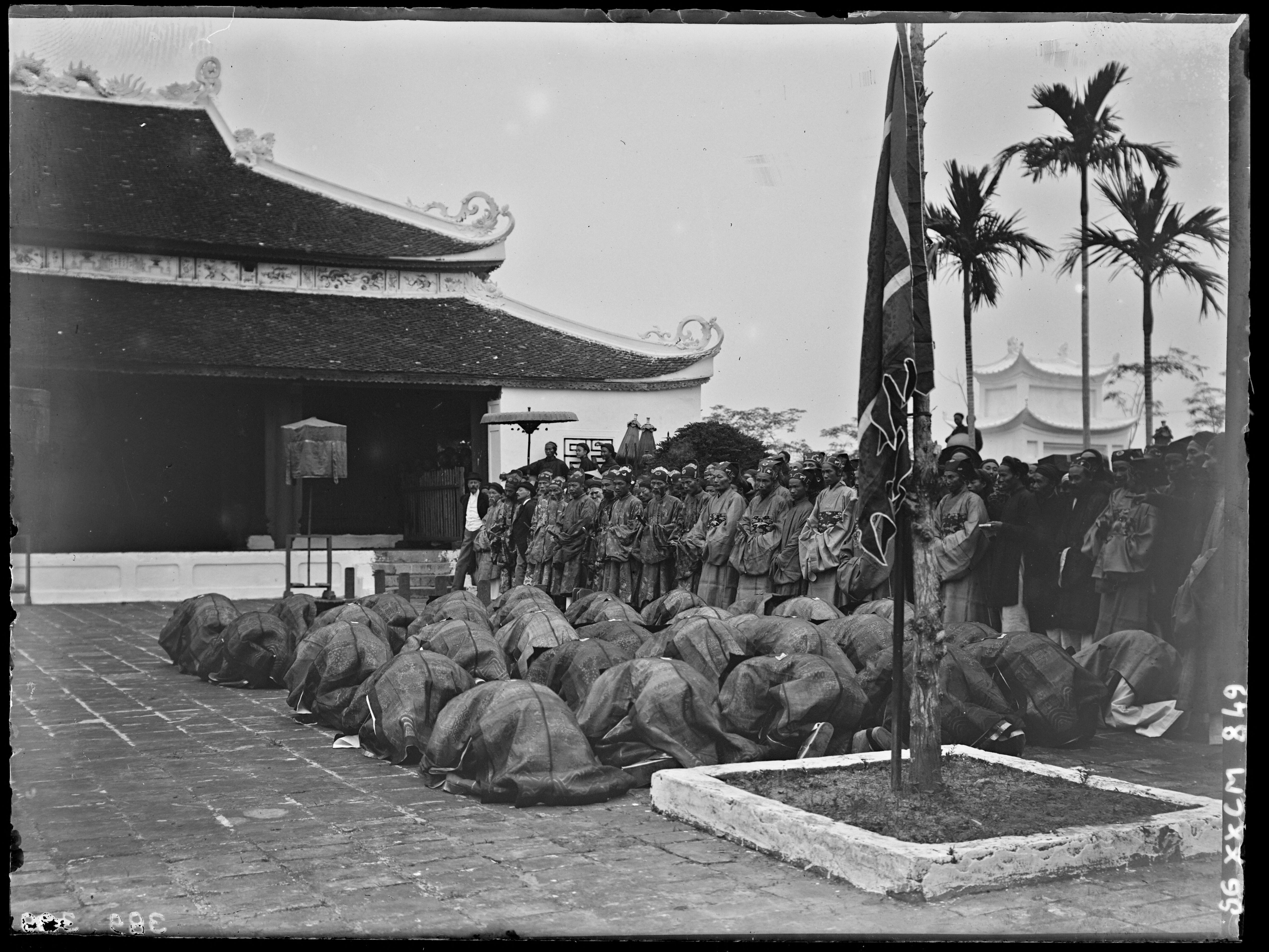
Vietnamese laureates of the triennial Confucian exam kowtow towards the shrine in Nam Định, 1897

The kowtow, and other traditional forms of reverence, were much maligned after the May Fourth Movement. Today, only vestiges of the traditional usage of the kowtow remain. In many situations, the standing bow has replaced the kowtow. For example, some, but not all, people would choose to kowtow before the grave of an ancestor, or while making traditional offerings to an ancestor. Direct descendants may kowtow at the funeral of an ancestor, while others would simply bow. During a wedding, some couples may kowtow to their respective parents, though the standing bow is today more common. In extreme cases, the kowtow can be used to express profound gratitude, apology, or to beg for forgiveness.

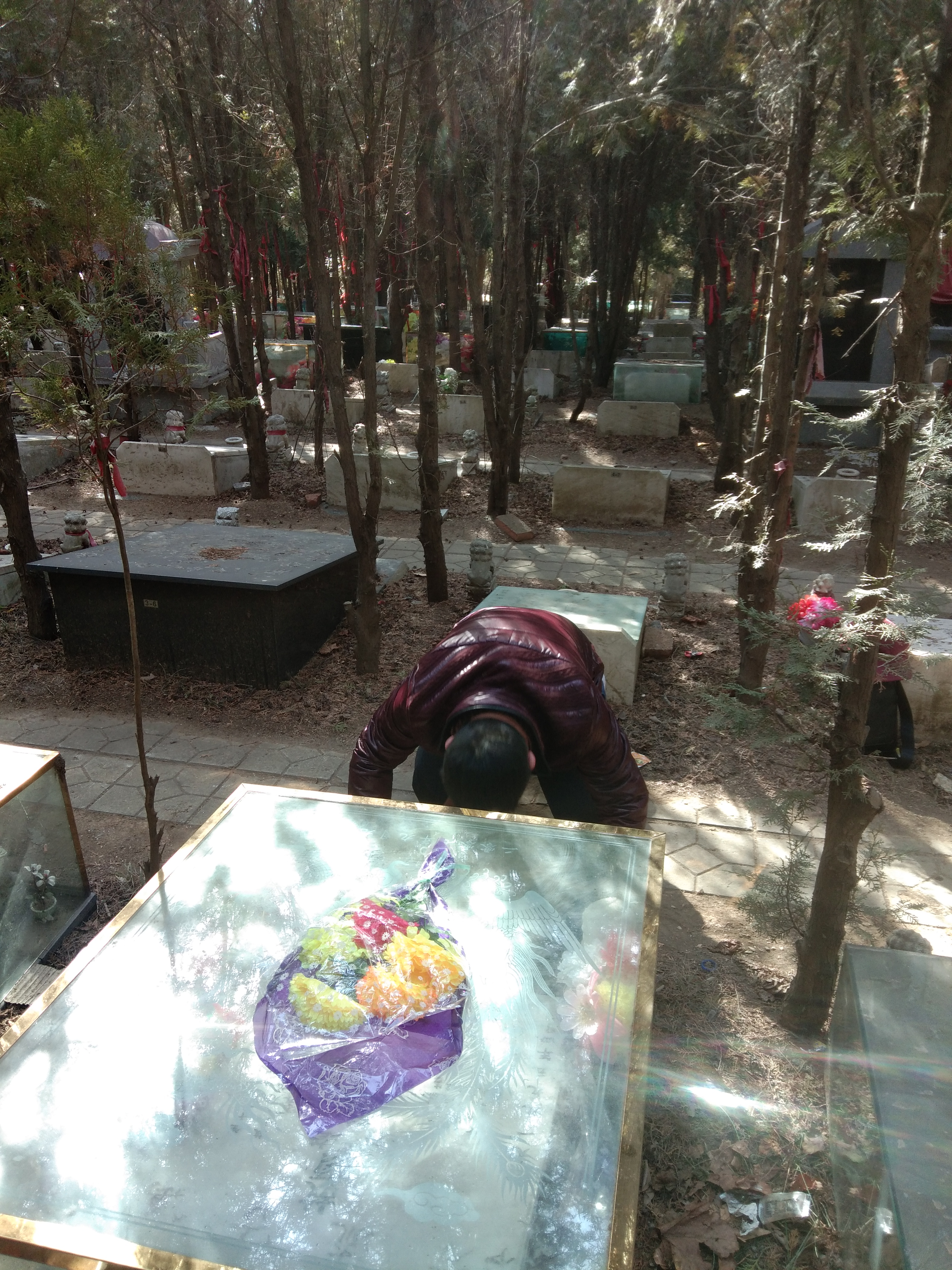
This man is paying his respects to the deceased by kowtowing in a graveyard.

The kowtow is still used as part of a formal induction ceremony in certain traditional trades that involve apprenticeship or discipleship. For example, Chinese martial arts schools often require a student to kowtow to a master. Traditional performing arts often require the kowtow.

== Religion ==
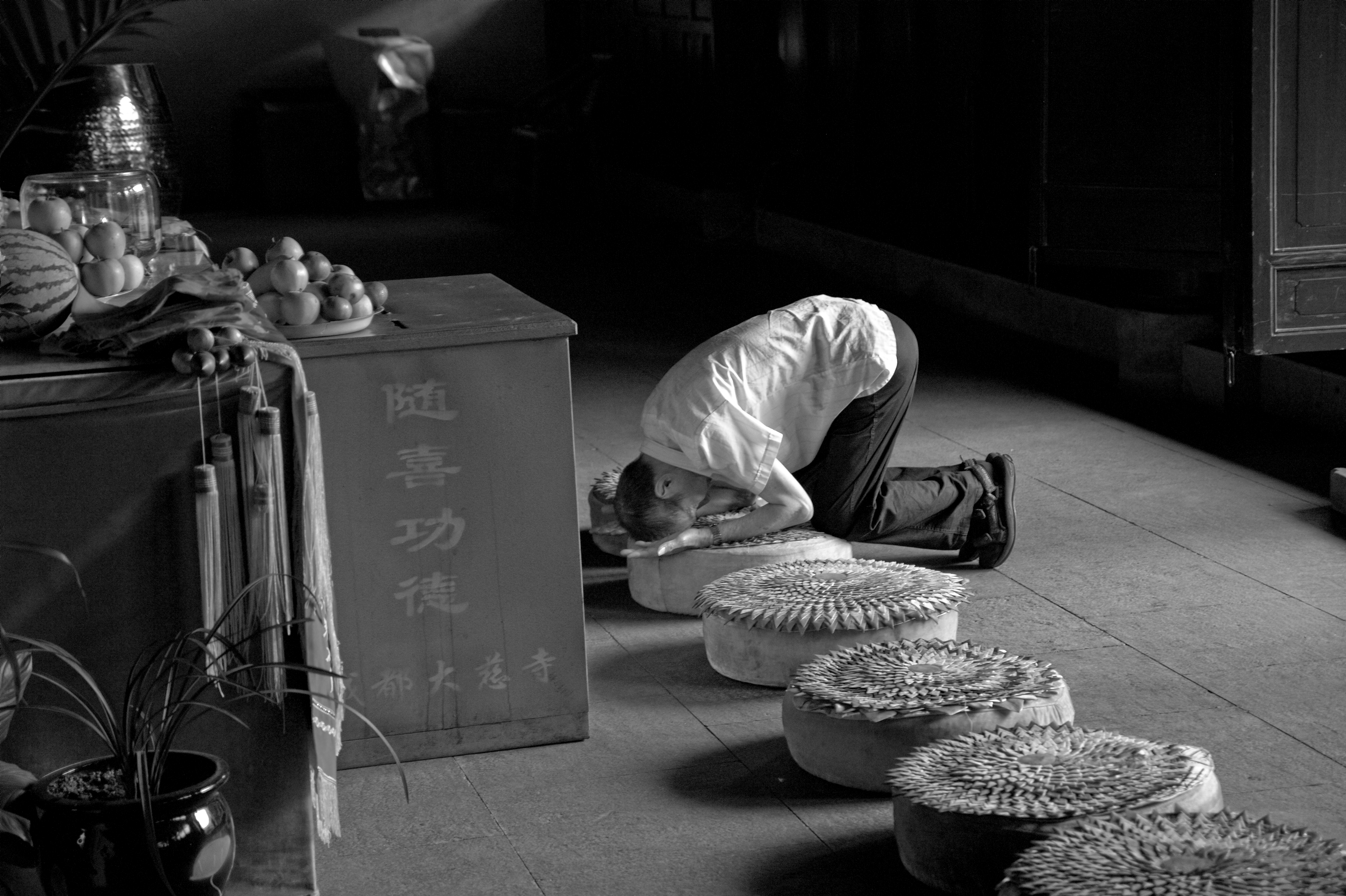
A man kowtowing on a cushion in a temple

Prostration is a general practice in Buddhism, and not restricted to China. The kowtow is often performed in groups of three before Buddhist statues and images or tombs of the dead. In Buddhism it is more commonly termed either "worship with the crown (of the head)" (頂禮 ding li) or "casting the five limbs to the earth" (五體投地 wuti tou di)—referring to the two arms, two legs and forehead. For example, in certain ceremonies, a person would perform a sequence of three sets of three kowtows—stand up and kneel down again between each set—as an extreme gesture of respect; hence the term three kneelings and nine head knockings (三跪九叩之禮). Some Buddhist pilgrims would kowtow once for every three steps made during their long journeys, the number three referring to the Triple Gem of Buddhism, the Buddha, the Dharma, and the Sangha.

== Diplomacy ==
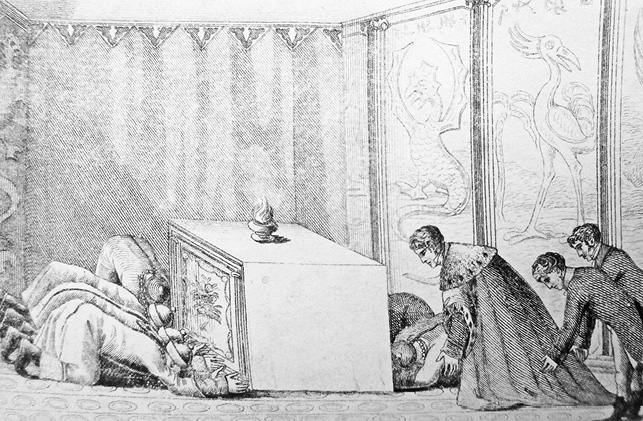
Mandarins perform a kowtow before an altar as Earl Amherst and other members of the failed 1816 Amherst Embassy kneel.

The word "kowtow" came into English in the early 19th century to describe the bow itself, but its meaning soon shifted to describe any abject submission or groveling. The term is still commonly used in English with this meaning, disconnected from the physical act and the East Asian context. (Note: Formerly, historians illustrated the abjectness of kowtowing by claiming that diplomats, such as the British George Macartney, 1st Earl Macartney (1793) and William Pitt Amherst, 1st Earl Amherst (1816), refused submission before the Emperor, causing their visits' failure. However, as Stephen Platt has demonstrated, this oft-told tale about kowtowing does not bear itself out in the primary sources.)

Dutch ambassador Isaac Titsingh did not refuse to kowtow during the course of his 1794–1795 mission to the imperial court of the Qianlong Emperor. The members of the Titsingh mission, including Andreas Everardus van Braam Houckgeest and Chrétien-Louis-Joseph de Guignes, made every effort to conform with the demands of the complex Imperial court etiquette.

The Qing courts gave bitter feedback to the Afghan emir Ahmad Shah when its Afghan envoy, presenting four splendid horses to Qianlong in 1763, refused to perform the kowtow. This was likely a result of the Islamic prohibition on performing Sujud before any except God. Coming amid tense relations between the Qing and Durrani empires, Chinese officials forbade the Afghans from sending envoys to Beijing in the future.

On two occasions, the kowtow was performed by Chinese envoys to a foreign ruler – specifically the Russian Tsar. T'o-Shih, Qing emissary to Russia whose mission to Moscow took place in 1731, kowtowed before Tsarina Anna, as per instructions by the Yongzheng Emperor, as did Desin, who led another mission the next year to the new Russian capital at St. Petersburg. Hsu notes that the Kangxi Emperor, Yongzheng's predecessor, explicitly ordered that Russia be given a special status in Qing foreign relations by not being included among tributary states, i.e. recognition as an implicit equal of China.

The kowtow was often performed in intra-Asian diplomatic relations as well. In 1636, after being defeated by the invading Manchus, King Injo of Joseon (Korea) was forced to surrender by kowtowing three times to pledge tributary status to the Qing Emperor, Hong Taiji. As was customary of all Asian envoys to Qing China, Joseon envoys kowtowed three times to the Qing emperor during their visits to China, continuing until 1896, when the Korean Empire withdrew its tributary status from Qing as a result of the First Sino-Japanese War.

The King of the Ryukyu Kingdom also had to kneel three times on the ground and touch his head nine times to the ground (三拜九叩頭禮), to show his allegiance to the Chinese emperors.

== See also ==
- Chinese social relations
- Culture of China
- Dogeza
- Emoticons for posture
- Finger kowtow:
  - Finger tapping in Chinese tea culture
  - Finger tapping in Yum Cha
- Fist-and-palm, a Chinese gesture for showing respect
- John Moyse, refused to Kowtow
- Orz
- Sifu, martial arts
- Yeongeunmun, Chinese gate in Korea

International:

- Gadaw, a Burmese form of obeisance akin to kowtow
- Maundy (foot washing), another act of extreme humility
- Pranāma, in Indian-derived traditions
- Sankin-kōtai, Japan
- Shuysky Tribute, a similar Eastern European practice
- Sujud, prostration to Allah

General:

- Hand-kissing
- Proskynesis
- Prostration
- Salute
