= Josephine Carr =

WWI Women's Royal Naval Service woman; first Wren casualty of war

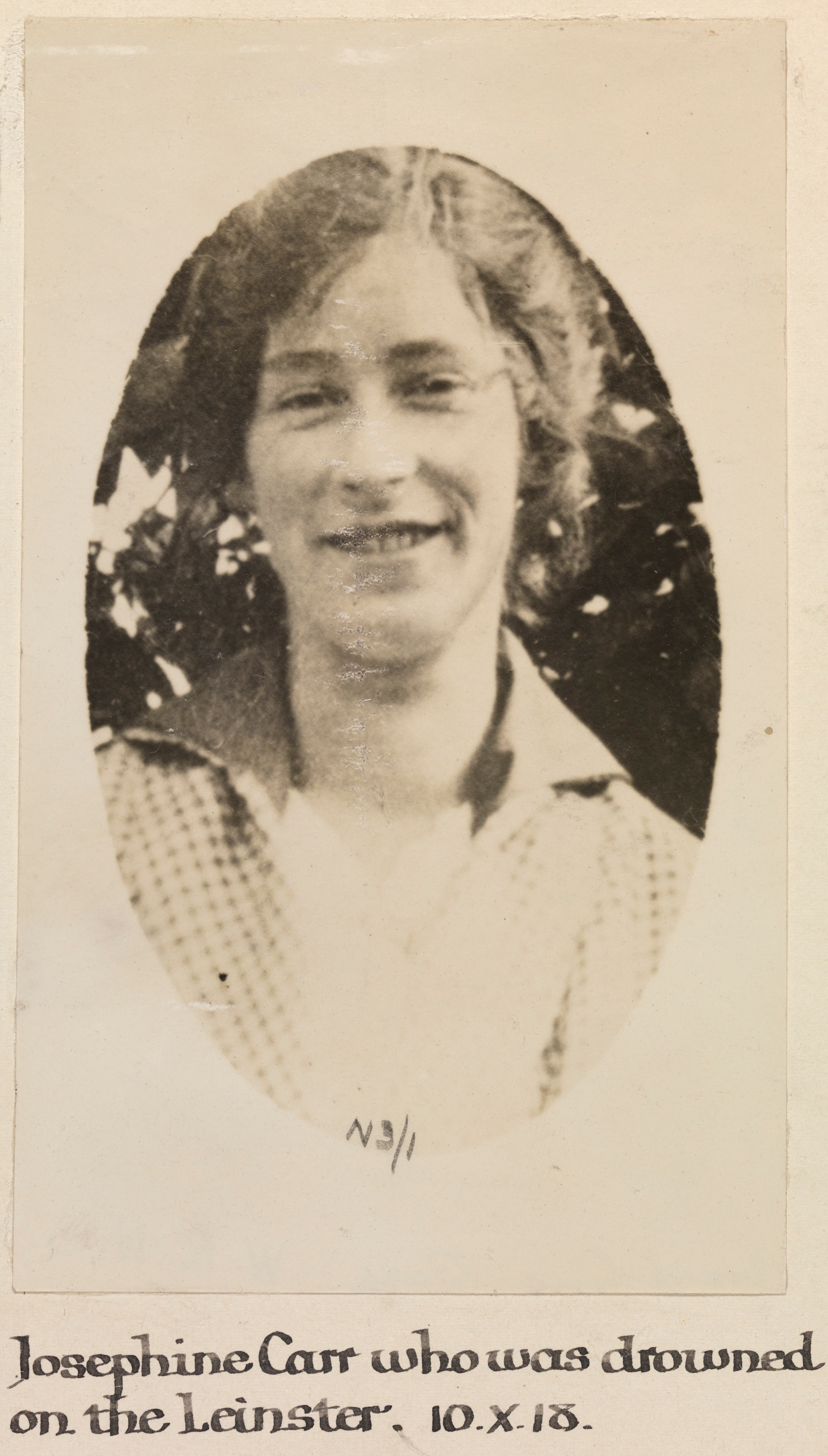
Josephine Carr, c. 1910s

Josephine Carr (c. 1899 – 10 October 1918) was an Irish woman who became the first Women's Royal Naval Service (WRNS) woman to die on active service when the RMS Leinster was torpedoed and sank off the coast of Ireland.

Born in Cork, Ireland to Samuel and Kathleen Carr, Josephine enlisted in the WRNS on 17 September 1917 and worked as a shorthand typist.

On 10 October 1918, Carr and two fellow Wrens, Lilian Barry and Maureen Waters, boarded the RMS Leinster and were on their way to Holyhead to report for duty when, 10 minutes into the voyage, the German submarine UB-123 torpedoed the ship twice. Carr was last seen in the reading room before the first torpedo struck the ship. While Barry and Waters survived and were pulled from the lifeboats, Carr's body was never found. Aged 19, she became the only Wren to die as a result of enemy action in World War I.

Carr is commemorated on the Plymouth Naval Memorial.

== See also ==
- Women in World War I
