= Grangegorman Military Cemetery =

Grangegorman Military Cemetery, Dublin
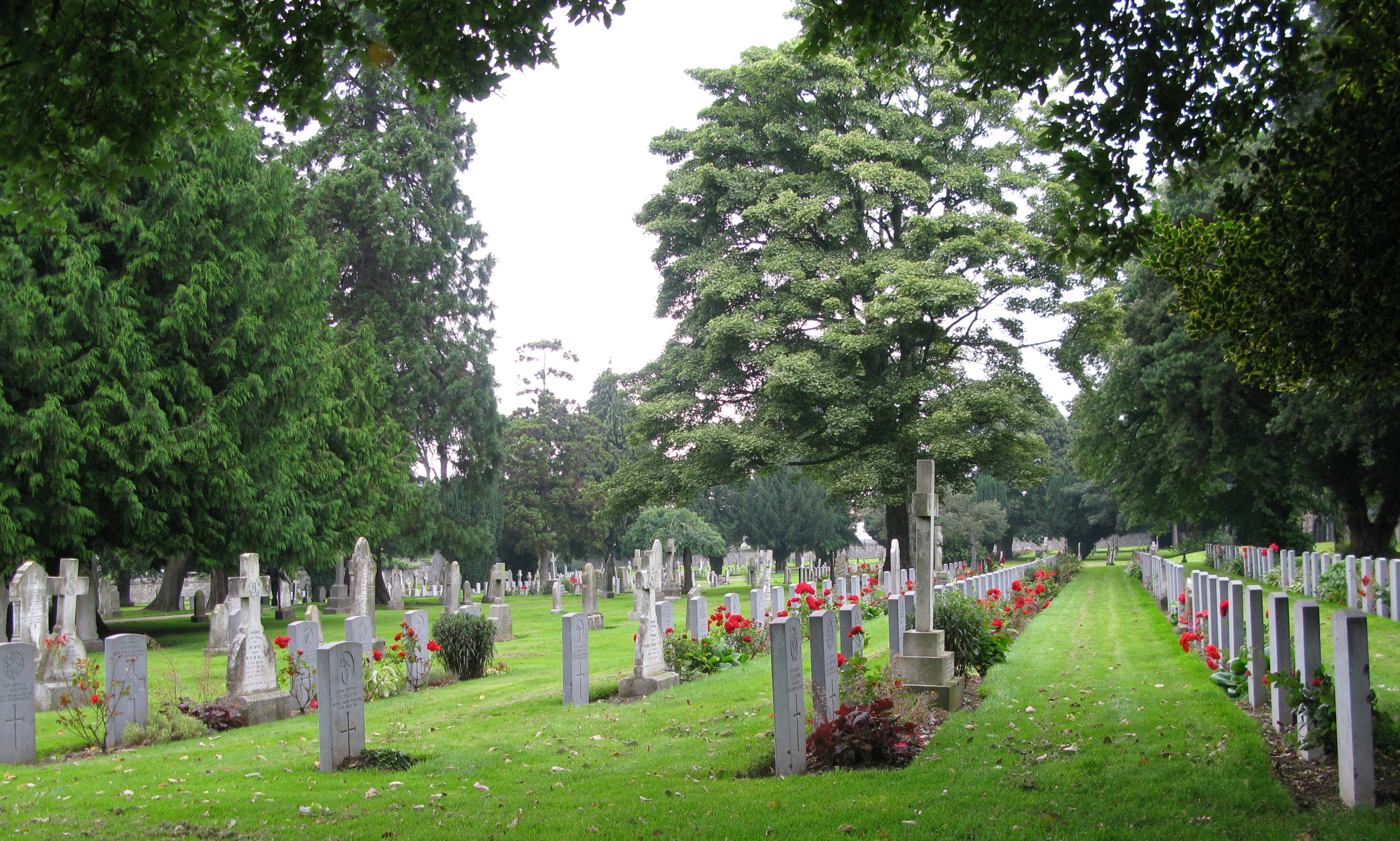
- Cemetery panorama, 2012

Details
- Established: 1876
- Closed: 1999
- Location: Blackhorse Avenue, Cabra, Dublin
- Country: Ireland
- Coordinates: 53.3594°N 6.3060°W
- Type: Military
- Website: Cemetery details. Commonwealth War Graves Commission.
- Find a Grave: Grangegorman Military Cemetery, Dublin

Grangegorman Military Cemetery (Irish: Reilig Mhíleata Ghráinseach Ghormáin) is a British military cemetery in Dublin, Ireland, located on Blackhorse Avenue, parallel to the Navan Road and beside the Phoenix Park.

== The Cemetery ==
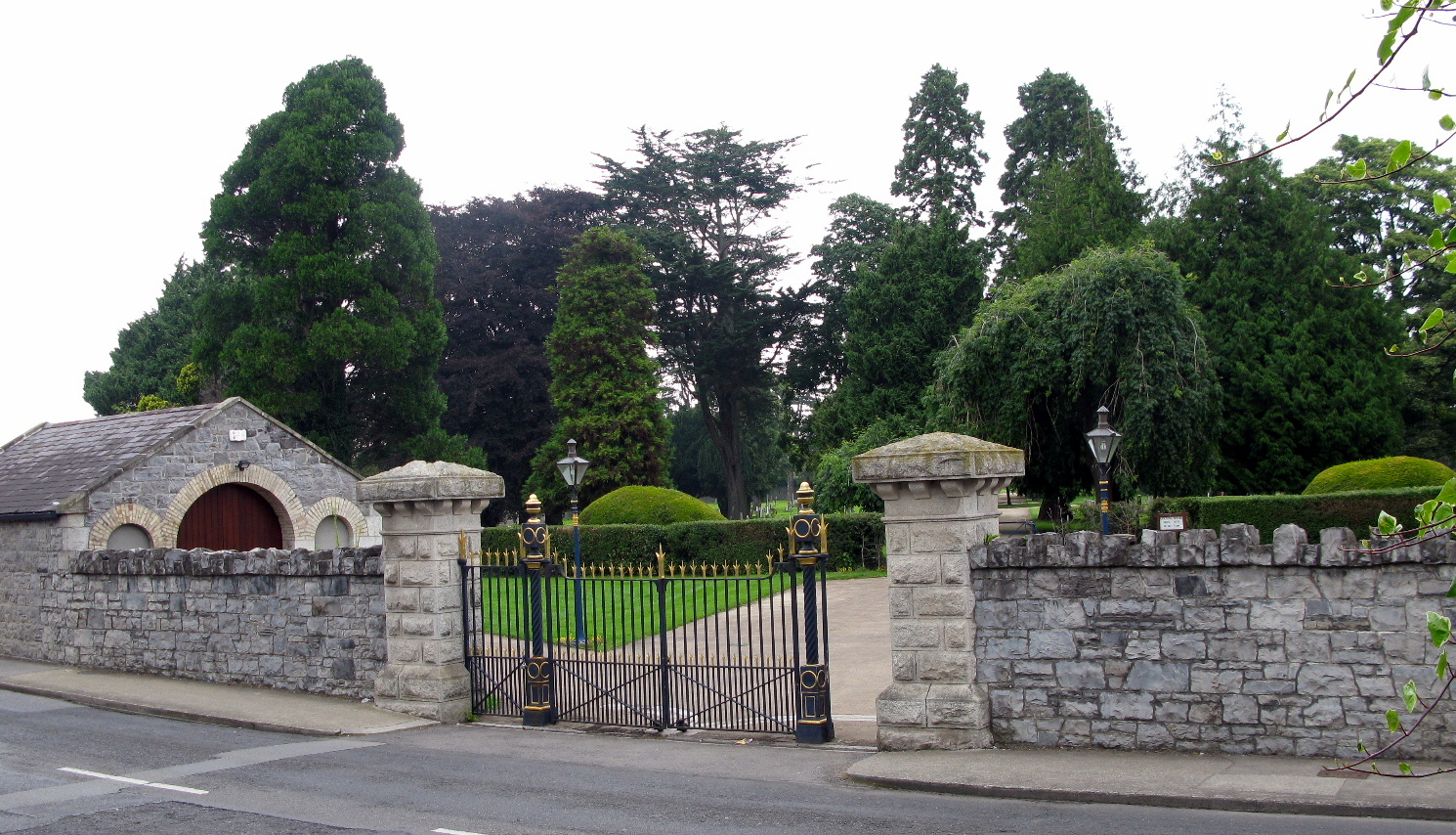
Cemetery entrance, Blackhorse Avenue

Battalion badges are marked on the headstones along with the name of the person buried, their rank and the date of their death, while very few have personal inscriptions. The Royal Dublin Fusiliers have a large number of their members and their closest relatives buried in the graveyard. Mature trees and well-maintained lawns create a reflective atmosphere. Situated beside the Phoenix Park, the cemetery's current comparative anonymity has more to do with those buried there than with its location. It was forgotten after independence in a country forged from a bitter conflict with Great Britain, as many viewed Irishmen who had fought in the British Army as traitors.

Some of the graves were re-located to this site at a later date (nine from King George V Hospital grounds, two from Trinity College grounds, three from Portobello (Barracks) Cemetery, two from Drogheda (Little Calvary) Cemetery and one from Oranmore Old Graveyard).

The Irish Times posited upon "one of the 1916 Rising's unresolved mysteries. Why did the bodies of five British officers lie, apparently unclaimed and forgotten, in waste ground in central Dublin for 46 years?" Their bodies were then discovered and interred in Grangegorman.

The Irish National War Memorial Gardens dedicated to the memory of the 49,400 Irish soldiers who gave their lives in the "Great War, 1914–1918" is approximately 1 mile away in Islandbridge at the other side of Phoenix Park. A Screen Wall Memorial of a simple design standing nearly two metres high and fifteen metres long has been built of Irish limestone to commemorate the names of those war casualties whose graves lie elsewhere in Ireland and can no longer be maintained. Arranged before this memorial are the headstones of the war dead buried in Cork Military Cemetery but now commemorated here.

A Turkish Hazel was planted in the cemetery in 2005 by the ambassadors of Turkey, New Zealand and Australia to Ireland to mark the 90th Anniversary of the Gallipoli landings on 25 April 1915. The cemetery is currently managed by the Office of Public Works to Commonwealth War Graves Commission standards and is the largest military cemetery in Ireland.

== History ==
The cemetery was opened in 1876 to serve as a graveyard for the soldiers of what was then Marlborough Barracks (McKee Barracks) and their families. Since the British Army did not repatriate soldiers killed overseas until recently it contains the remains of soldiers from across the British Empire who died naturally or were killed in action in Ireland. It also contains the remains of some killed in the Crimea. After 1923 only servicemen and their next of kin could be buried there.

=== World War I ===
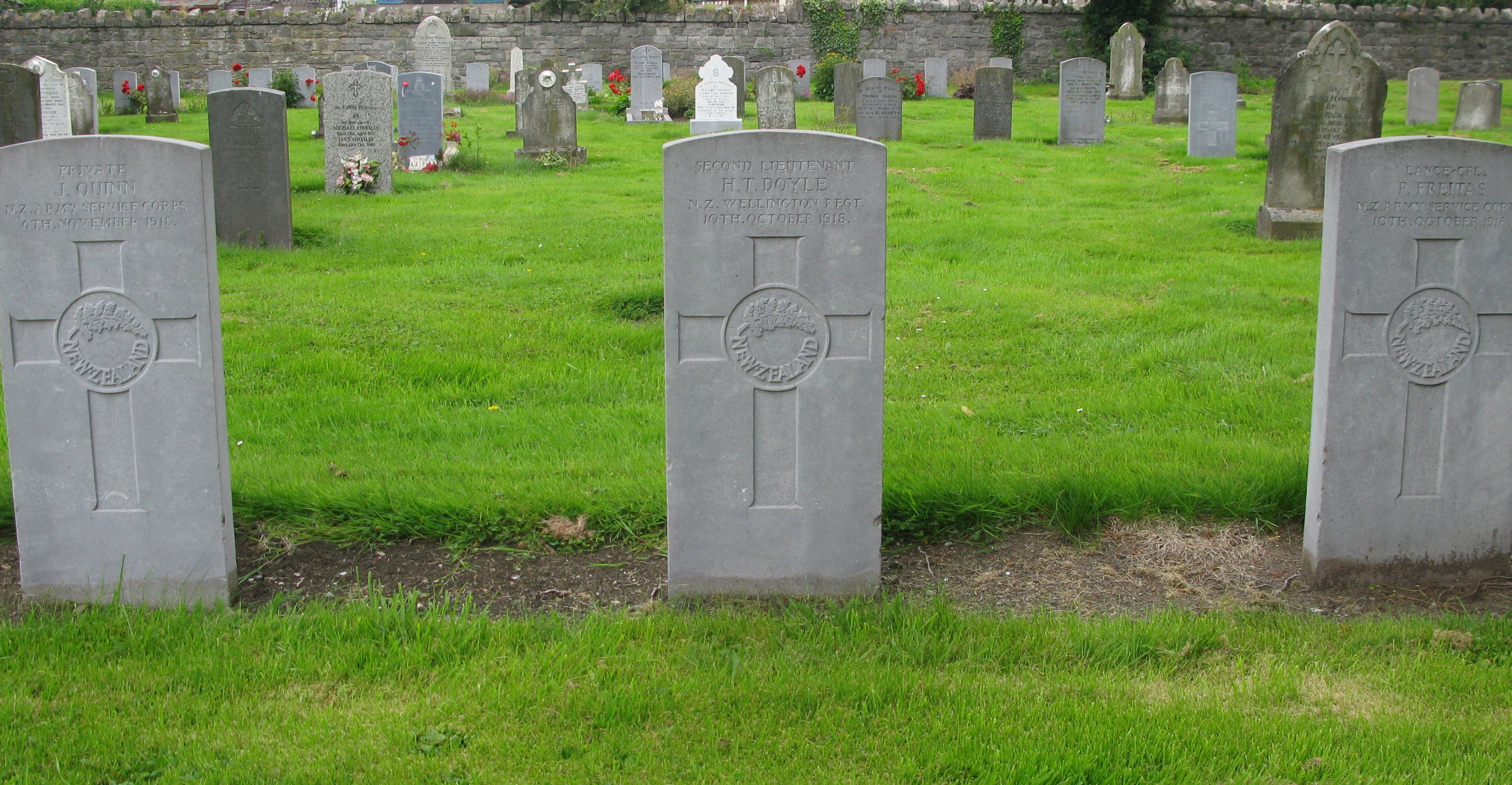
Headstones to three New Zealand soldiers, casualties of World War I

World War One casualties are throughout the graveyard, and two of them are "known only to God" i.e., unidentified. The Australian folk memory of the First World War can be seen in the annual Anzac Day commemoration at the cemetery.

The graves reveal some details about those interred there. Perhaps the best example is the row of burials of soldiers all killed on 10 October 1918. On that day a mail boat, the RMS Leinster, was torpedoed as it left Dublin and many soldiers on board were killed.

The cemetery holds the remains of Victoria Cross recipient Martin Doyle (1891–1940).

=== Easter Rising ===
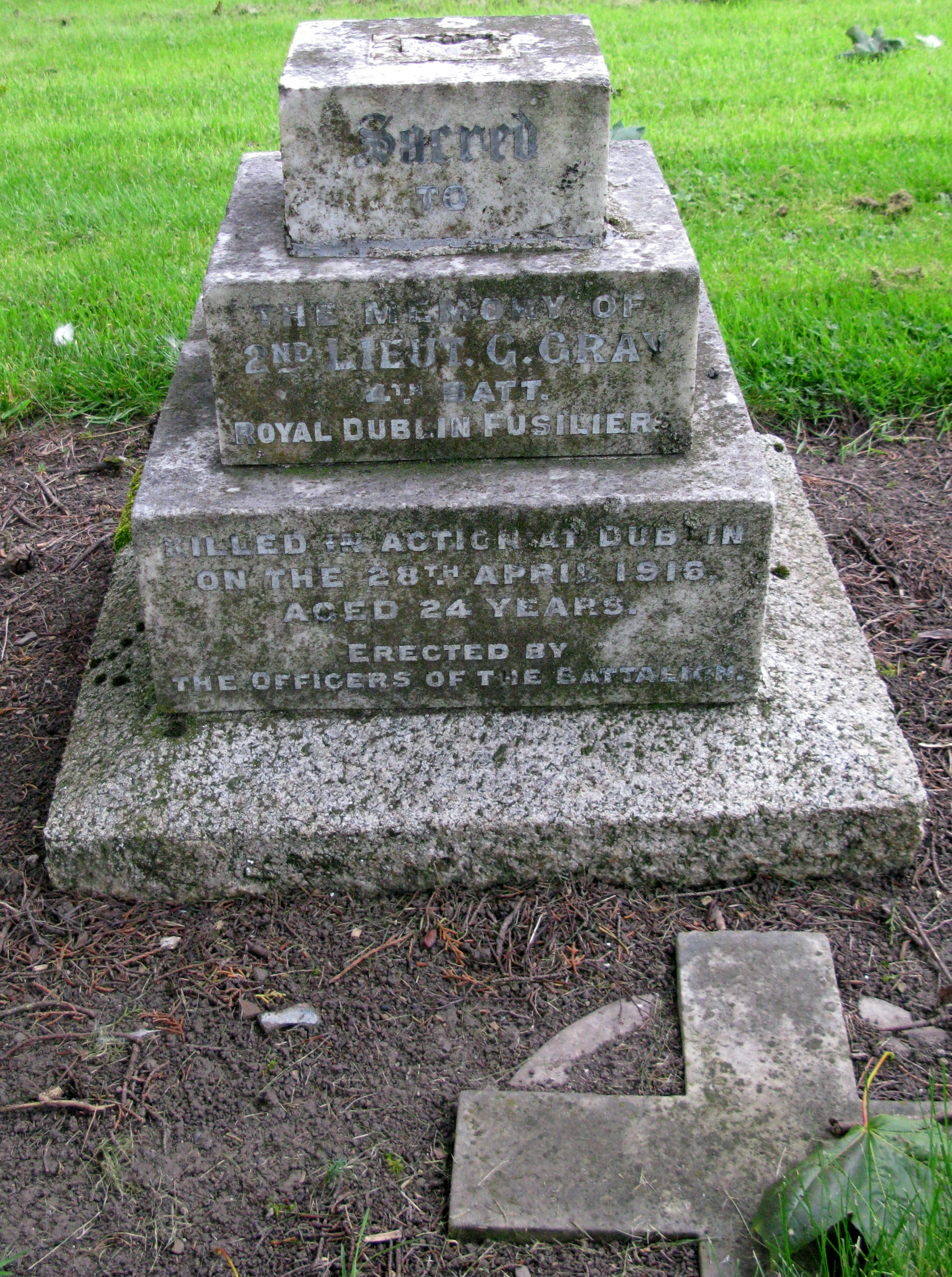
Memorial to 2nd Lieut. G. Gray, Royal Dublin Fusiliers, killed in action during the Easter Rising

The graves of those who were killed between 24 April and the first week of May include those of some of the 118 soldiers who were killed in the course of the 1916 rising. There are numerous graves of Sherwood Foresters and South Staffordshire Regiment personnel who suffered serious casualties when they attempted to cross Mount Street Bridge on the Grand Canal. Also included are Algernon Lucas and Basil Henry Worsley Worswick, subalterns of the King Edward's Horse, both (alongside two civilians) arrested and shot by their own side (pickets of the Royal Dublin Fusiliers), who mistakenly thought they were intruders aiding rebels in the Guinness brewery.

According to the Irish Times, "Families came to Dublin Castle in May 1916 to reclaim the bodies and funerals were arranged. Bodies which were not claimed were given military funerals and reinterred in the British military cemetery at Blackhorse Avenue, Grangegorman."

=== Later Conflicts ===
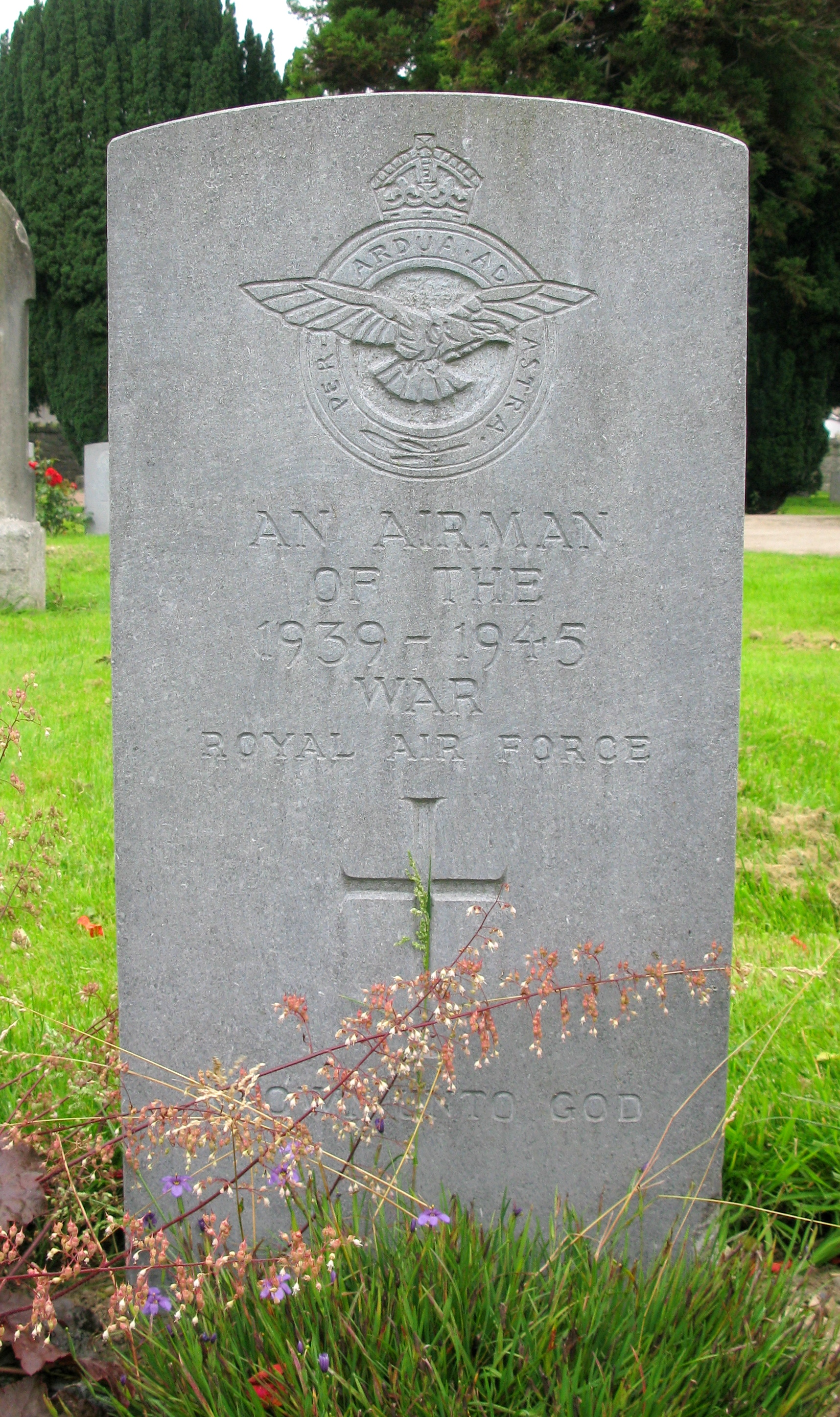
Grave of unidentified RAF flyer killed during World War II

The last major conflict in the 26 counties involving the British Army was the Irish War of Independence. There are graves of soldiers killed between 1919 and 1921. There are also the graves of 12 British military personnel (one of whom is an unidentified airman) who died in World War II.

The last burial took place in 1999.

== Further information ==
Burial Records: (acknowledged as not 100% complete)

- Surnames A–F
- Surnames G–L
- Surnames M–R
- Surnames S–Z

== Sources ==
- Thomas P. Dooley: Irishmen or English Soldiers?: the Times of a Southern Catholic Irish Man (1876–1916), Liverpool Press (1995), ISBN 0853236003.
- Myles Dungan: They Shall not Grow Old: Irish Soldiers in the Great War, Four Courts Press (1997), ISBN 1851823476.
- Keith Jeffery: Ireland and the Great War, Press Syndicate of the University of Cambridge (2000), ISBN 0521773237.
- Bryan Cooper (1918): The 10th (Irish) Division in Gallipoli, Irish Academic Press (1993), (2003). ISBN 0716525178.
- Terence Denman: Ireland's unknown Soldiers: the 16th (Irish) Division in the Great War, Irish Academic Press (1992), (2003) ISBN 0716524953.
- Desmond & Jean Bowen: Heroic Option: The Irish in the British Army, Pen & Sword Books (2005), ISBN 1844151522.
- Steven Moore: The Irish on the Somme (2005), ISBN 0954971515.
- Thomas Bartlett & Keith Jeffery: A Military History of Ireland, Cambridge University Press (1996) (2006), ISBN 0521629896
- David Murphy: Irish Regiments in the World Wars, Osprey Publishing (2007), ISBN 978-1846030154
- David Murphy: The Irish Brigades, 1685–2006, A gazetteer of Irish Military Service past and present, Four Courts Press (2007)
  The Military Heritage of Ireland Trust. ISBN 978-1846820809
- Stephen Walker: Forgotten Soldiers; The Irishmen shot at dawn Gill & Nacmillan (2007), ISBN 978-0717141821
