= Martin Doyle (VC) =

Recipient of the Victoria Cross

Martin Doyle VC MM
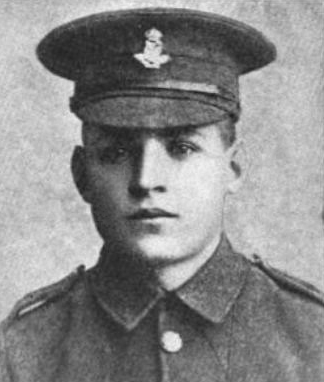
- Born: 25 October 1891; New Ross, County Wexford, Ireland
- Died: 20 November 1940 (aged 49); Dublin, Ireland
- Burial place: Grangegorman Military Cemetery, Dublin
- Military career
- Allegiance: United Kingdom of Great Britain and Ireland (Republic of Ireland) Ireland
- Branch: British Army; Irish Republican Army; National Army; Defence Forces; Reserve Defence Forces
- Rank: Company Sergeant Major
- Units: Royal Munster Fusiliers
- Conflicts: World War I Irish War of Independence; Irish Civil War
- Awards: Victoria Cross; Military Medal

Martin Doyle VC, MM (25 October 1891 – 20 November 1940) was an Irish member of the British Army during the First World War, and a recipient of the Victoria Cross, the highest and most prestigious award for gallantry in the face of the enemy that can be awarded to British and Commonwealth forces.

After the war, he joined the Irish Republican Army during the Irish War of Independence, served with the National Army during the Irish Civil War, in the Defence Forces until 1937 and Reserve Defence Forces until 1939.

== World War I ==
Doyle was born in New Ross, County Wexford on 25 October 1891. He initially joined the Royal Irish Regiment in 1909 being given the Service Number 9962. He was transferred to the Royal Dublin Fusiliers in August 1914. After service with the Royal Dublin Fusiliers he joined The Royal Munster Fusiliers and was awarded the Military Medal.

In September 1918 as a company sergeant-major in the 1st Battalion, The Royal Munster Fusiliers, 16th (Irish) Division during the First World War when the following deed took place for which he was awarded the VC:

For most conspicuous bravery on the 2nd September, 1918, near Riencourt, when as Acting Company Serjeant-Major, command of the company devolved upon him consequent on officer casualties.

Observing that some of our men were surrounded by the enemy, he led a party to their assistance, and by skill and leadership worked his way along the trenches, killed several of the enemy and extricated the party, carrying back, under heavy fire, a wounded officer to a place of safety. Later, seeing a Tank in difficulties, he rushed forward under intense fire, routed the enemy who were attempting to get into it, and prevented the advance of another enemy party collecting for a further attack on the Tank. An enemy machine gun now opened on the Tank at close range, rendering it impossible to get the wounded away, whereupon C.S.M. Doyle, with great gallantry, rushed forward, and, single-handed, silenced the machine gun, capturing it with three prisoners. He then carried a wounded man to safety under very heavy fire.

Later in the day, when the enemy counterattacked his position, he showed great power of command, driving back the enemy and capturing many prisoners. Throughout the whole of these operations C.S.M. Doyle set the very highest example to all ranks by his courage and total disregard of danger.

== IRA service ==
In 1920, Doyle joined the Irish Republican Army and fought in the Irish War of Independence. He served with the pro-treaty National Army in the Irish Civil War, and retired in 1937. Some sources have described Doyle as acting as an intelligence officer for the IRA in east County Clare.

He died in Dublin in 1940 from poliomyelitis, aged 49, and is buried in Grangegorman Military Cemetery.

== Sources ==
- The Register of the Victoria Cross (1981, 1988 and 1997)
- Clarke, Brian D. H. (1986). "A register of awards to Irish-born officers and men". The Irish Sword. XVI (64): 185–287.
- Ireland's VCs (Dept. of Economic Development 1995)
- Monuments to Courage (David Harvey, 1999)
- Irish Winners of the Victoria Cross (Richard Doherty & David Truesdale, 2000)
