= RMS Connaught =

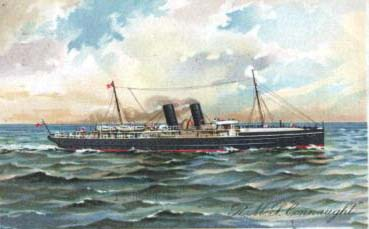

History

United Kingdom
- Name: RMS Connaught
- Namesake: Connaught
- Operator: City of Dublin Steam Packet Company
- Builder: Laird Brothers, Birkenhead
- Launched: 17 June 1897
- Fate: Torpedoed and sunk, 3 March 1917

General characteristics
- Type: Steamship
- Tonnage: 2,646 GRT
- Length: 377 ft (115 m)
- Propulsion: 8-cylinder steam engine; 2 screws
- Speed: 24 knots (44 km/h; 28 mph)

RMS Connaught was a steamship built in 1897 and operated by the City of Dublin Steam Packet Company for Royal Mail as well as passenger service. Connaught was the second ship of this name operated by the line. She was torpedoed and sunk by German submarine U-48 on 3 March 1917.

== History ==
In 1895, the City of Dublin Steam Packet Company ordered four steamers for Royal Mail service, named for four provinces of Ireland, RMS Connaught, Leinster, Munster and Ulster; these four were commonly referred to as "The Provinces" after the four traditional provinces of Ireland.

In 1897, the line was awarded an additional 21 years for their contract with the Post Office, and so they ordered four replacement ships from Laird's of Birkenhead, which were to carry the same names as the former ships.

As one of these, Connaught was a twin-screw vessel powered by an eight-cylinder steam engine, capable of 24 kn (28 mph; 44 km/h). She measured 2,646 GRT and had a length of 377 ft (115 m).

With the First World War in progress, Connaught was commandeered in 1915 by the British War Office and was employed as a troopship. Having transported troops the previous evening, on 3 March 1917, Connaught was returning to Southampton from Le Havre. At about 13:45, submarine U-48 fired a torpedo which exploded aft on the starboard side. The ship's wireless was disabled, so an S.O.S. could not be sent. 15 minutes later, a second torpedo struck amidships on the port side. Three crewmen having been killed, the rest of the crew took to the lifeboats. Connaught sank within four minutes of the second torpedo striking. The sinking occurred in the English Channel about 29 mi (47 km) south of the Light Vessel Owers.
