= SM UB-123 =

German U-boat

- UB-148 at sea, a U-boat similar to UB-123.

History

German Empire
- Name: UB-123
- Ordered: 6 / 8 February 1917
- Builder: AG Weser, Bremen
- Cost: 3,654,000 German Papiermark
- Yard number: 296
- Laid down: 13 July 1917
- Launched: 2 March 1918
- Commissioned: 6 April 1918
- Fate: Sunk 19 October 1918

General characteristics
- Class & type: Type UB III submarine
- Displacement: 512 t (504 long tons) surfaced; 643 t (633 long tons) submerged
- Length: 55.85 m (183 ft 3 in) (o/a)
- Beam: 5.80 m (19 ft)
- Draught: 3.72 m (12 ft 2 in)
- Propulsion: 2 × propeller shaft; 2 × Körting four-stroke 6-cylinder diesel engines, 1,050 bhp (780 kW); 2 × Siemens-Schuckert electric motors, 780 shp (580 kW)
- Speed: 13.9 knots (25.7 km/h; 16.0 mph) surfaced; 7.6 knots (14.1 km/h; 8.7 mph) submerged
- Range: 7,280 nmi (13,480 km; 8,380 mi) at 6 knots (11 km/h; 6.9 mph) surfaced; 55 nmi (102 km; 63 mi) at 4 knots (7.4 km/h; 4.6 mph) submerged
- Test depth: 50 m (160 ft)
- Complement: 3 officers, 31 men
- Armament: 5 × 50 cm (19.7 in) torpedo tubes (4 bow, 1 stern); 10 torpedoes; 1 × 10.5 cm (4.13 in) deck gun

Service record
- Part of: III Flotilla; 22 June – 19 October 1918
- Commanders: Oblt.z.S. Robert Ramm; 6 April – 19 October 1918
- Operations: 2 patrols
- Victories: 1 merchant ship sunk (2,646 GRT); 1 merchant ship damaged (4,095 GRT); 3 merchant ships taken as prize (3,530 GRT)

SM UB-123 was a German Type UB III submarine or U-boat in the German Imperial Navy (German: Kaiserliche Marine) during World War I. She was commissioned into the German Imperial Navy on 6 April 1918 as SM UB-123. (Note: "SM" stands for "Seiner Majestät" (English: His Majesty's) and combined with the U for Unterseeboot would be translated as His Majesty's Submarine.)

She torpedoed and sunk Leinster, a vessel operated by the City of Dublin Steam Packet Company on 10 October 1918, shortly after the new parliamentary based German Government under Max von Baden had asked U.S. President Woodrow Wilson to negotiate an armistice.

Leinster went down just outside Dublin Bay. Over 500 people perished in the sinking – the greatest single loss of life in the Irish Sea.

UB-123 struck a mine at the North Sea Mine Barrage on 19 October 1918, all 36 crew members died in the event.

== Construction ==
She was built by AG Weser of Bremen and following just under a year of construction, launched at Bremen on 2 March 1918. UB-123 was commissioned later the same year under the command of Oblt.z.S. Robert Ramm. Like all Type UB III submarines, UB-123 carried 10 torpedoes and was armed with a 10.5 cm (4.13 in) deck gun. UB-123 would carry a crew of up to 3 officer and 31 men and had a cruising range of 7,280 nautical miles (13,480 km; 8,380 mi). UB-123 had a displacement of 512 t (504 long tons) while surfaced and 643 t (633 long tons) when submerged. Her engines enabled her to travel at 13.9 knots (25.7 km/h; 16.0 mph) when surfaced and 7.6 knots (14.1 km/h; 8.7 mph) when submerged.

== Summary of raiding history ==
Date	Name	Nationality	Tonnage (Note: Tonnages are in gross register tons)	Fate
16 July 1918	Anine	Denmark	1,299	Captured as prize
16 July 1918	Constantin	Denmark	831	Captured as prize
16 July 1918	Hjortholm	Denmark	1,400	Captured as prize
10 October 1918	Leinster	United Kingdom	2,646	Sunk
16 October 1918	Caloria	United States	4,095	Damaged

== Bibliography ==
- Bendert, Harald (2000). Die UB-Boote der Kaiserlichen Marine, 1914–1918. Einsätze, Erfolge, Schicksal (in German). Hamburg: Verlag E.S. Mittler & Sohn GmbH. ISBN 3-8132-0713-7.
- Gröner, Erich; Jung, Dieter; Maass, Martin (1991). German Warships 1815–1945, U-boats and Mine Warfare Vessels. Vol. 2. Translated by Thomas, Keith; Magowan, Rachel. London: Conway Maritime Press. ISBN 0-85177-593-4.
- Rössler, Eberhard (1979). Die deutschen U-Boote und ihre Werften: eine Bilddokumentation über den deutschen U-Bootbau; in zwei Bänden (in German). Vol. I. Munich: Bernard & Graefe. ISBN 3-7637-5213-7.
