= PS Queen Victoria (1838) =

Paddle steamer wrecked off the Baily Lighthouse, Ireland

Coordinates: 53°21.50′N 06°03.00′W

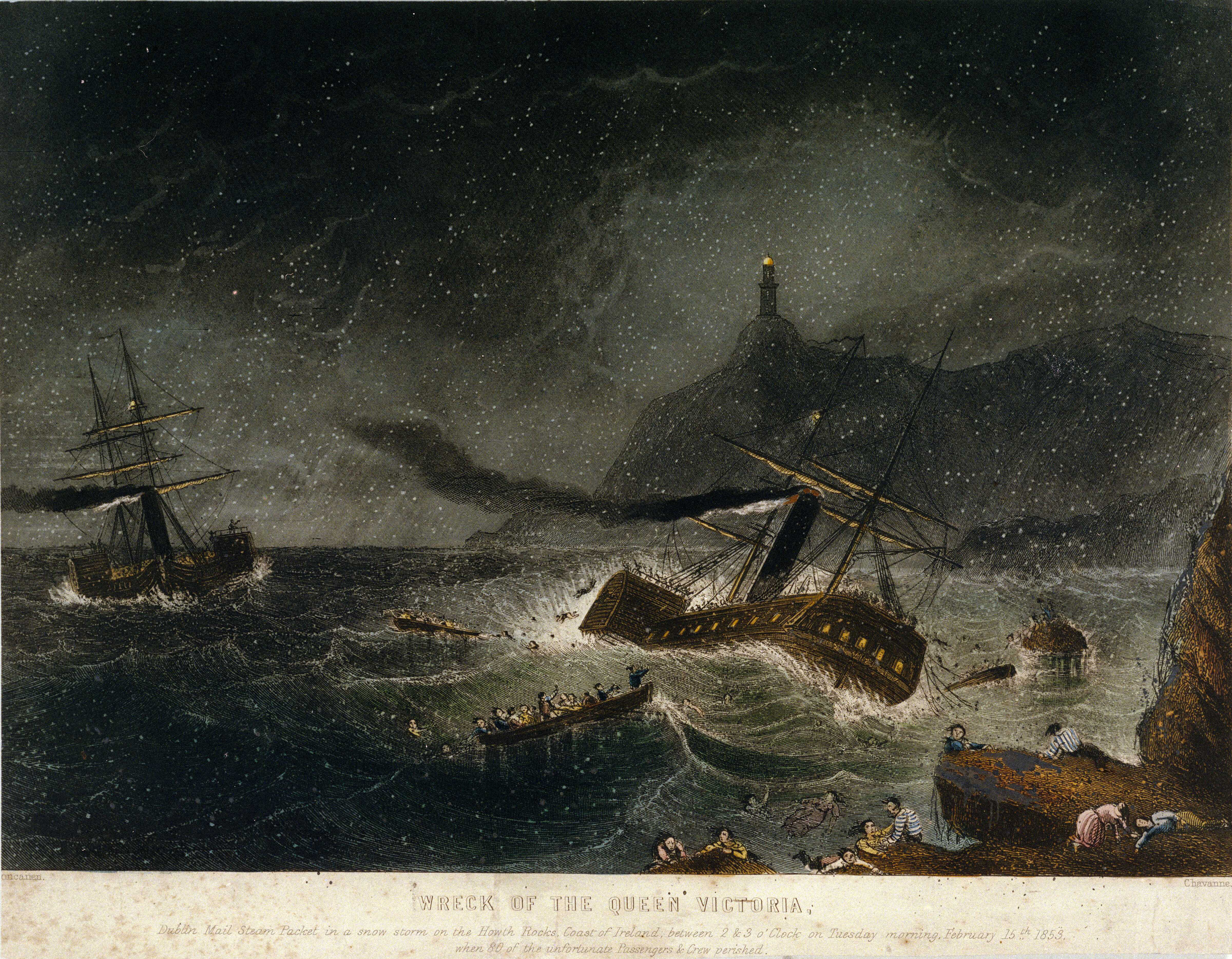
Wreck of the Queen Victoria in a snowstorm on the Howth Rocks, between 2 and 3 o'clock on Tuesday morning, 15 February 1853, showing the paddle steamer Roscommon, chartered by the Chester and Holyhead Railway Company attempting a rescue

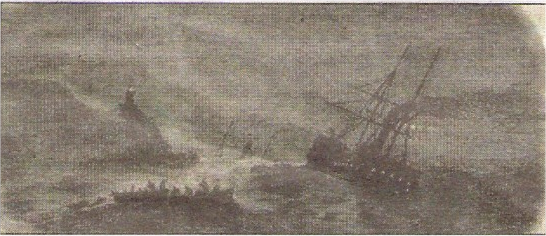
Queen Victoria's shipwreck as depicted in The Nation

PS Queen Victoria was a paddle steamer built for the City of Dublin Steam Packet Company in 1838 and wrecked in 1853 with the loss of more than 80 passengers and crew.

== History ==
Queen Victoria was built by Wilson shipbuilders of Glasgow, Scotland in 1838 for The City Of Dublin Steam Packet Company. She had a wooden hull, was 150 feet long and was powered by a two-cylinder steam engine.

The Queen Victoria left Liverpool on the night of 14 February 1853 with cargo and approximately 100 passengers. As it approached the Irish coast at Howth it was hit by a snowstorm. It struck Howth Head around 2:00am on 15 February. The Captain backed the ship away from the Head in hopes of being able to navigate into the harbour. The damage to the ship was more extensive than the captain thought and it quickly began to fill with water. It drifted, dead in the water, and struck below the Baily Lighthouse. It sank within 15 minutes of the second hit, 100 yards south of the lighthouse. Approximately 83 passengers and crew perished, including the Captain. One lifeboat, with 17 passengers, made it to shore.

A Board of Trade inquiry blamed the ship's captain and first officer, as well as the lighthouse crew. A fog bell was supposed to have been installed in the lighthouse in 1846, seven years earlier, but was delayed due to costs of other construction projects. The bell was finally installed in April 1853, as a result of the Queen Victoria shipwreck and the subsequent inquiry.

At least one attempt to raise the ship was made afterwards, which failed, and the ship was salvaged where she lay. The wreck is still in place.

Members of the Marlin Sun Aqua Club, Dublin discovered the wreck in 1983. They reported their discovery to the authorities, and were in part responsible for having the first Underwater Preservation Order placed on a shipwreck in Irish waters. They also carried out the first underwater survey on such a wreck. The wreck was the first to be protected by The National Monuments Act (Historic Wreck), when the order was granted in 1984, thanks to representations made by Kevin Crothers, IUART, and the Maritime Institute of Ireland.
