= RMS Royal Adelaide =

Paddle steamer sunk off Kent in 1850

Coordinates: 51°29.5′N 01°20.9′E

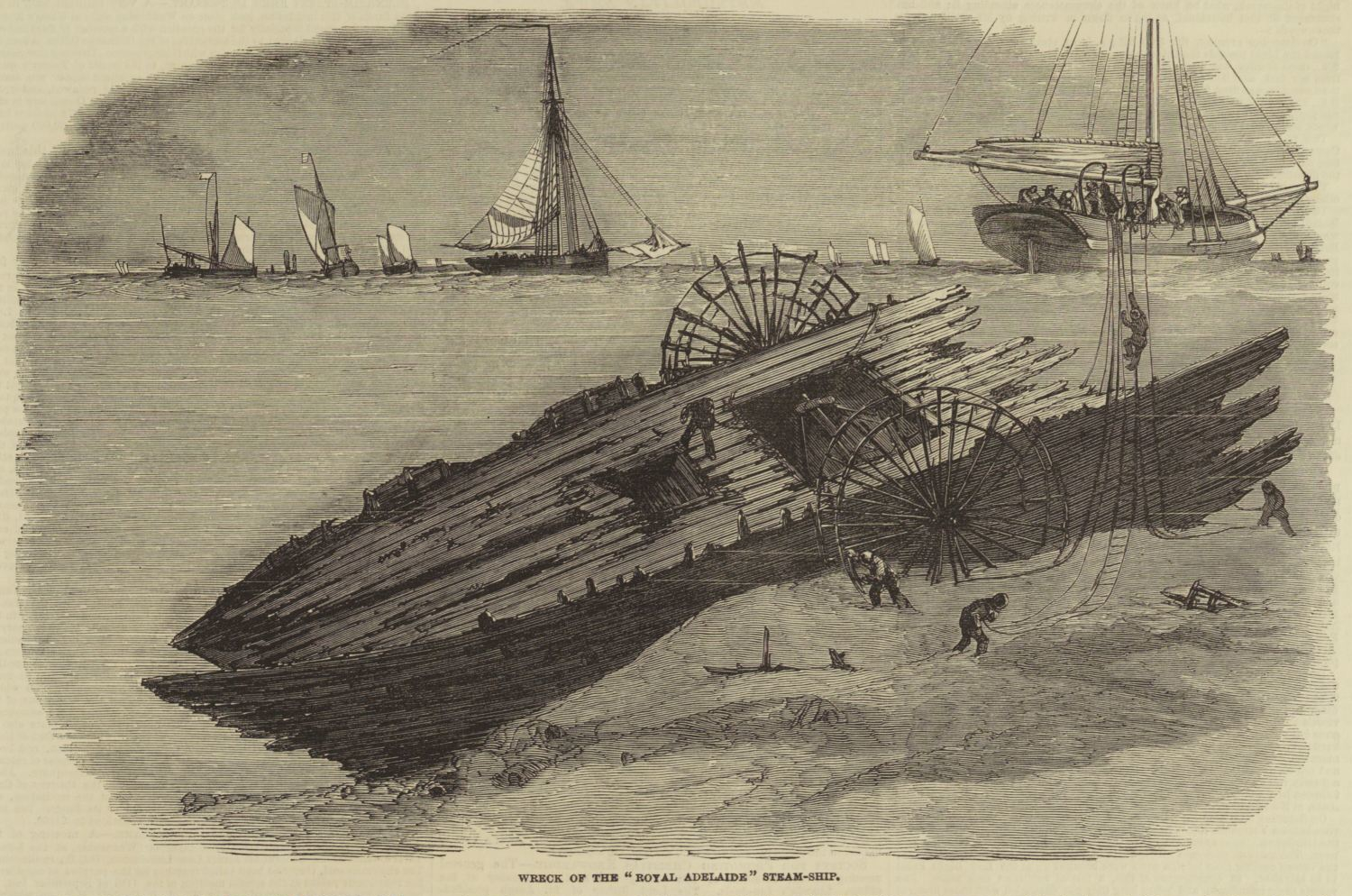
- Divers working on the wreck of the 'Royal Adelaide'

History
- Name: RMS Royal Adelaide
- Owner: City of Dublin Steam Packet Company
- Launched: 1838
- Fate: Wrecked on 30 March 1850

General characteristics
- Class & type: Paddle steamer
- Tonnage: 450 GRT
- Length: 184 ft (56 m)
- Installed power: 140 nhp
- Propulsion: Diagonal compound engine
- Speed: 11 kn (13 mph)

RMS Royal Adelaide was a paddle steamship owned and operated by the City of Dublin Steam Packet Company. Its principal route ran between London and Cork.

== Final journey ==
The Royal Adelaide, captained by John Batty, left Cork fully laden with cargo and about 250 passengers on Wednesday, 27 March 1850, touching off at Plymouth on the Thursday evening. By the time the ship left Plymouth for London at 3.00 am on Friday, there were almost 300 deck passengers.

The ship was lost at about 11.00 pm on Saturday, 30 March 1850 on Tongue Sands north of Margate, with the loss of all on board. News only reached London late on Sunday as the river pilot waiting for the ship happened to meet a Deal pilot (Charles Gillham) who reported seeing a ship of a similar description in distress the previous evening (London Illustrated News 6 and 13 April 1850).

The dead included more than 150 deck passengers from Ireland, during a time when the Great Famine was at its height.

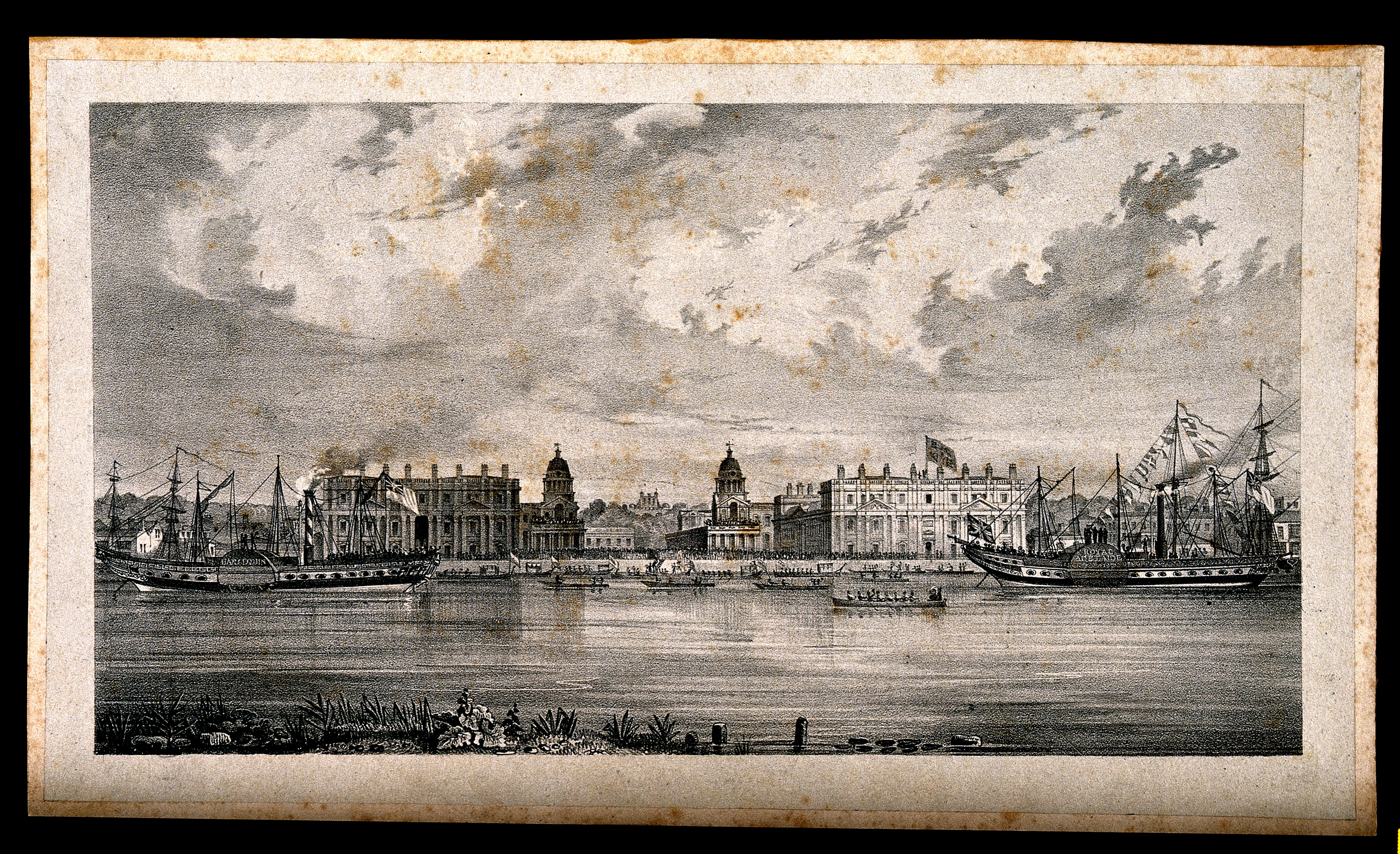
The Royal Adelaide at the Royal Naval Hospital, Greenwich
