= RMS Leinster =

Torpedoed mailboat (1918)

Coordinates: 53.3147°N 5.7952°W

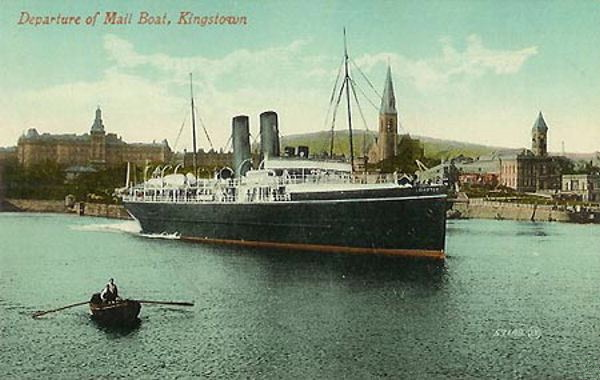
- Postcard image of RMS Leinster

History

United Kingdom
- Name: RMS Leinster
- Namesake: Leinster
- Owner: City of Dublin Steam Packet Company
- Port of registry: Dublin, Ireland
- Route: Kingstown (now Dún Laoghaire)-Holyhead
- Ordered: 1895
- Builder: Laird Brothers of Birkenhead
- Cost: £95,000
- Yard number: 612
- Launched: 12 September 1896
- Completed: January 1897
- Out of service: 10 October 1918
- Fate: Torpedoed and sunk on 10 October 1918

General characteristics
- Type: Steamship
- Tonnage: 2,646 GRT
- Length: 378 ft (115 m)
- Beam: 75 ft (23 m)
- Height: 42 ft (13 m)
- Installed power: Single eight-cylinder triple-expansion steam engine
- Propulsion: Twin propellers
- Speed: 24 knots (44 km/h; 28 mph)
- Armament: During World War I: 1 × 12-pounder gun; 2 × signal guns

RMS Leinster was an Irish ship operated by the City of Dublin Steam Packet Company. She served as the Kingstown-Holyhead mailboat until she was torpedoed and sunk by the German submarine UB-123 on 10 October 1918, while bound for Holyhead. She sank just outside Dublin Bay at a point 4 nautical miles (7.4 km; 4.6 mi) east of the Kish light.

The exact number of dead is unknown but researchers from the National Maritime Museum of Ireland believe it was at least 564, which would make it the largest single loss of life in the Irish Sea.

== Design ==
In 1895, the City of Dublin Steam Packet Company ordered four steamers for Royal Mail service, named for four provinces of Ireland: RMS Leinster, RMS Connaught, RMS Munster, and RMS Ulster. The Leinster was a 3,069-ton packet steamship with a service speed of 24 knots (44 km/h; 28 mph). The vessel, which was built at Laird's in Birkenhead, England, was driven by two independent four-cylinder triple-expansion steam engines. During the First World War, the twin-propellered ship was armed with one 12-pounder and two signal guns.

== Sinking ==
The ship's log states that she carried 77 crew and 694 passengers on her final voyage. The ship had previously been attacked in the Irish Sea but the torpedoes missed their target. Those on board included more than 100 British civilians, 22 postal sorters (working in the mail room) and almost 500 military personnel from the Royal Navy, British Army and Royal Air Force. Also aboard were nurses from Great Britain, Ireland, Australia, New Zealand, Canada and the United States.

Just before 10 a.m. as she was sailing east of the Kish Bank in a heavy swell, passengers saw a torpedo approach from the port side and pass in front of the bow. A second torpedo followed shortly afterwards, and struck the ship forward on the port side, in the vicinity of the mail room. The ship made a U-turn in an attempt to return to Kingstown as it began to settle slowly by the bow, but sank rapidly after a third torpedo struck, causing a huge explosion.

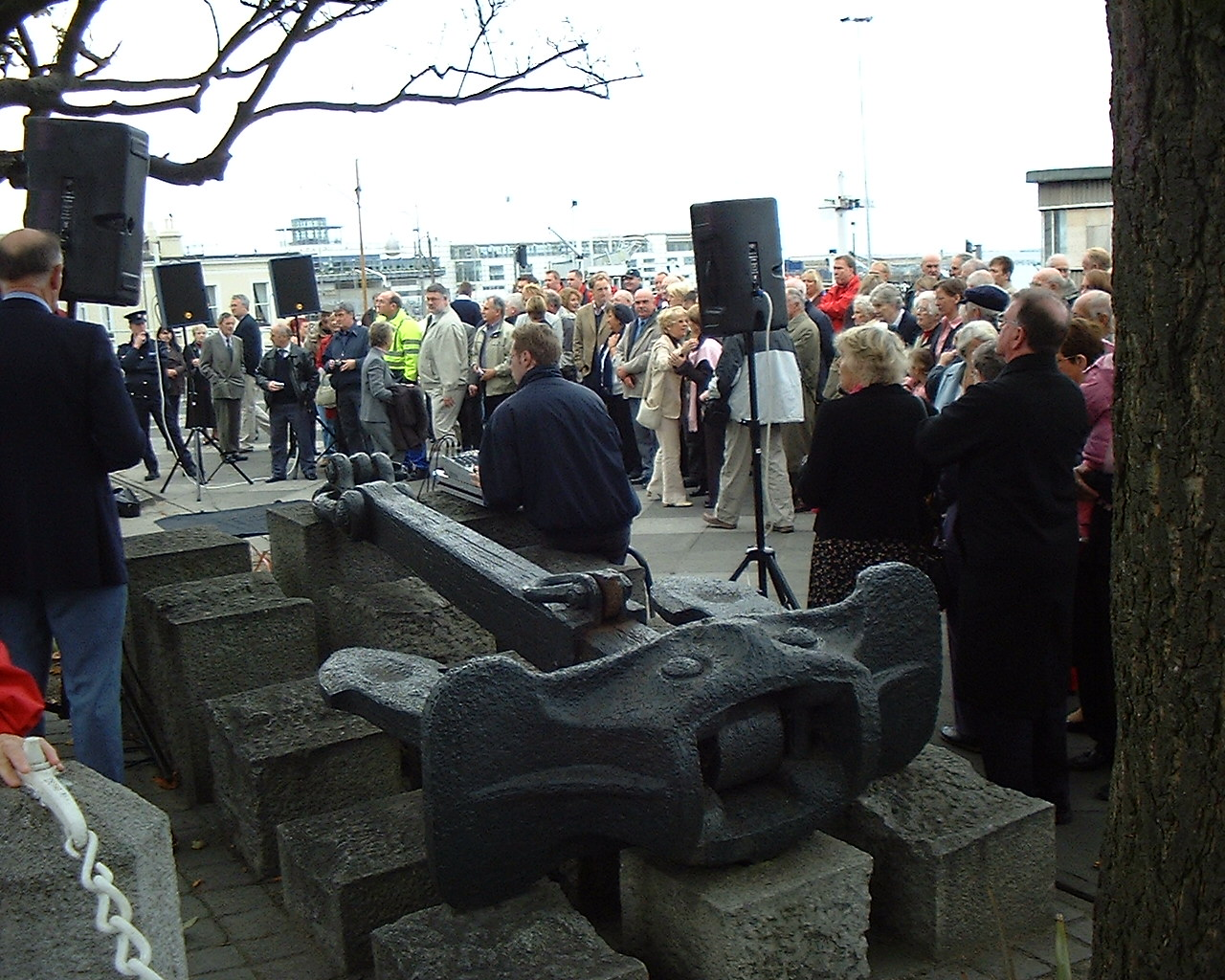
Leinster's Anchor – Carlisle Pier, Dún Laoghaire, adjacent to the National Maritime Museum of Ireland.

Despite the heavy seas, the crew managed to launch several lifeboats and some passengers clung to life-rafts. The survivors were rescued by HMS Lively, HMS Mallard and HMS Seal. Among the civilian passengers lost in the sinking were socially prominent people, such as Lady Phyllis Hamilton, daughter of the Duke of Abercorn, Robert Jocelyn Alexander, son of Irish poet and hymn writer, Cecil Frances Alexander, Rev. John Bartley, the Presbyterian minister of Tralee, who was travelling to visit his mortally wounded son in hospital, Thomas Foley and his wife Charlotte Foley (née Barrett), who was the brother-in-law of the world-famous Irish tenor John McCormack, who adopted their eldest son, and Richard Moore, only son of British architect Temple Moore. The first member of the Women's Royal Naval Service to die on active duty, Josephine Carr, was among those who died, as were two prominent officials of the Irish Transport and General Workers' Union, James McCarron and Patrick Lynch.

Several of the military personnel who died are buried in Grangegorman Military Cemetery.

Survivors were brought to Kingstown harbour. Among them were Michael Joyce, an Irish Parliamentary Party MP for Limerick City, and Captain Hutchinson Ingham Cone of the United States Navy, the head of U.S. Naval Aviation Forces in Europe.

One of the rescue ships was the armed yacht, and former fishery protection vessel, HMY Helga. Stationed in Kingstown harbour at the time of the sinking, she had shelled Dublin during the 1916 Easter Rising in Dublin two years earlier. She was later bought and renamed Muirchú by the Irish Free State government as one of its first fishery protection vessels.

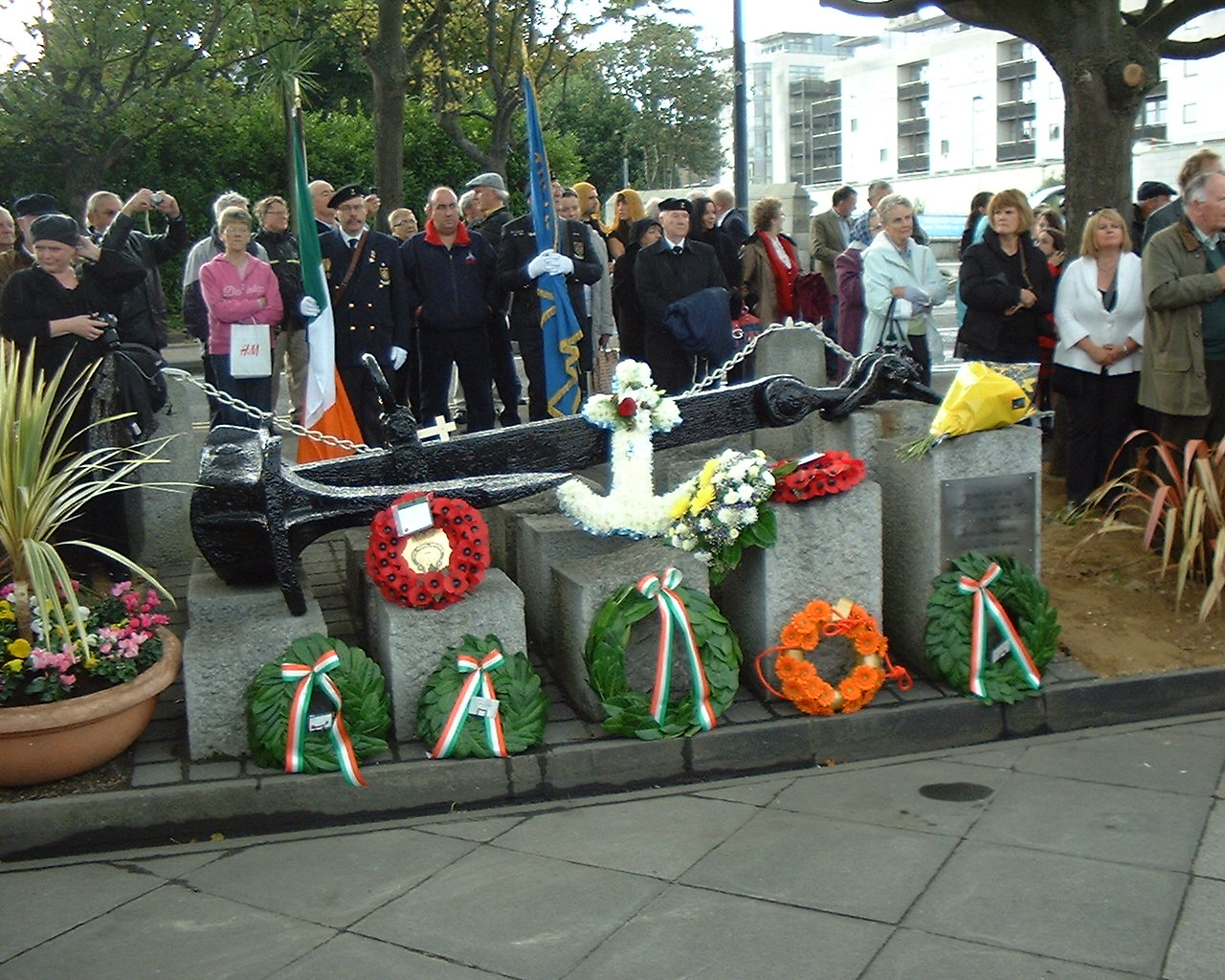
Ninetieth anniversary of the sinking of RMS Leinster

== The last act ==
On 18 October 1918 at 9.10 a.m. UB-125, outbound from Germany under the command of Oberleutnant zur See Werner Vater, picked up a radio message requesting advice on the best way to get through the North Sea minefield. The sender was Oberleutnant zur See Robert Ramm, aboard UB-123. Extra naval mines had been added to the minefield since UB-123 had made her outward voyage from Germany. As UB-125 had just come through the minefield, Vater radioed back with a suggested route. UB-123 acknowledged the message and was never heard from again.

The following day, ten days after the sinking of the RMS Leinster, UB-123 detonated a mine while trying to cross the North Sea and return to base in Imperial Germany. There were no survivors.

== Anchor ==
In 1991, the anchor of RMS Leinster was raised by local divers. It was placed near Carlisle Pier and officially dedicated on 28 January 1996.

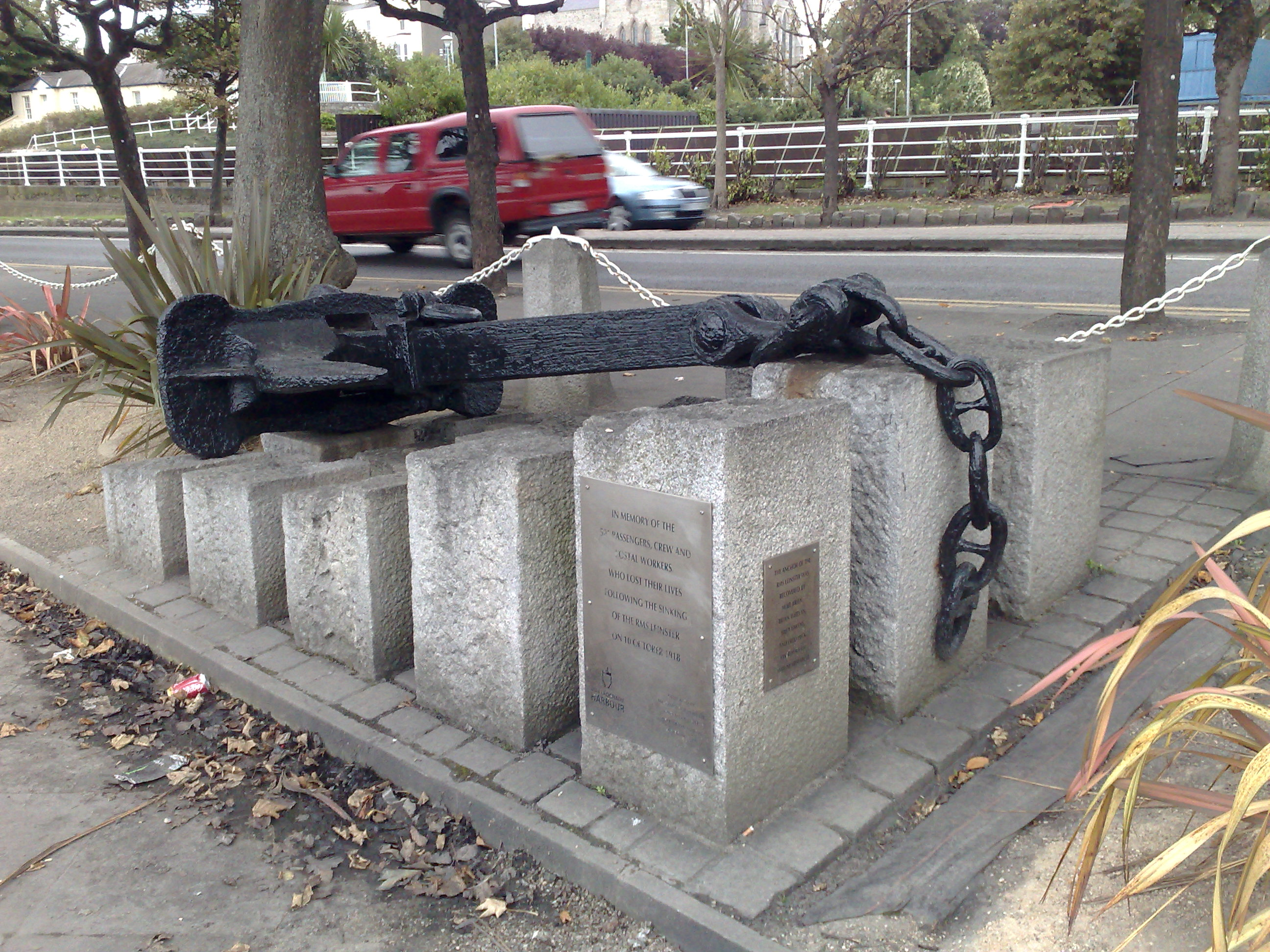
Anchor of RMS Leinster, showing memorial plaques.

== Commemorations ==
=== 2008 commemoration ===
In 2008, 90 years after its sinking, a commemorative stamp was issued by An Post, recalling particularly the Post Office's 21 staff who died in the sinking. The loss of the vessel is further recalled in the postal museum of the General Post Office, in Dublin's O'Connell Street.

=== 2018 centenary commemoration ===
On 10 October 2018 an official commemoration took place in Dún Laoghaire attended by the Minister for Culture, Heritage and the Gaeltacht, Josepha Madigan T.D. in which she confirmed that Leinster is now under the protection of the National Monuments Acts, which covers all shipwrecks over 100 years old.

== See also ==
- Maritime disasters
