= Kish Bank =

Lighthouse in Dublin, Ireland

Kish Bank Lighthouse Banc na Cise
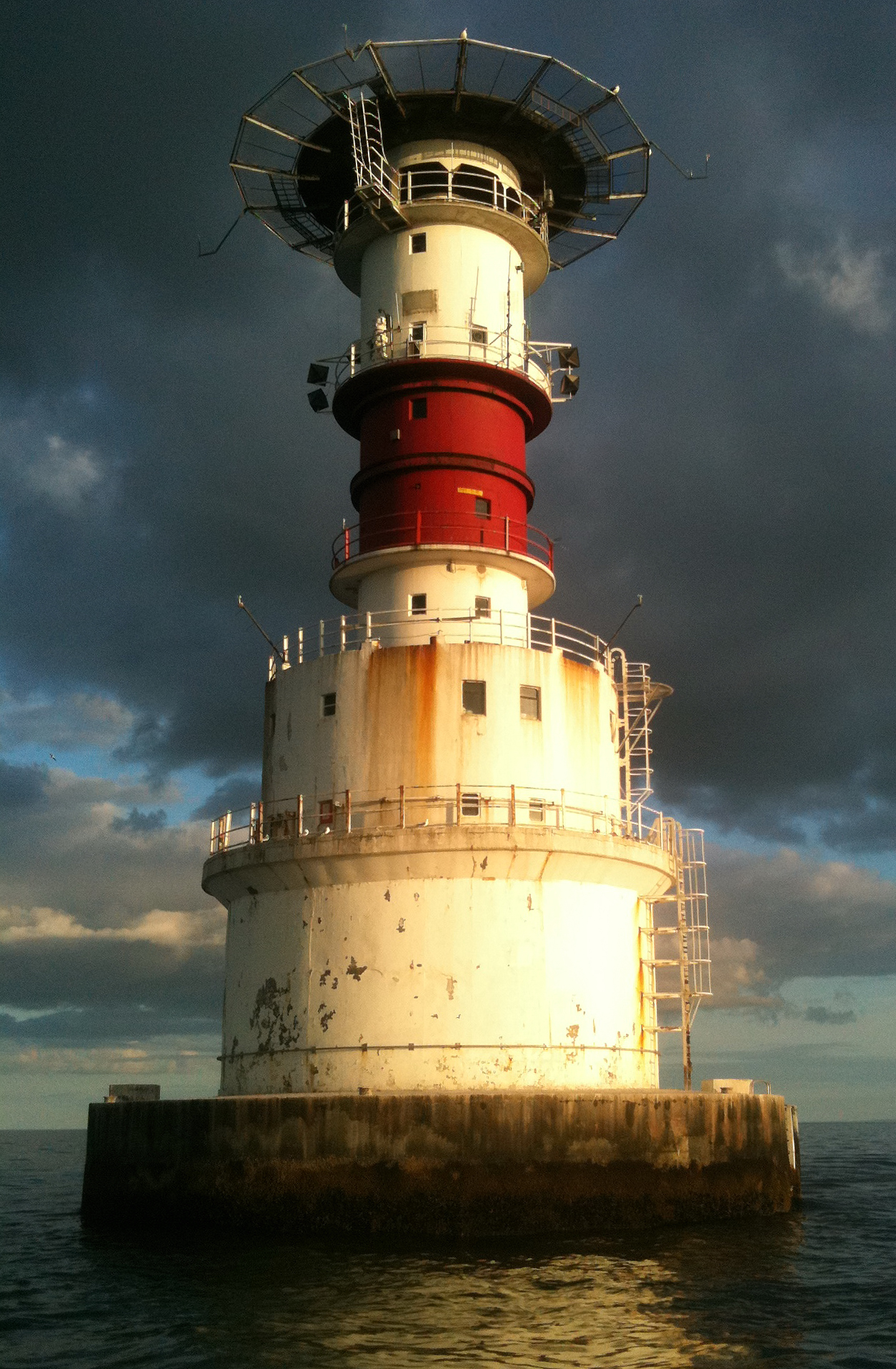
- Kish Bank Lighthouse in 2011
- Location: Kish Bank, County Dublin, Ireland
- Coordinates: 53°18′39″N 5°55′33″W

Tower
- Constructed: July 1963
- Construction: reinforced concrete
- Automated: 7 April 1992
- Height: 31 m (102 ft)
- Shape: telescopic cylindrical tower with four balconies, lantern and helipad
- Markings: White (tower), red (stripe)
- Operator: Commissioners of Irish Lights
- Racon: T

Light
- First lit: 9 November 1965
- Focal height: 29 m (95 ft)
- Lens: catoptric lens
- Intensity: 2,000,000 candela
- Range: 22 nmi (41 km; 25 mi)
- Characteristic: Fl(2) W 20s
- Ireland no.: CIL-0850

The Kish Bank (Irish: Banc na Cise) is a shallow sand bank approximately 11 kilometres (7 mi) off the coast of Dublin, in Ireland. It is marked by the Kish Lighthouse, a landmark visible to sailors and ferry passengers passing through Dublin Bay and Dún Laoghaire harbour.

Many ships were wrecked on these shallows. The Vesper was lost in January 1876; the Norwegian MV Bolivar ran aground on the Kish Bank during a snow storm on 4 March 1947; both wrecks are frequently dived. A mailboat operated by the City of Dublin Steam Packet Company between Kingstown (now Dún Laoghaire) and Holyhead, RMS Leinster, was torpedoed and sunk by a German submarine on 10 October 1918. She went down four miles (6.4 km) east of the Kish light with over 500 lives lost, the greatest single loss of life in the Irish Sea. Fifty-five wrecks are listed for the Kish Bank area.

== Lighthouse ==
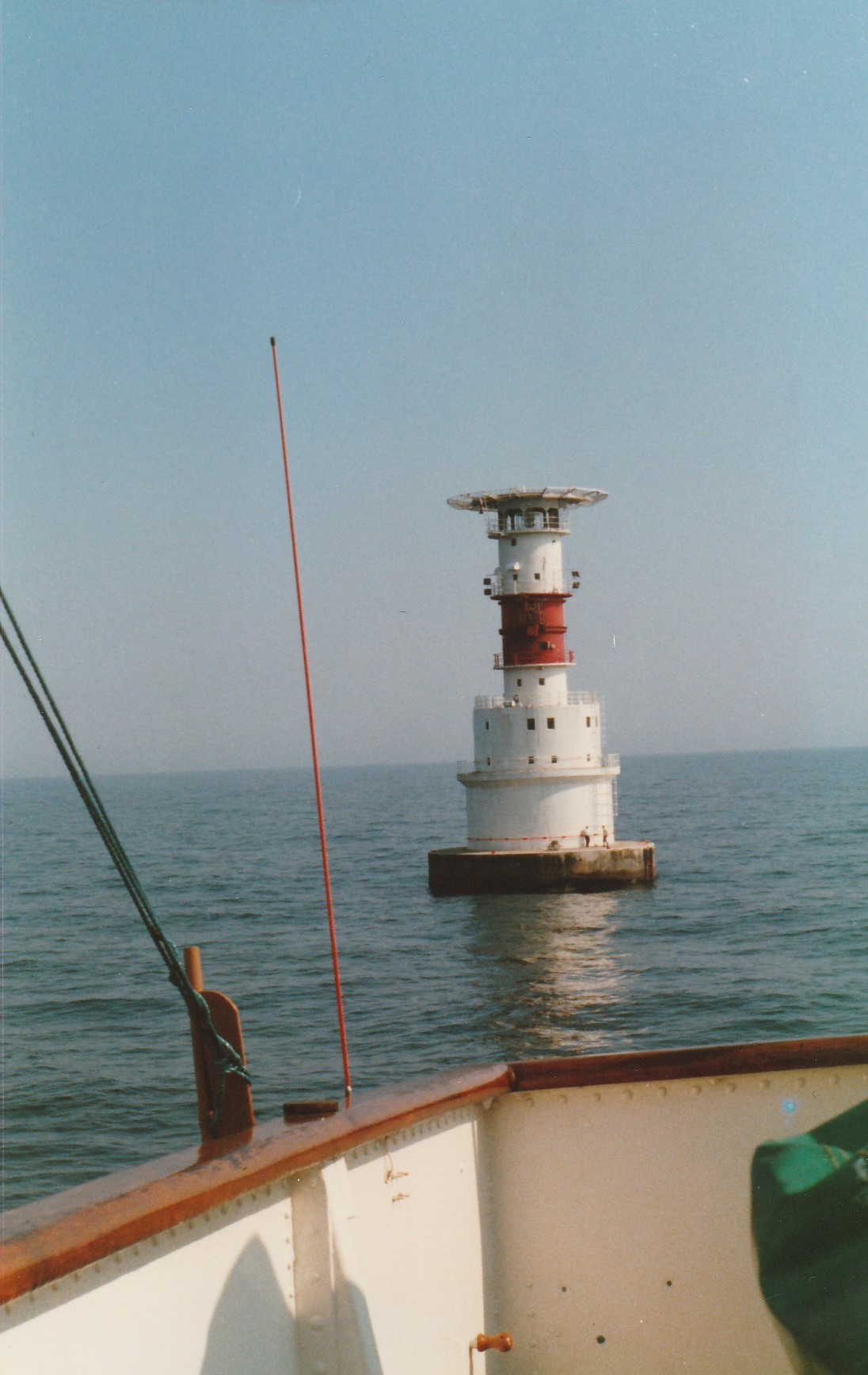
The lighthouse in 1987

Before the present Kish lighthouse was installed in 1965, the sandbank had been marked by a lightvessel since 1811. An attempt to build a lighthouse in 1842 was abandoned following the destruction caused by severe weather. The first Irish electric light vessel, Gannet, was installed in 1954.

The Commissioners of Irish Lights decided in 1960 to erect a reinforced concrete lighthouse with a helicopter landing pad on top, designed by Christiani & Nielsen. The sand bank was bored in 1961 and a seismic survey revealed about 300 feet (91 m) of sand at the site. Construction began in 1963 in the Coal Harbour of Dún Laoghaire, but the first section of the lighthouse cracked while it was being built and had to be discarded. The second telescopic lighthouse was completed and towed out to the sandbank on 29 June 1965. The tower was raised on 27 July 1965 to its full height of 100 feet (30 m), with twelve floors inside, and with a 32-foot (9.8 m)-wide helicopter platform on top. It had a projected lifetime of 75 years.

The new lighthouse took over from the previous light vessel on 9 November 1965. The lighthouse operates at a candlepower of between two and three million, depending on visibility conditions, and the beam is visible for 27 nmi (50 km). The lighthouse was automated on 7 April 1992, and the keepers came ashore.

In July 2018, Cunningham Civil & Marine undertook an overhaul of the site, including repainting and the upgrading of helicopter netting.

== Proposed windfarm ==
In late 1999, the Department of Marine and Natural Resources awarded licenses to allow studies to be carried out on the Kish and Bray Banks in relation to the construction of a proposed offshore wind farm. Press reports at the time suggested that 100 or more wind turbines could be erected. As of March 2001, it was reported that the ESB Group had been afforded a foreshore licence to undertake related surveys.

By late 2020, the proposed development (titled the "Dublin Array" project) was associated with the Irish company Saorgus Energy and German energy company RWE. In December 2022, the Department of the Environment granted 'Maritime Area Consent' (MAC) to RWE and Saorgus Energy, to progress the Dublin Array wind farm, to be "located on the Kish Bank and Bray Bank, roughly 10km off the coast of south Co Dublin and Co Wicklow". If built as planned it would "comprise between 45 and 61 wind turbines with capacity to generate between 600 and 900 megawatts of renewable energy". A planning application was submitted to An Bord Pleanála in February 2025.

== See also ==
- List of islands of Ireland
- Coastal landforms of Ireland
- List of lighthouses in Ireland
- Commissioners of Irish Lights
