= SS Cork =

History
- Name: Cork
- Namesake: Cork (city)
- Owner: City of Dublin Steam Packet Company
- Port of registry: Dublin, Ireland (United Kingdom of Great Britain and Ireland)
- Route: Dublin – Liverpool
- Builder: Blackwood & Gordon
- Yard number: 242
- Completed: 1899
- Acquired: 1899
- In service: 1899
- Out of service: 26 January 1918
- Identification: RFLK; Official number: 111023
- Fate: Torpedoed and sunk on 26 January 1918

General characteristics
- Type: Passenger ship
- Tonnage: 1,232 GRT
- Length: 79.3 m (260 ft 2 in)
- Beam: 10.4 m (34 ft 1 in)
- Depth: 4.8 m (15 ft 9 in)
- Installed power: Triple expansion engine with 2 boilers
- Speed: 10.5 knots (19.4 km/h; 12.1 mph)
- Crew: 35

SS Cork was an Irish passenger ship that was torpedoed by the German submarine SM U-103 in the Irish Sea nine nautical miles (17 km; 10 mi) north east of Point Lynas, Anglesey (53°34′N 4°14′W) on 26 January 1918 while on route from Dublin, Ireland to Liverpool, United Kingdom while carrying a general cargo of sheep, horses, and cattle.

== Construction ==
Cork was built at the Blackwood & Gordon shipyard in Glasgow, Scotland, United Kingdom and completed in 1899. The ship was 79.3 metres (260 ft 2 in) long, had a beam of 10.4 metres (34 ft 1 in) and a depth of 4.8 metres (15 ft 9 in). It was assessed at 1,232 gross register tons (GRT) and was powered by a triple expansion engine fed steam by two boilers. The ship could reach a speed of 10.5 knots (19.4 km/h; 12.1 mph) and could generate 399 nhp.

== Sinking ==
Cork was travelling along her normal route from Dublin, Ireland to Liverpool, United Kingdom while carrying a general cargo of sheep, horses, and cattle alongside 35 passengers and crew on 26 January 1918. The ship had been defensively armed to protect her against a possible German U-boat attack. This attack came that day between 1 and 2 am, when the ship was nine nautical miles (17 km; 10 mi) north east of Point Lynas, Anglesey. Cork was struck by two torpedoes on her port side from the German submarine SM U-103, the first hit the engine room and the second struck near the foremast, destroying one of the lifeboats. Following the attack, the bow of the ship caught fire as she began to sink rapidly. The crew, under the command of the chief officer, only had time to launch two lifeboats as Cork disappeared beneath the waves barely five minutes after the first torpedo impact. Seven passengers and five crew died from among the 35 people on board. The 23 survivors in the lifeboats, were picked up by SS New Pioneer at 5 am and transferred to another ship which brought them ashore at Pembrokeshire, Wales.

== Wreck ==
The wreck of Cork lies at 53°34′N 4°14′W in an upright position and is largely intact, lying at a depth of 48 metres (157 ft).
