= R806 road (Ireland) =

Road in Ireland

R806 road
- Bóthar R806
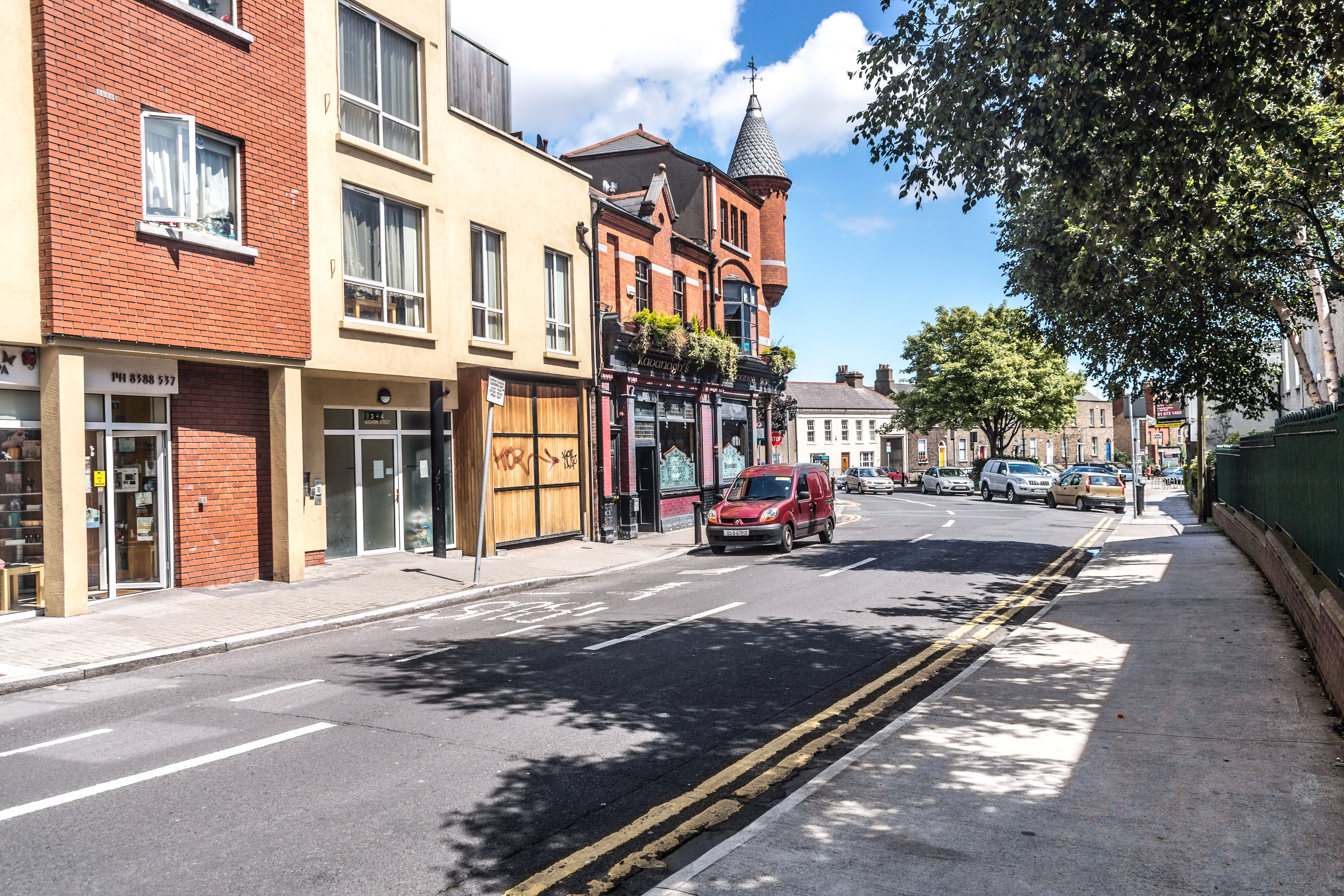
- Aughrim Street, on the R806

Location
- Country: Ireland
- Primary destinations: Dublin

Highway system
- Roads in Ireland; Motorways; Primary; Secondary; Regional

The R806 road is a regional road in Dublin, Ireland.

The official definition of the R806 from the Roads Act 1993 (Classification of Regional Roads) Order 2006 states:

R806: Blanchardstown - Manor Street, Dublin

Between its junction with N3 at Blanchardstown Bypass in the county of Fingal and its junction with R805 at Manor Street in the city of Dublin via Navan Road and Castleknock Road in the county of Fingal: Blackhorse Avenue and Aughrim Street in the city of Dublin.

== Discovery of Rudo Mawere's body ==
On the morning of 29 January 2012 a woman's body was discovered in a large holdall bag in front of a house on Saint David's Terrace, a short distance from Blackhorse Avenue and McKee Barracks. The scene was sealed off and the State Pathologist was alerted. It was believed her body was deliberately dumped near bins in the hope it would be collected as rubbish. Later that day the Gardaí identified the woman as a Malawian student who was in her 20s and had died by asphyxiation, but would not officially name the victim until her relatives have been informed. Two days later the victim was identified as 26 year old care worker Rudo Mawere who had been living on Leinster Road, Rathmines. That same day Gardaí searched a house in Aughrim Street, Stoneybatter, a short distance away, where her boyfriend lived and which had been linked in connection with her murder. On 1 February 2012 the main suspect in her murder, a Zimbabwean national, was found dead in a Kent wood by a dog walker. It was believed the man left the country through Northern Ireland and had travelled onwards by ferry to Britain.

== See also ==
- Roads in Ireland
- National primary road
- Regional road
