= City of Dublin Steam Packet Company =

Shipping line

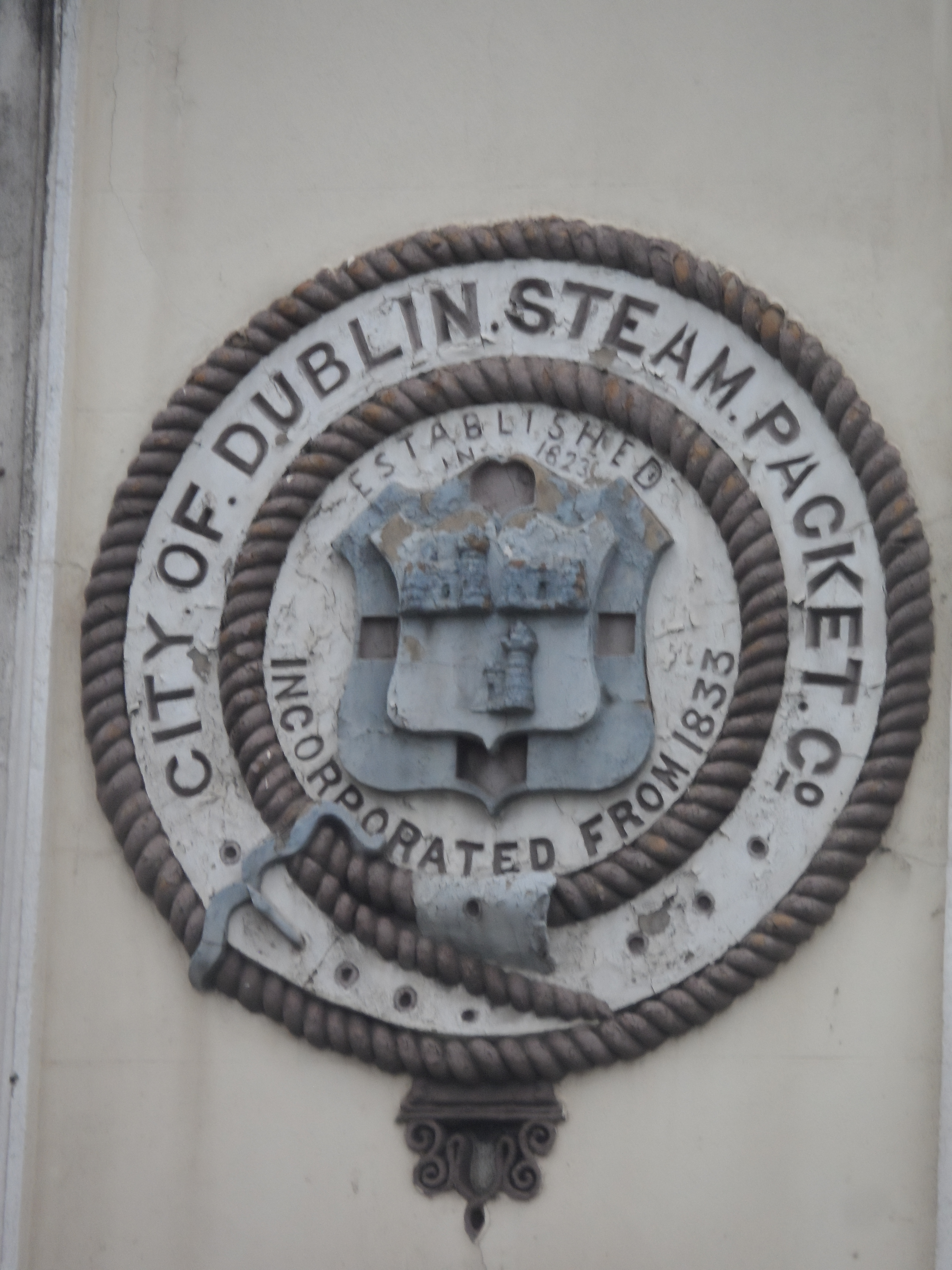
City of Dublin Steam Packet Company logo, still visible on a wall on Eden Quay.

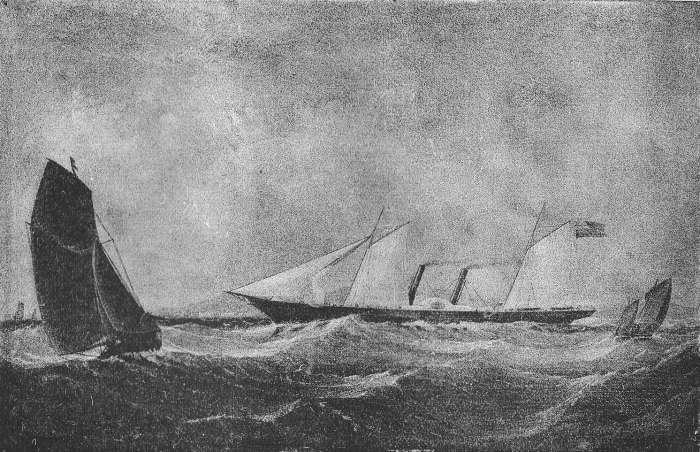
RMS Prince Arthur of 1851, depicted in the book A Hundred Years by Post by J. Wilson Hyde.

House flag.

The City of Dublin Steam Packet Company was a shipping line established in 1823. It served cross-channel routes between Britain and Ireland for over a century. For 70 of those years it transported the mail. It was 'wound-up' by a select committee of the House of Lords in 1922 and finally liquidated in 1930.

The company operated from offices at Eden House, 15-18 Eden Quay which were constructed in 1829.

== History ==
City of Dublin Steam Packet Company Act 1833
- Act of Parliament
- Parliament of the United Kingdom
- Long title: An Act to amend an Act passed in the Ninth Year of the Reign of His late Majesty, for regulating and enabling the City of Dublin Steam Packet Company to sue and be sued.
- Citation: 3 & 4 Will. 4. c. cxv
- Territorial extent: United Kingdom

Dates
- Royal assent: 24 July 1833
- Commencement: 24 July 1833 (Note: The Acts of Parliament (Commencement) Act 1793.)
- Repealed: 31 January 2013

Other legislation
- Repeals/revokes: City of Dublin Steam Packet Company Act 1828
- Repealed by: Statute Law (Repeals) Act 2013

Status: Repealed

Text of statute as originally enacted

The City of Dublin Steam Packet Company began in Dublin in 1822 as Charles Wye Williams & Company; Williams is one of the unrecognised pioneers of steam navigation. His company initially operated steam ships between Dublin and Liverpool. In 1826, the line added service to London and Belfast. Later, service was also provided between Glasgow and Belfast. Transatlantic service to New York started with the Royal William departing Liverpool on 5 July 1838, becoming the first steamer to depart for an Atlantic crossing from the River Mersey. In January, 1839, they were awarded a contract to provide a night mail service from Holyhead; their ships docked at the Admiralty Pier in Holyhead. In 1843, the company took over the routes of the St. George Steam Packet Company, extending service to Wales. The Company also operated smaller steamers on the River Shannon.

Up until 1850, the British Admiralty carried the Royal Mail, but in that year, contracts were awarded for the first time to private companies. Ships carrying mail on these contracts were authorized to use the designation RMS or Royal Mail Ship. The most valuable route, with the highest volume, was between Kingstown (now Dún Laoghaire), in Ireland, and Holyhead in Wales. The line won the contract and purchased RMS Saint Columba and RMS Llwywllyn from the Admiralty. In 1859, the line ordered four additional steamers, named for four provinces of Ireland, the RMS Connaught, RMS Leinster, RMS Munster and RMS Ulster; these four were commonly referred to as "The Provinces".

In 1897, the line was awarded an additional 21 years for their contract with the Post Office, the CofDSPCo ordered four identical ships from Cammell Lairds of Birkenhead to replace "The Provinces"; these carried the same names as the former ships. These were twin-propeller vessels powered by an eight-cylinder steam engine, capable of 24 knots.

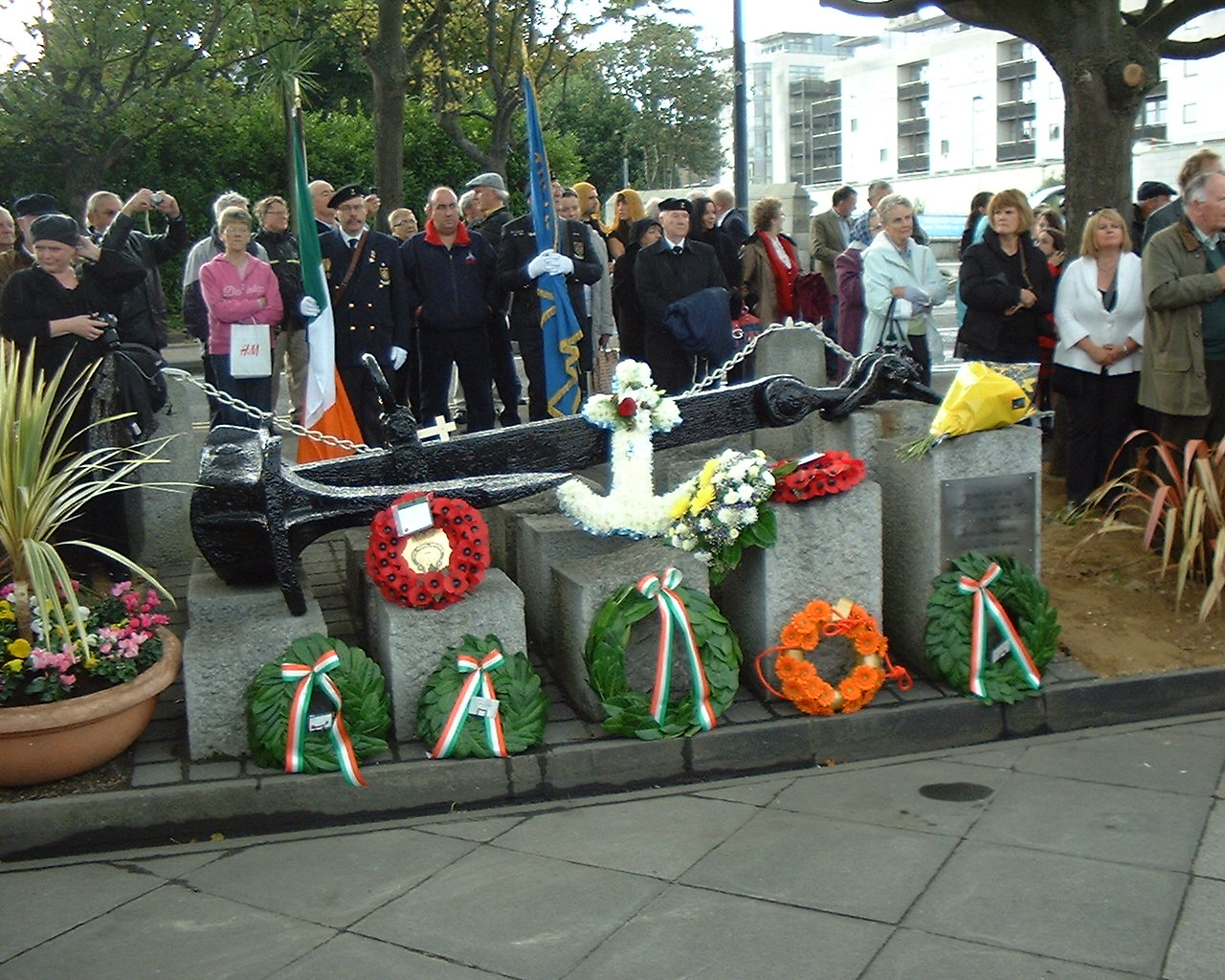
90th anniversary of the sinking of RMS Leinster

During World War I, the company lost two steamers sunk by the Germans, the worst of which was the second Leinster which was lost with over 500 lives in 30 metres of water just North East of the Kish Light, the greatest single-incident loss of life in the Irish Sea. (The official death toll was 501. Research by Roy Stokes, author of Death in the Irish Sea: The Sinking of RMS Leinster and Philip Lecane, author of Torpedoed! The RMS Leinster Disaster suggest that the number lost was somewhat higher.) The Company was not able to financially recover from this loss. Afterwards, the remaining fleet were taken over by the British & Irish Steam Packet Company. The City of Dublin Steam Packet Company was finally liquidated in 1924.

== Ships operated by the line ==
- Albert 1845
- Athlone 1836 (in 1849, Thomas Carlyle sailed to Dublin from London on the Athlone. He gives a lengthy description of his three-day sail from London to Dublin Harbour. The Athlone stopped at Greenwich; Gravesend; Broadstairs; Ramsgate; Deal; Dover' Plymouth and Falmouth before heading out to Ireland. Carlyle. Reminiscences of My Irish Journey in 1849, 1882, pp. 7-37.
- Ballinasloe 1829
- Banshee 1848
- Belfast 1884
- Britannia 1825
- Carlow 1896
- Cavan 1876
- City of Dublin 1824
- City of Londonderry 1824
- Commerce 1825
- Connaught (1) 1860
- RMS Connaught (2) 1897 (torpedoed and sunk en route Le Havre to Southampton, 1917)
- Cork 1899 (torpedoed and sunk off Point Lynas, 1918)
- Diamond 1846
- Duchess of Kent 1837
- Duke of Cambridge 1837
- Eblana 1849
- Emerald 1846
- Galway 1891
- Gipsy 1828
- Hibernia 1824
- Ireland 1885
- Iron Duke 1844
- Kerry 1897
- Kildare 1867
- Kilkenny 1903
- Leeds 1826
- Leinster (1) 1860
- RMS Leinster (2) 1897 (torpedoed and sunk off Kingstown, 1918; over 500 lives lost out of 771 onboard)
- Leitrim 1874
- Liffey 1824
- Liverpool 1846
- RMS Llewellyn 1848
- Longford 1870
- Louth 1894
- Manchester 1826
- Mayo 1880
- Meath 1884
- Mersey 1824
- Mona (1) 1825
- Mona (2) 1832
- Mullingar 1868
- Munster (1) 1860
- Munster (2) 1896
- Nottingham 1827
- Pearl 1845
- Prince Arthur 1851
- Princess 1839
- Queen Victoria 1838 (wrecked near Howth Head in snowstorm, 15 February 1853; 80 lives lost)
- Roscommon 1845
- Royal Adelaide 1838 (wrecked at Tongue Sands off Margate, 1849; 250 lives lost)
- Royal William 1837
- Shamrock 1824
- Sheffield 1827
- RMS St. Columba 1848
- St. Patrick (see Llewellyn)
- Thames 1827
- Town of Liverpool 1824
- Trafalgar 1848

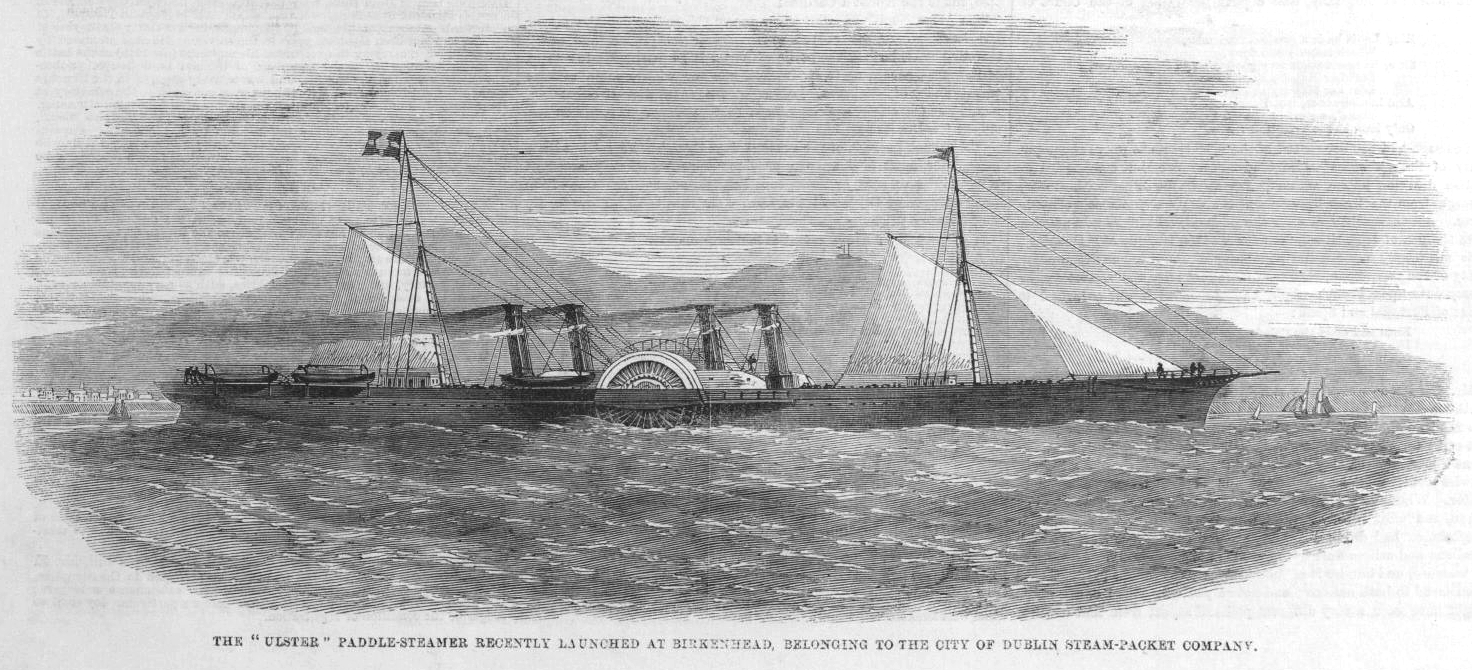
The Ulster Paddle-Steamer launched at Birkenhead. Illustrated London News 1860

- Ulster (1) 1860
- Ulster (2) 1896
- SS Lady Wicklow 1895
- Windsor 1846

== See also ==
- British and Irish Steam Packet Company - operated from offices at 27 Sir John Rogerson's Quay and 46 East Wall and North Wall Quay. It was previously called the Dublin & London Steam Packet Company.
- Dublin & Glasgow Steam Packet Company - operated from offices at 73 North Wall Quay
