= Thomas Ricketts (VC) =

Newfoundland soldier and recipient of the Victoria Cross

Sergeant Thomas Ricketts VC
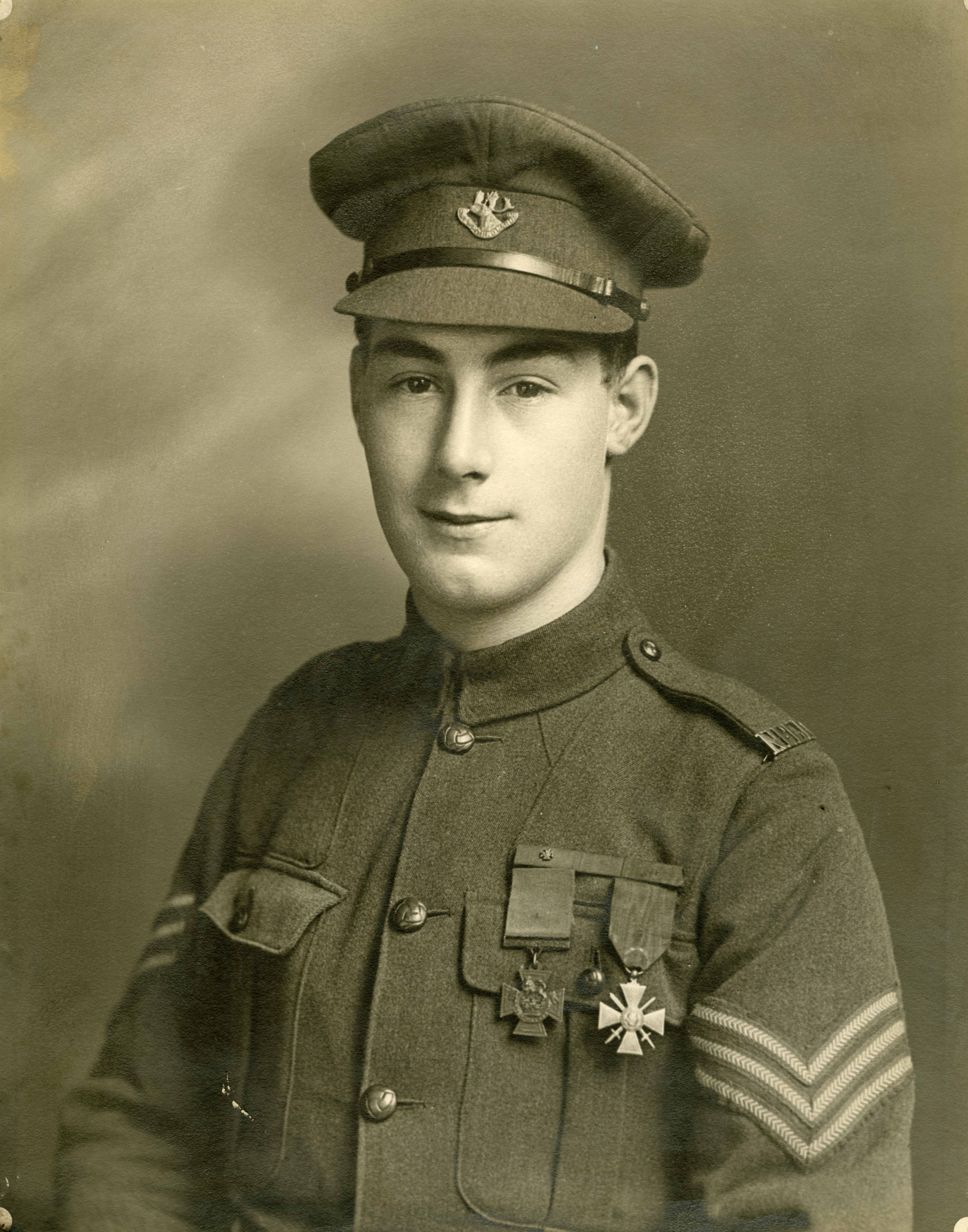
- Thomas Ricketts after being awarded the VC.
- Born: April 15, 1901; Middle Arm, White Bay, Newfoundland Colony
- Died: February 10, 1967 (aged 65); St. John's, Newfoundland and Labrador, Canada
- Burial place: St. John's, Newfoundland and Labrador
- Military career
- Allegiance: Newfoundland
- Branch: British Army
- Service years: 1916–1919
- Rank: Sergeant
- Nickname: Tommy
- Service number: No. 3102
- Units: Royal Newfoundland Regiment: 1st Battalion
- Conflicts: World War I: Western Front
- Awards: Victoria Cross; British War Medal; Victory Medal; Croix de Guerre
- Other work: Pharmacist

Thomas Ricketts VC (April 15, 1901 – February 10, 1967) was a Newfoundland soldier and recipient of the Victoria Cross, the highest and most prestigious award for gallantry in the face of the enemy that can be awarded to British and Commonwealth forces. At age 17, Ricketts is the youngest VC recipient enrolled in an army in a combatant role.

== Victoria Cross ==
Ricketts, who was 17 years old and a private in the 1st Battalion, Royal Newfoundland Regiment during the First World War, was cited in the London Gazette for his actions on October 14, 1918.

"During the advance from Ledeghem (Belgium) the attack was temporarily held up by heavy hostile fire, and the platoon to which he belonged suffered severe casualties from the fire of a battery at point blank range. Private Ricketts at once volunteered to go forward with his Section Commander and a Lewis gun to attempt to outflank the battery. They advanced by short rushes while subject to severe fire from enemy machine guns. When 300 yards away, their ammunition gave out. The enemy, seeing an opportunity to get their field guns away, began to bring up their gun teams. Private Ricketts at once realized the situation. He doubled back 100 yards, procured some ammunition and dashed back to the Lewis gun, and by very accurate fire drove the enemy and their gun teams into a farm. His platoon then advanced without casualties, and captured four field guns, four machine guns and eight prisoners. A fifth field gun was subsequently intercepted by fire and captured. By his presence of mind in anticipating the enemy intention and his utter disregard for personal safety, Private Ricketts secured the further supplies of ammunition which directly resulted in these important captures and undoubtedly saved many lives"

— London Gazette 4 January 1919

King George V presented Ricketts with his VC at York Cottage on the Sandringham Estate on January 19, 1919. At the ceremony, the King reportedly stated: "This is the youngest VC in my army." General Dighton Probyn, one of the oldest living VC holders at the time, was also present at the investiture.

While Ricketts is the youngest VC army recipient in a combatant role, he is not the youngest VC recipient. Hospital Apprentice Andrew Fitzgibbon and Drummer Thomas Flinn (who despite strictly being a non-combatant, received his VC for hand-to-hand combat during the Indian Mutiny), both aged 15, were awarded the VC in non-combatant roles. While Ricketts, Fitzgibbon and Flinn were all living VC recipients, Jack Cornwell of the Royal Navy was awarded the VC posthumously for his actions at the Battle of Jutland at age 16.

Ricketts was also awarded France's Croix de Guerre with Golden Star in 1919.

== After the war ==
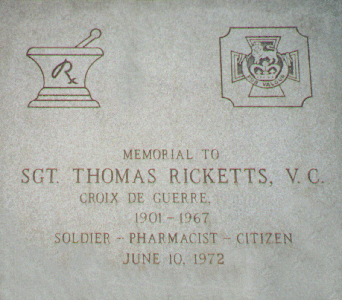
Thomas Ricketts former memorial plaque. (Water Street, St. John's, Newfoundland) Note 'D.C.M.' was inscribed after the C de G, but was an error, cloned out of the image

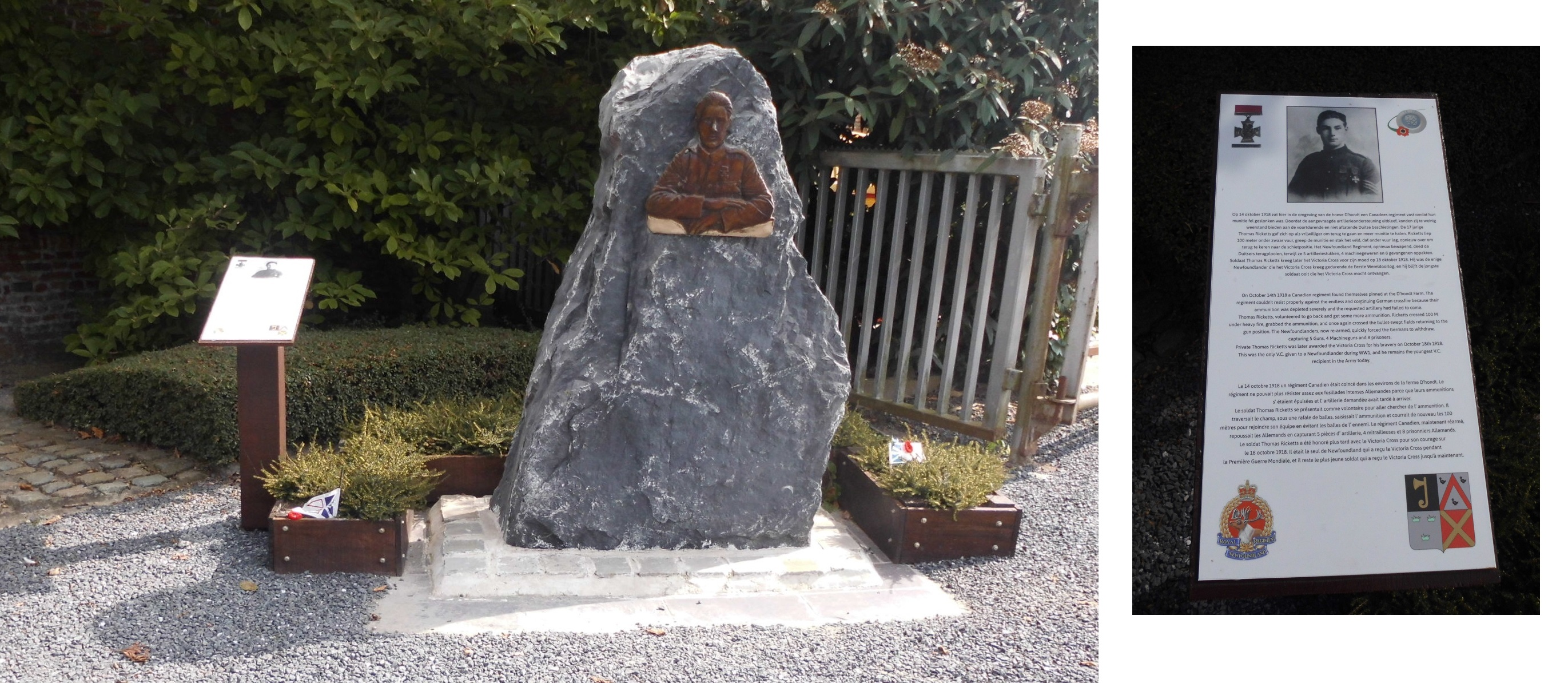
Monument for Ricketts in Sint-Eloois-Winkel, a village near Ledeghem 50°51′38.9″N 003°10′55.8″E

After the war, Ricketts studied pharmacy, and opened a business on Water Street in St. John's. He was the youngest living VC recipient from the time of his award until 1940.

Ricketts was given a state funeral when he died in 1967, and is commemorated by a memorial on the former site of his pharmacy. Ricketts is buried at the Anglican Cemetery, Forest Road, St. John's. Ricketts' medals are on display at The Rooms in St. John's.

Ricketts is sometimes erroneously referred to as having been a Canadian soldier during the First World War. Newfoundland was a self-governing dominion at the time and did not become a province of Canada until 1949.

The sports arena in Baie Verte is named in honour of Ricketts. In 2018, the "Tommy Ricketts Memorial Peace Park" opened in Conception Bay South.

A photo of Ricketts is used on the cover of the 2001 Anchor Canada edition of Pierre Berton's "Vimy" paperback.

== Bibliography ==
- Gliddon, Gerald (2014) [2000]. The Final Days 1918. VCs of the First World War. The History Press. ISBN 978-0-7509-5368-9.
