= Mount Cornwell (Canada) =

Mountain in the country of Canada

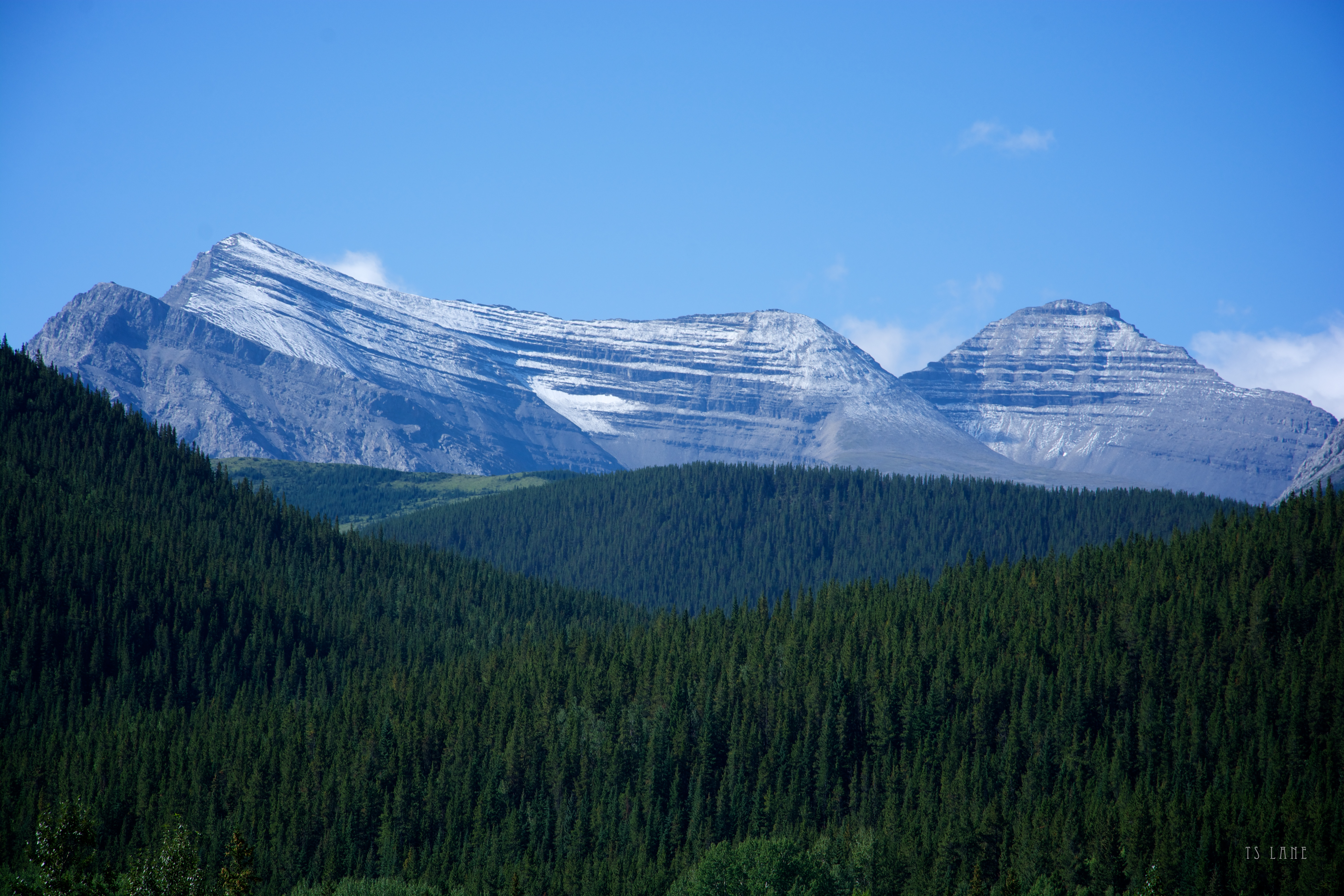
- Baril Peak (left), Mt. Cornwell (right), from NE

Highest point
- Elevation: 2,972 m (9,751 ft)
- Prominence: 176 m (577 ft)
- Listing: Mountains of Alberta
- Coordinates: 50°18′02″N 114°46′53″W

Geography
- Location within Alberta Location within British Columbia Location within Canada
- Location: Alberta/British Columbia, Canada
- Parent range: Kananaskis Range, Front Ranges, Canadian Rockies
- Topo map: NTS 82J7 Mount Head

Climbing
- First ascent: 1915 by the Interprovincial Boundary Commission
- Easiest route: rock/snow climb

Mount Cornwell is located on the Continental Divide on the boundary between British Columbia and Alberta along the spine of the Front Ranges of the Canadian Rockies. The mountain was named in 1918 after "boy hero" John Cornwell, a sixteen-year-old crewman aboard HMS Chester, which was severely damaged in the Battle of Jutland. Cornwell was posthumously awarded the Victoria Cross for his bravery during the battle. Mount Chester was also named after his ship.

== See also ==
- List of peaks on the Alberta–British Columbia border
