= Cornwell Secondary Modern School =

School in Essex, England

Cornwell Secondary Modern School (formerly Walton Road School) was a school in the district of Little Ilford, Essex (now within the London Borough of Newham). It is named after its student Jack Cornwell, one of the youngest recipients of the Victoria Cross.

== History ==
The school opened in 1900 as the Bessborough Road Board School, built by the Little Ilford school board. It was situated on Walton Road, Manor Park, and became called Walton Road School. Jack Cornwell, who won the Victoria Cross at the Battle of Jutland, was a pupil at the school. On 29 July 1916, when Cornwell's body was exhumed and carried by gun carriage from East Ham Town Hall to Manor Park Cemetery, boys from Walton Road School joined the procession. At the school scholars and staff erected a plaque in his memory which was unveiled by Lady Jellicoe, wife of First Sea Lord Admiral J. Jellicoe.

In 1929 the school was renamed Cornwell School and was reorganised for senior boys, senior girls, and infants. After the Second World War, in 1945 the school was again reorganised for secondary boys and junior mixed, and finally in 1957 for secondary boys only. The school closed twelve years later and was demolished in 1969.
