= Fortress Lake =

Fortress Lake may refer to:

- Fortress Lake (Alberta) in Kananaskis Country
- Fortress Lake (British Columbia) in Hamber Provincial Park
