= Cornwell Scout Badge =

Youth gallantry award of The Scout Association of the United Kingdom

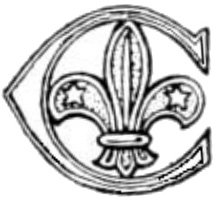
- Owner: The Scout Association
- Founded: 1916
- Founder: The Scout Association
- Awarded for: Pre-eminently high character and devotion to duty, together with great courage and endurance

The Cornwell Scout Badge is a gallantry award of The Scout Association of the United Kingdom and some of its branches in other countries. The award was named in honour of Jack Cornwell, a navy sailor and Scout, who was posthumously awarded the Victoria Cross after he was mortally wounded at the Battle of Jutland in 1916. It is awarded in recognition of devotion to duty, courage and endurance.

== History ==
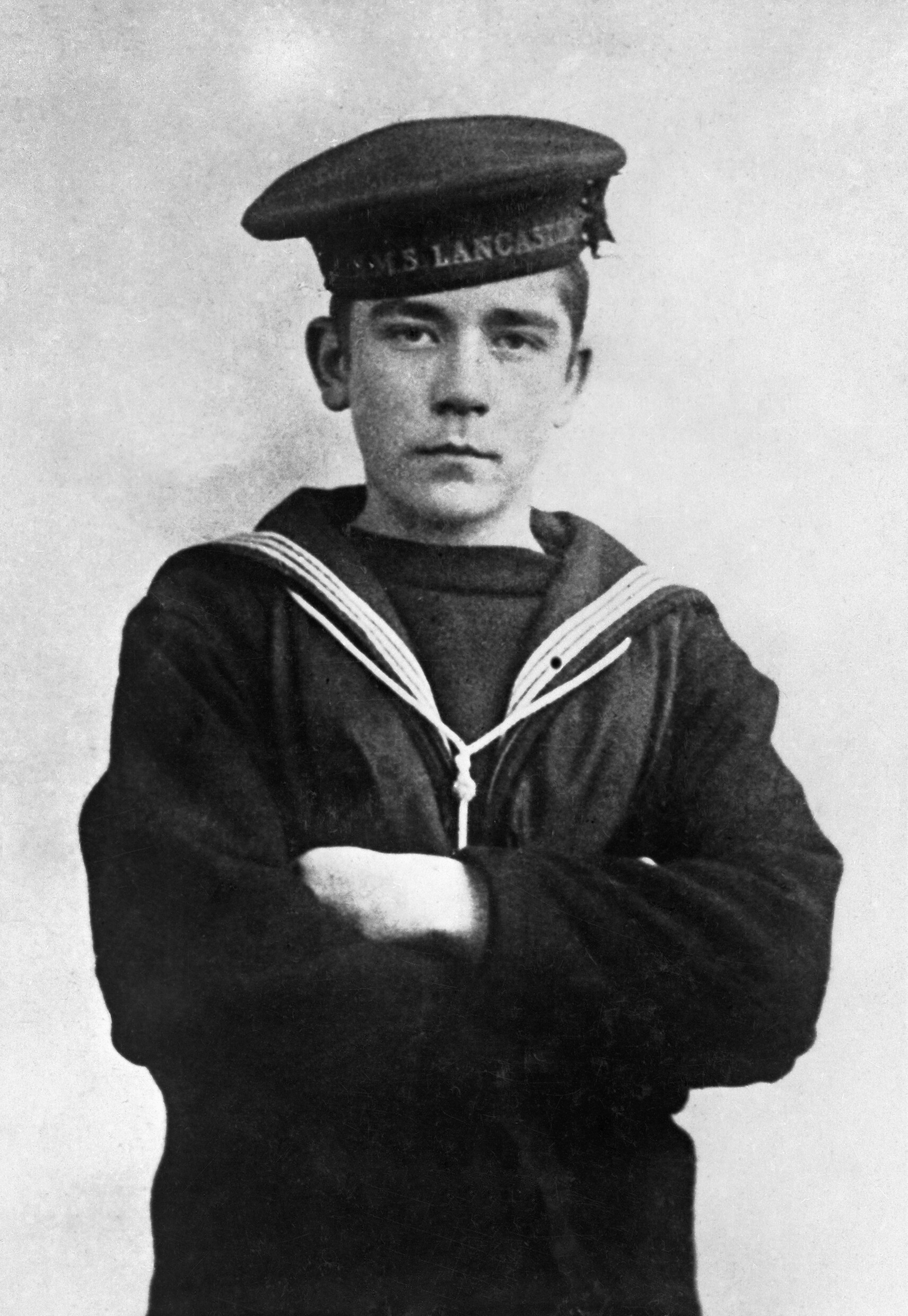
A press photograph of John Travers Cornwell VC, thought to have been posed by his younger brother, George.

John Travers Cornwell, known as "Jack", was a 16-year-old Boy Seaman First Class on board the Royal Navy light cruiser, HMS Chester. At the Battle of Jutland on 31 May 1916, Chester came under heavy fire from four German cruisers that she had encountered in poor visibility, incurring numerous casualties among the exposed crew members working the guns. Jack's captain later wrote; "Boy (1st Class) John Travers Cornwell of the Chester was mortally wounded early in the action. He nevertheless remained standing alone at a most exposed post, quietly awaiting orders till the end of the action, with the gun's crew dead and wounded all round him".

Following Jack's death in Grimsby on 2 June, the Daily Sketch newspaper reported that he had been buried in a mass grave near his family home in Manor Park, Essex (now Greater London). The press coverage ensured that Jack became a popular hero; his body was exhumed and re-buried with full military honours on 29 July and he was awarded the Victoria Cross on 15 September.

Because Jack Cornwell had been an enthusiastic member of his local Scout troop, Scouts had participated in his funeral procession and lined the route. The Boy Scouts Association posthumously awarded Jack its Bronze Cross, Scouting's "highest possible award for gallantry". In August 1916, The Boy Scouts Association established a "Cornwell Memorial Fund" to provide apprenticeships or scholarships to those who qualified as "Cornwell Scouts" and suggested a donation of one penny from each scout and supporters. On 14 September, The Boy Scouts Association announced a Cornwell Scout Badge, to earn which, boys had to be First Class Scouts, have earned certain key proficiency badges and have gained an award for bravery or "have undergone great suffering in a heroic manner". A short-lived alternative to these last requirements was to "pass a test in physical courage, such as high diving, boxing or gymnastics".

The first recipient of the Cornwell Scout Badge was Patrol Leader Arthur Shepherd, who had assisted the Coastguard during the wreck of the hospital ship HMHS Rohilla in a severe gale at Whitby in October 1914. His duties had included running messages and fetching rescue equipment along a steep narrow ledge, on a cliff that was being washed by high waves. He had also led his patrol in assisting the Coastguard during the German bombardment of Whitby in December of the same year. The badge, the manufacturer's sample and only one in existence at the time, was presented by The Boy Scouts Association's head, Baden-Powell at a rally in Middlesbrough in December 1916, in front of 3,000 Boy Scouts and the Archbishop of York.

== Current usage ==
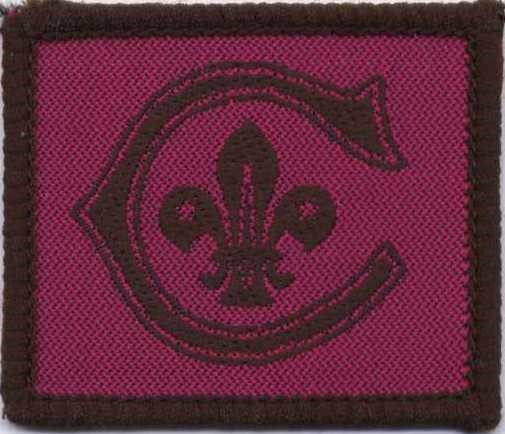
The current Cornwell Scout Badge of the Scout Association.

In The Scout Association of the United Kingdom, the award of the Cornwell Scout Badge is restricted to Beaver Scouts, Cub Scouts, Scouts, Explorer Scouts and Scout Network Members. Candidates must have displayed "pre-eminently high character and devotion to duty, together with great courage and endurance". In 2013, four British members were awarded the Cornwell Scout Badge (one posthumously), out of a total youth membership of 433,850.

The Cornwell Memorial Fund still operates but with altered purpose and makes grants to the Scout Groups of recipients of any of the Scout gallantry or meritorious awards, including recipients of the Cornwell Scout Badge, "in order that they can undertake an activity which involves and benefits both parties."

In Scouts Canada, The Jack Cornwell Decoration is awarded on very similar criteria to its British counterpart. In Scouts New Zealand, the Cornwell Scout Badge is available to youth members under the age of 19 years, the upper age limit of the Venturer Section.
