= The Fortress (Alberta) =

Mountain in Alberta, Canada

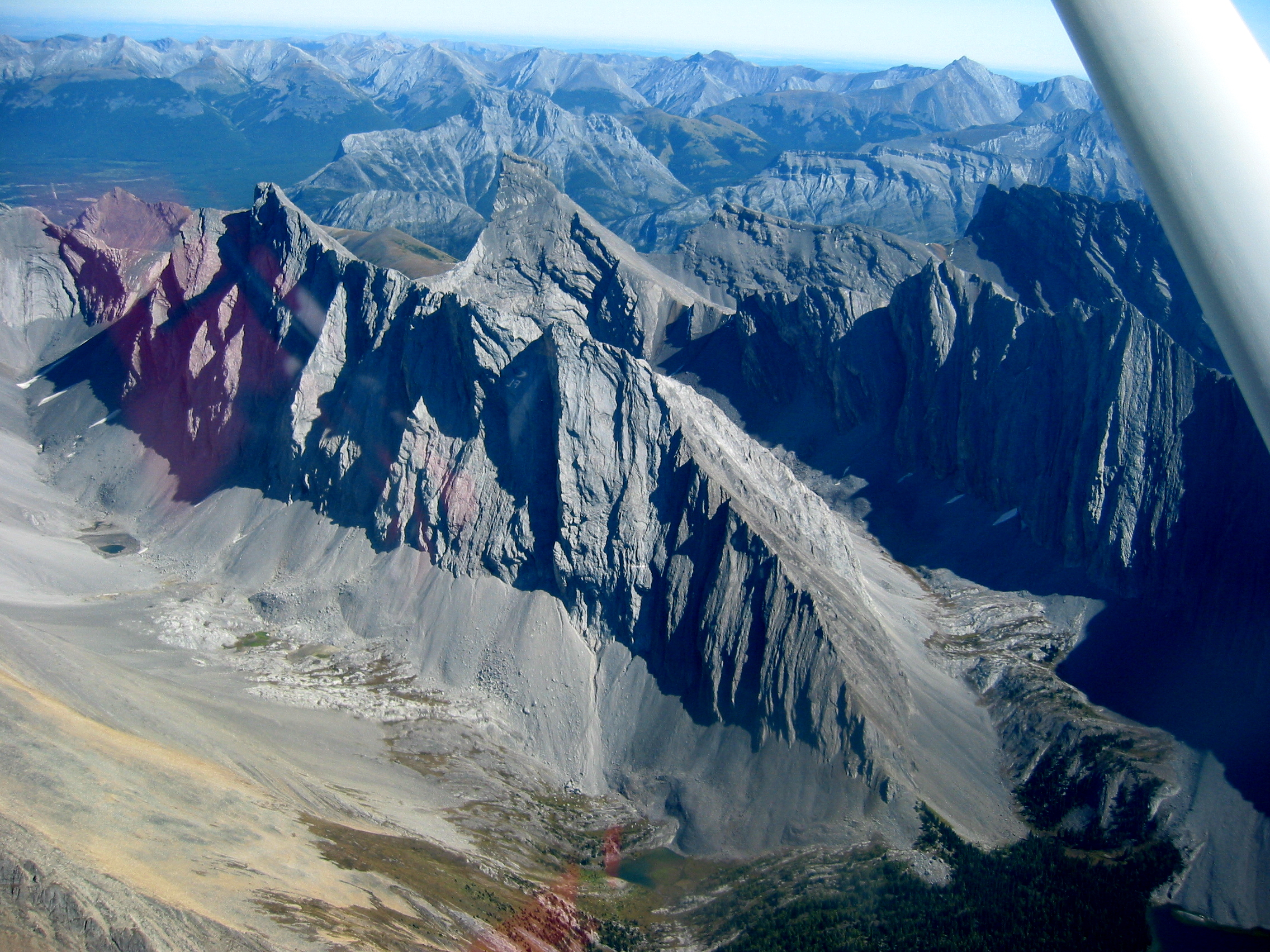
- The Fortress (upper center), Mount Chester (right) and Gusty Peak (left and ridge foreground)

Highest point
- Elevation: 3,000 m (9,800 ft)
- Prominence: 287 m (942 ft)
- Listing: Mountains of Alberta
- Coordinates: 50°49′40″N 115°14′36″W

Geography
- Location within Alberta Location within Canada
- Country: Canada
- Province: Alberta
- Protected area: Kananaskis Country
- Parent range: Kananaskis Range; Canadian Rockies
- Topo map: NTS 82J14 Spray Lakes Reservoir

Climbing
- Easiest route: Scramble on southwest ridge

The Fortress (3,000 m (9,843 ft)) is a mountain located SE of Gusty Peak in the Kananaskis River Valley of Kananaskis Park of the Canadian Rockies. When viewed from Highway 40, the north face presents a fortress like appearance. The Fortress should not be confused with nearby Fortress Mountain.

The mountain was originally named Tower Mountain but was changed in 1957 to its current name so as not to be confused with Tower Mountain.

== Climbing routes ==
The southwestern slopes can be scrambled from either the Chester Lake side or Headwall Lakes side. Both routes join at the Chester-Fortress col. From the col, a steep path ascends the remaining 325 m (1,066 ft) to the summit. Only the final section of the summit block requires any real hands on scrambling. The Headwall Lakes approach takes longer but the scree slopes leading to the col are not as loose as the Chester Lake side, which serves as a better descent route.

== Climate ==
Based on the Köppen climate classification, The Fortress is located in a subarctic climate with cold, snowy winters, and mild summers. Temperatures can drop below −20 C with wind chill factors below −30 C.

== Gallery ==
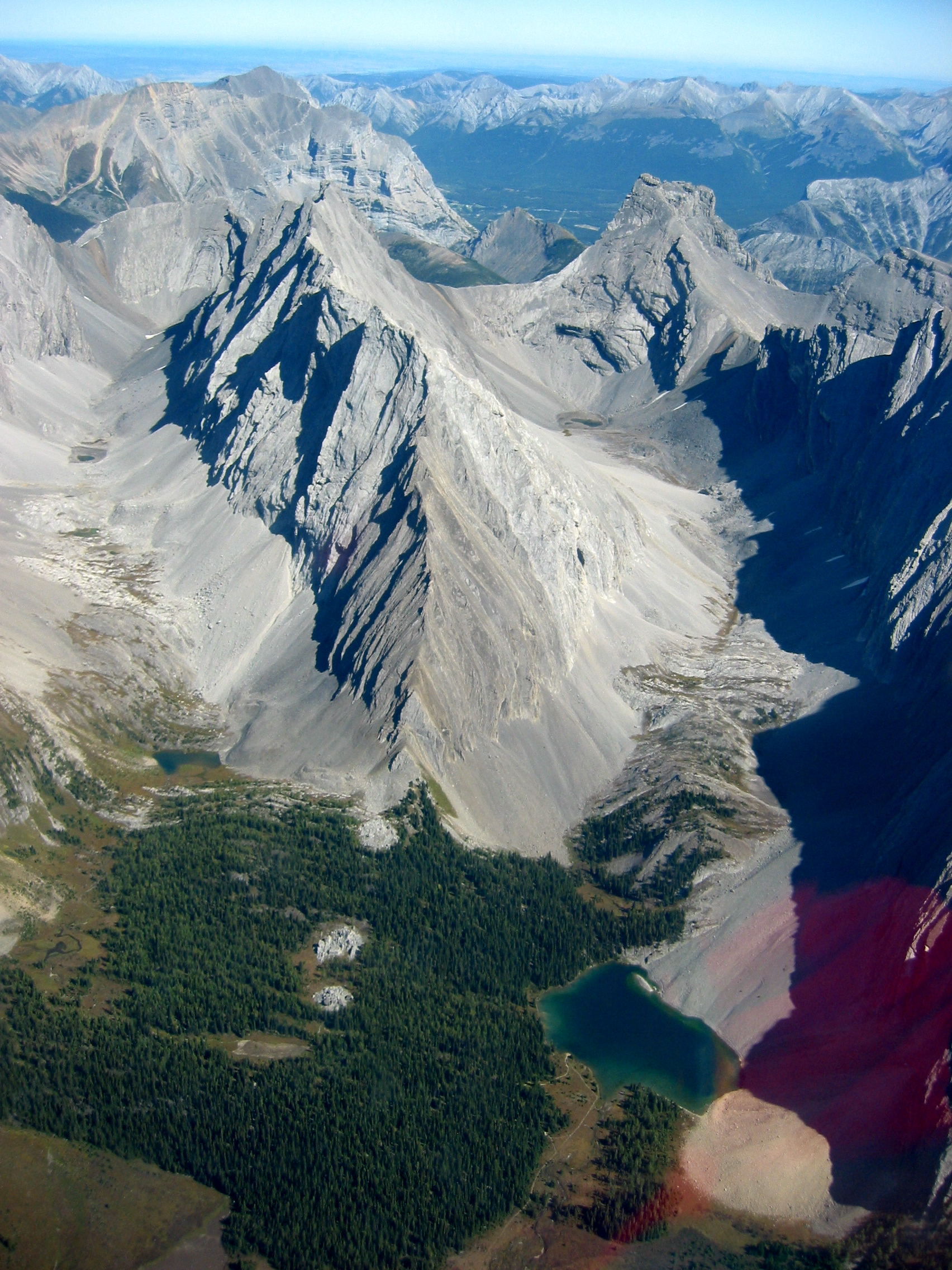
Chester Lake with The Fortress behind

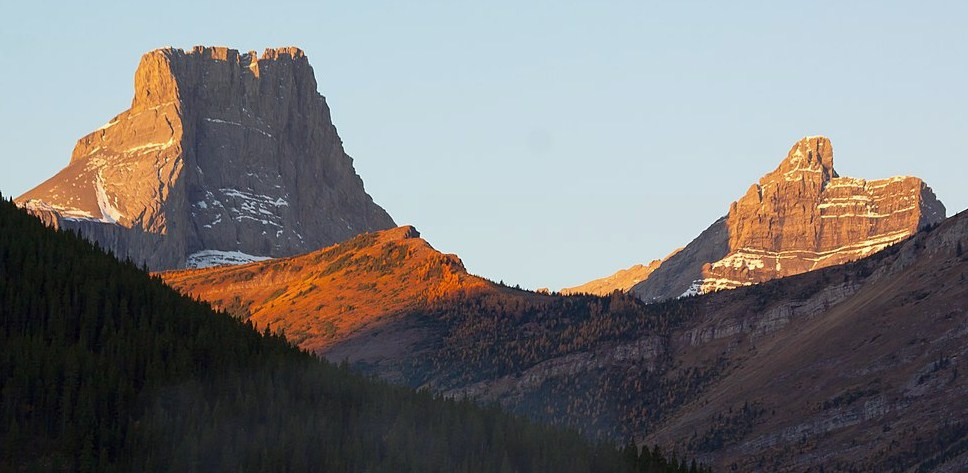
The Fortress and Gusty Peak

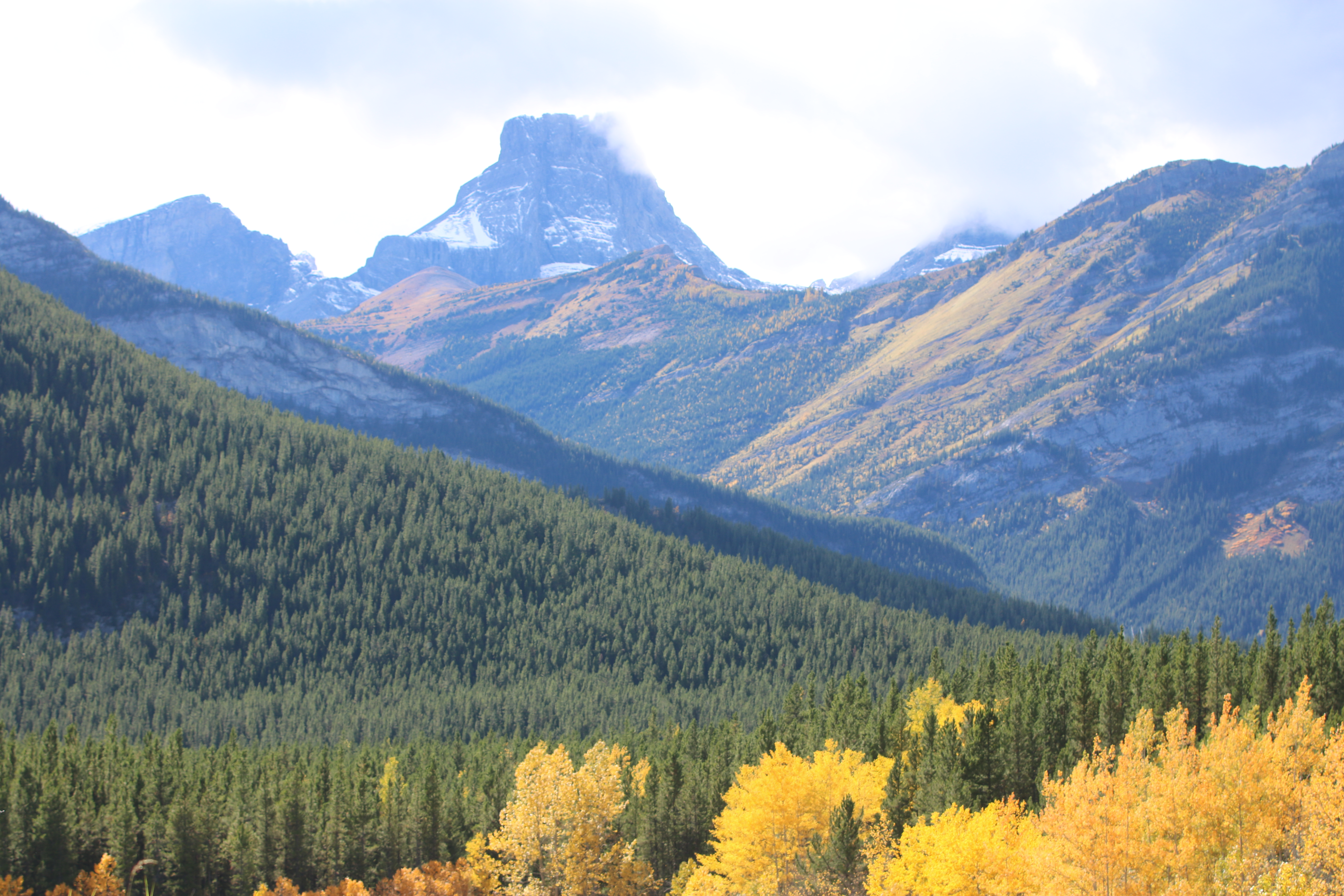
The Fortress

== See also ==
- Fortress Mountain Resort
- List of mountains in the Canadian Rockies
