= Chester Lake =

Chester Lake can refer to:

- Chester Lake (Alberta), a lake in Alberta, Canada
- Chester Morse Lake, a lake in Washington, United States
- Chester Lake (Law & Order), a fictional character on the television series Law & Order: Special Victims Unit
