= Boy seaman =

Naval rating

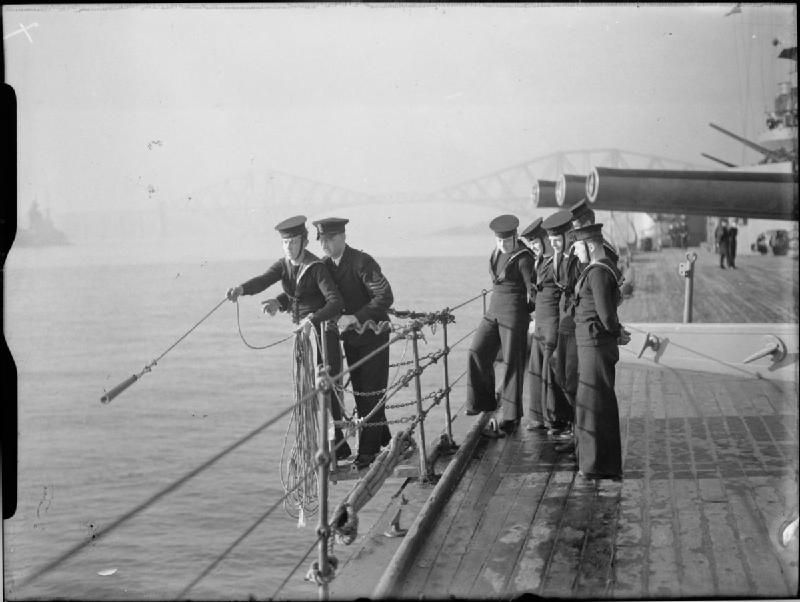
British boy sailors receiving instruction on how to use a sounding line onboard the battleship HMS Rodney during World War II

A boy seaman (plural boy seamen) is a boy who serves as seaman or is trained for such service.

== Royal Navy ==
In the British Royal Navy, and Mercantile Marine, where there was a need to recruit enough hands to man the vast fleets of the British Empire, extensive regulations existed concerning the selection and status of boys enlisted to keep filling the ranks.

Various specific terms were introduced for different age- and exam-related stages in a boy's potential career:

- Apprentice – boy aged 16 to 18 trained in technical skills at the dockyard schools to become an artificer.
- Boy, as rated (after World War II known as a 'junior') – aged between 15½ and 18. On a Boy's 18th birthday he automatically became rated as an ordinary seaman and was subject to the Naval Discipline Act as applicable to adult seamen.
- Boy 1st class – a boy aged 16 to 18 under training, who had previously served for between 9 months and 18 months rated as "Boy 2nd class", shown sufficient proficiency in seamanship, and accumulated at least one good conduct badge (the requirements varied between training ships). His rate of pay was increased on being promoted.
- Boy 2nd class – a boy aged 15 to 17 rated as such on entry to a training ship of the Royal Navy. Such entry was conditional on a boy's adequate physical height, weight, medical fitness, and evidence of being of 'good character'. The boy's parents or guardians would sign a declaration that the boy would serve in the navy for a minimum period (usually 12 years).
- Boy 3rd class – a boy aged 14 to 18 who served either as a domestic (waiter, steward) aboard the port flagships or as a junior clerk or storekeeper in the ports. He would be eligible for entry to a training ship as a Boy 2nd class from age 15 if he met the physical requirements. The majority of such boys were enlisted from homes in the ports and were not wholly resident on ships or in the dockyards.
- Powder-boy was a role for younger boys to service artillery.
- Cadet – boys aged 13 to 15 enlisted to become officers and trained on a training ship reserved for such schooling; the last was HMS Britannia, while moored at Dartmouth from 1869 to 1905.
- Midshipman – a boy aged 16 to 18 serving aboard a seagoing ship, having passed out of the cadet ship and undergoing further training before being promoted to the fully commissioned officer rank of sub-lieutenant.

It is widely believed that the loss of 134 Boy seamen in the 1939 sinking of HMS Royal Oak caused the Royal Navy to reconsider its position on Boy seamen in combat, such was the uproar in Parliament when the sinking was announced.

Neither the Royal Navy nor the British government have ever confirmed this to be true, although shortly afterwards, Boy seamen were withdrawn from front line service and the Royal Navy thereafter only sent Boy seamen into battle in 'drastic circumstances'.

Possibly the most famous Boy seaman is Boy 1st Class Jack Cornwell, who was posthumously awarded the Victoria Cross for gallantry at the Battle of Jutland during World War I.

== United States Navy ==
Prior to the First World War, the United States Navy allowed males under the age of 18 to serve on ships who were officially referred to as "boys".

In 1828, ships were allowed to have boys between 14 and 18 at the ratio of one boy for every two guns the ship carried. (i.e. a 44 gun frigate could have up to 22 boys in its crew.) Article 464 of Naval Regulations published in 1833 stated, "A recruiting officer shall enter no boy under thirteen years of age; nor any person under twenty-one years of age, without the consent of their parent or guardian".

The Circular Relating to the Enlistment of Boys in the United States Navy issued on 8 April 1875 by Secretary of the Navy George M. Robeson, provided for the enlistment, with parental consent, of boys between the ages of 15 and 18 (i.e. not past their 18th birthday) until their 21st birthday. Each boy enlisted has to be "of robust frame, intelligent, of perfectly sound and healthy constitution, free from any physical defects or malformation; and not subject to fits." The boys also had to be at least 5 feet 1 inch high and measure 30 inches around the chest. The boys would be enlisted as second-class boys and be paid $10.50 per month and one ration. Boys were not permitted to make allotments to their parents and were allowed to draw only one dollar per month for "pocket money". This practice was officially called a "minority enlistment" and remained in effect, except that the minimum age of enlistment was increased, until the 1960s.

The training of the boys was to take place on the steam frigate USS Minnesota, then stationed at the New York Navy Yard. Boys who proved their abilities onboard Minnesota could be promoted to First Class Boy. The boys would be transferred to a sea going vessel upon their 18th birthday.

In the 1880s, Captain (later Rear Admiral) Stephen B. Luce established an apprentice training program in the U.S. Navy where males as young as 15 could be enlisted, with their parents' permission, and then serve an apprenticeship on training ships before being assigned to the fleet. The first six months were on a stationary training ship where the apprentices learned fundamental skills which included basic literacy, gunnery, seamanship and shipboard maintenance. The next phase of training was assignment to a cruising training ship where the apprentice was expected to complete both a winter and a summer cruise before being sent to ship in the fleet.

Luce's theory behind the apprentice training program was to provide the Navy with young sailors who were already trained and adapted to shipboard life. This was in contrast to traditional recruiting which would take any able bodied applicant and have them learn on the job. The problem with the traditional method was that many of the new "landsmen" (i.e. inexperienced sailors) were unable to adapt to Navy life or were sometimes criminals. The apprentice program, Luce hoped, would give the Navy the opportunity to make good sailors during their formative years which, in the long run, would provide better trained and more disciplined sailors in the enlisted ranks.

The apprentice program ended with the establishment of the Recruit Training Center at Naval Station Great Lakes in 1911. In the few years prior to World War I, the Navy rapidly expanded and needed new sailors in large numbers as quickly as possible. The result was the abolition of the apprentice program and the establishment of an 8-week "boot camp" which would transform civilians into sailors in a much shorter time frame.

In 1909, Navy regulations were changed so that the minimum age for enlistment was raised to 17 with parental permission and 18 without. Recruits enlisted under age 18 served until they reached age 21 at which point, they could be discharged or, if they chose, re-enlist for four years.

== Sources ==
- CorPun- Glossary
- Origins of the U.S. Navy Apprentice System
