= Jack Cornwell =

Recipient of the Victoria Cross

John Travers Cornwell
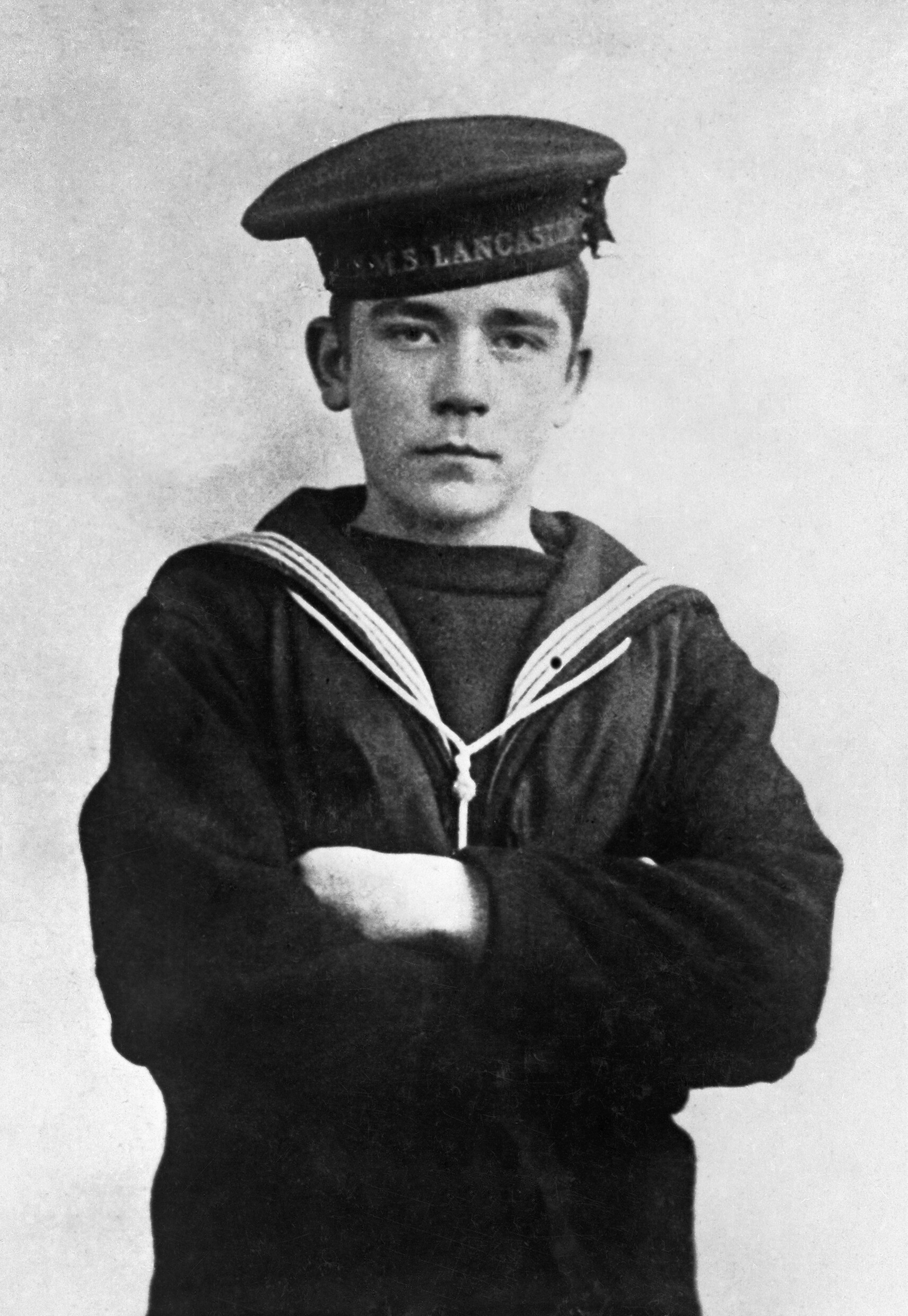
- The iconic image of Jack Cornwell as used by the press at the time of his death. It is nowadays thought to show a younger brother.
- Born: 8 January 1900; Leyton, Essex, England
- Died: 2 June 1916 (aged 16); Grimsby, England
- Burial place: Manor Park Cemetery, London
- Military career
- Branch: Royal Navy
- Service years: 1915–1916
- Rank: Boy 1st Class
- Units: HMS Chester
- Conflicts: Battle of Jutland
- Awards: Victoria Cross

John Travers Cornwell VC (8 January 1900–2 June 1916), commonly known as Jack Cornwell or as Boy Cornwell, is remembered for his gallantry at the Battle of Jutland during World War I. Having died at the age of only 16, he was posthumously awarded the Victoria Cross, the highest award for gallantry in the face of the enemy that can be awarded to British and Commonwealth forces. Cornwell is the third-youngest recipient of the VC after Andrew Fitzgibbon and Thomas Flynn.

== Biography ==
=== Early life ===
John "Jack" Travers Cornwell was born as the third child of a working-class family at Clyde Place, Leyton, Essex (now in Greater London). His parents were Eli and Lily Cornwell; he had a sister and three brothers, as well as two half-siblings from his father's previous marriage. The family later moved to Alverstone Road, East Ham. He left Walton Road School at the standard age of 14. At the outbreak of the First World War, his father, an ex-soldier, volunteered for service and fought in France. His older brother Arthur also served as an infantryman on the Western Front.

In October 1915, Jack Cornwell gave up his job as a delivery boy and enlisted in the Royal Navy without his father's permission. He had references from his headmaster and employer. He carried out his basic training at HMS Vivid Keyham Naval Barracks in Plymouth. He received further training as a Sight Setter or Gun Layer and became a Boy Seaman 1st Class. On Easter Monday 1916, Cornwell left for Rosyth, Scotland, to join HMS Chester.

=== Death during the Battle of Jutland ===
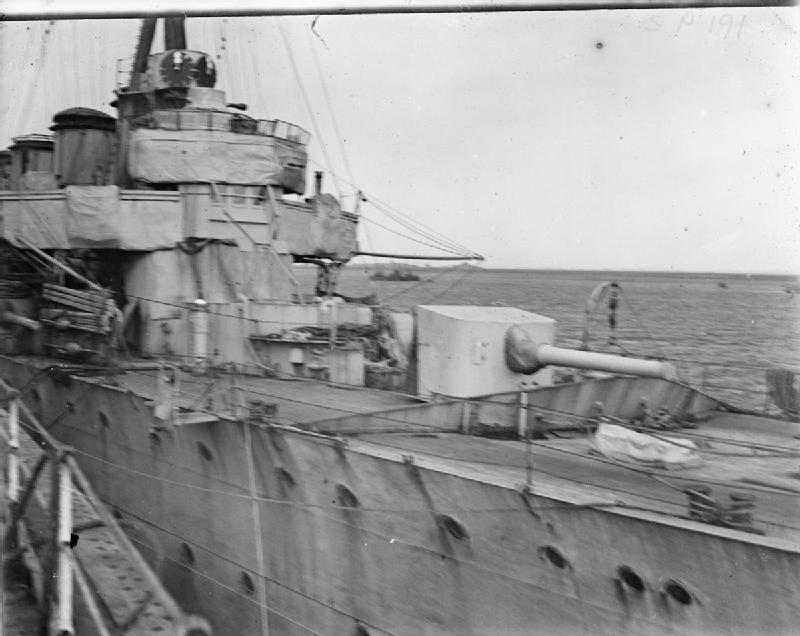
Jack Cornwell's gun, HMS Chester

On 31 May 1916, Chester was scouting ahead of the 3rd Battlecruiser Squadron at the Battle of Jutland when the ship turned to investigate gunfire in the distance. At 17:30 hours, Chester came under intense fire from four Kaiserliche Marine cruisers that were each her own size. They had emerged from the haze and increasing funnel smoke of the battlefield. The shielded 5.5-inch gun mounting where Cornwell was serving as a sight-setter was affected by at least four nearby hits. Chester's gun mountings were open-backed shields and did not reach down to the deck. Splinters were thus able to pass under them or enter the open back when shells exploded nearby or behind. All the gun's crew were killed or mortally injured except Cornwell, who, although severely wounded, managed to stand up again and remain at his post for more than 15 minutes, until Chester retired from the action with only one main battery gun still working. Chester had received 18 hits, but partial hull armour meant that the interior of the ship suffered little serious damage and the ship itself was never in peril of sinking. Nevertheless, the situation on deck was dire. British ships reported passing the Chester to cheers from limbless wounded gun crew laid out on her deck and smoking cigarettes, only to hear that the same crewmen had died a few hours later from blood loss and shock.

After the action, medics arrived on deck to find Cornwell the sole survivor standing at his gun, shards of steel penetrating his chest, looking at the gun sights and still waiting for orders. Being incapable of further action, Chester was ordered to the port of Immingham. There Cornwell was transferred to Grimsby General Hospital. He died shortly before 8:00am on the morning of 2 June 1916, before his mother could arrive at the hospital.

=== Burial ===
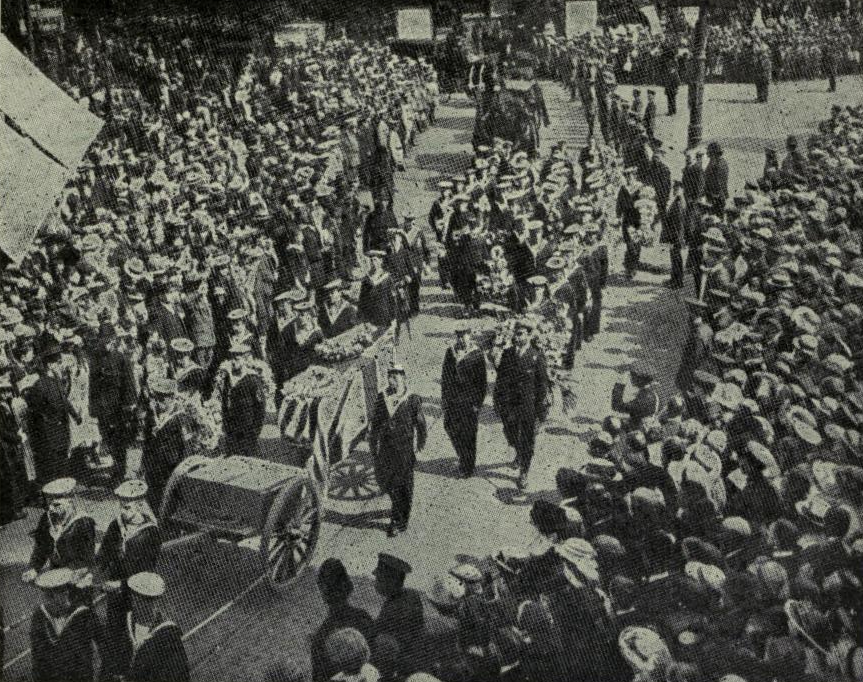
The funeral procession at Manor Park on 29 July 1916

Jack Cornwell was initially buried in a common grave (Square 126 Grave 323) in Manor Park Cemetery, London. His body was exhumed on 29 July 1916 and he was reburied with full military honours in the same cemetery (square 55 grave 13). Cornwell's father Eli, who died aged 64 in October 1916 during home service with the Royal Defence Corps, was buried in the same cemetery. The epitaph to Jack Cornwell on his grave monument reads "It is not wealth or ancestry but honourable conduct and a noble disposition that maketh men great."

In May 2016, the family grave and war memorial, erected in 1920, was given Grade II listed status, legally protecting it from unauthorised modification or removal.

== Victoria Cross ==
Though at first reluctant, the British Admiralty decided to recommend Cornwell for a posthumous Victoria Cross and King George V endorsed it. The recommendation for citation, from Admiral David Beatty, reads:

The instance of devotion to duty by Boy (1st Class) John Travers Cornwell who was mortally wounded early in the action, but nevertheless remained standing alone at a most exposed post, quietly awaiting orders till the end of the action, with the gun's crew dead and wounded around him. He was under 16½ years old. I regret that he has since died, but I recommend his case for special recognition in justice to his memory and as an acknowledgement of the high example set by him.

The award of the Victoria Cross appeared in The London Gazette on Friday 15 September 1916, the day before Cornwell's mother Alice received the Victoria Cross from King George V at Buckingham Palace. The citation read:

The KING has been graciously pleased to approve the grant of the Victoria Cross to Boy, First Class, John Travers Cornwell, O.N.J.42563 (died 2 June 1916), for the conspicuous act of bravery specified below. Mortally wounded early in the action, Boy, First Class, Jack Travers Cornwell remained standing alone at a most exposed post, quietly awaiting orders, until the end of the action, with the gun's crew dead and wounded all round him. His age was under sixteen and a half years.

== Commemoration ==
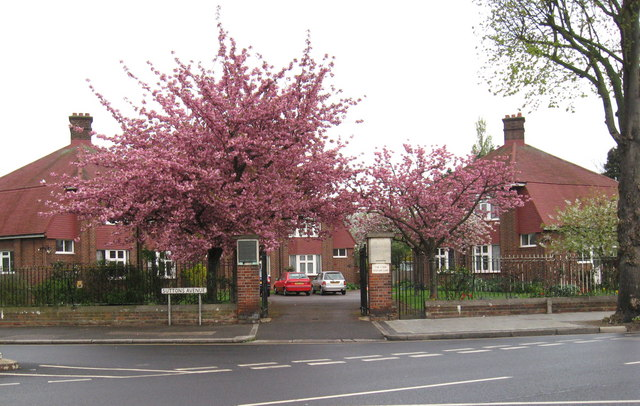
The John Cornwell Victoria Cross National Memorial cottages in Hornchurch

A portrait of Cornwell was painted by the court painter Frank O. Salisbury, who used Cornwell's brother Ernest as a model, depicting him standing in his post. A Boy Cornwell Memorial Fund was established. After Eli Cornwell's death on 25 October 1916, his half-brother Arthur Frederick Cornwell was killed in action in France on 29 August 1918. Alice Cornwell died at the age of 48 on 31 October 1919, at 745 Commercial Road in Stepney, in rooms she was forced to take when her son's memorial fund refused financial aid. The two of her children remaining at home were granted £60 a year in a pension from the fund after her death, but this proved insufficient .They emigrated to Canada in the early 1920s. Cornwell's elder half-sister Alice lent the Victoria Cross to the Imperial War Museum in 1968. Salisbury's portrait of Cornwell hangs in the Anglican church within the Royal Navy's Initial Training Establishment HMS Raleigh.

The original furore caused by the boy's very public re-burial led to over seven million children of the British Empire donating to his fund. £18,000 was raised in his memory for the Jack Cornwell ward of the Royal Star and Garter Home, Richmond. The John Cornwell Victoria Cross National Memorial was established in 1928, when a plot of land was purchased at Hornchurch with money raised by the Mayor of East Ham, and a community of cottage homes was built for needy, disabled or infirm former sailors and Royal Marines, up to and including the rank of Warrant Officer and their families. The six semi-detached houses and pathways are laid out in the form of a Victoria Cross. Since 2008, the community has been under the trusteeship of The Royal Naval Benevolent Trust.

=== Commemoration by the Scouts ===
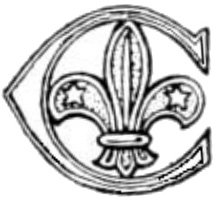
The Cornwell Scout Badge

The Boy Scouts Association created an award in Cornwell's honour, the Cornwell Scout Badge. Used by Commonwealth Scout associations, the badge is awarded to youth participants in respect of pre-eminently high character and devotion to duty, together with great courage and endurance. Camp Cornwell, established in 1925 as the headquarters for Western Australian Sea Scouts is situated at Pelican Point on the Swan River near Perth.

=== Cadets ===
Cornwell is remembered by the Sea Cadet Corps, Army Cadet Force and the Air Training Corps, who each have a unit based in the Cornwell VC Cadet Centre in East Ham. Newham (Cornwell VC) Sea Cadets have been honoured with 'J T Cornwell VC' on their cap ribbon (Cap Tally) instead of the customary TS (training ship). They are the only Sea Cadet Unit in the UK to have this honour. In 2003, the Cadets suggested commemorating Cornwell by renaming his former school in Leyton after him. Cornwell is remembered by Royal Navy Combined Cadet Force (RN CCF) divisions such as the RN CCF section at Whitgift School, Croydon, which is named the "Cornwell" division in his honour.

The Royal Canadian Sea Cadet Corps John Travers Cornwell, VC, based at HMCS Chippawa in Winnipeg, is named after Cornwell.

=== Other memorials ===
In Little Ilford, Jack Cornwell Street and a nearby block of council flats called John Cornwell VC House are named in his memory. A blue plaque has been erected by the London Borough of Waltham Forest on the flats that now occupy the site of his birthplace in Clyde Place, Leyton. The 5.5-inch gun on which he served is displayed in the Imperial War Museum, London. In September 2006, Cornwell featured on one of a series of Royal Mail postage stamps marking the 150th anniversary of the Victoria Cross. In 2016, he was featured on a £5 coin in a six-coin set commemorating the centenary of the First World War produced by the Royal Mint.

Mount Cornwell (2,972 metres (9,751 ft)) is a peak in the High Rock Range in British Columbia was named in Cornwell's honour in 1918.

== Sources ==
- Birrell, Dave (2000). 50 Roadside Panoramas in the Canadian Rockies'. Rocky Mountain Books. ISBN 978-0-921102-65-6.
