= Gusty Peak =

Mountain in Alberta, Canada

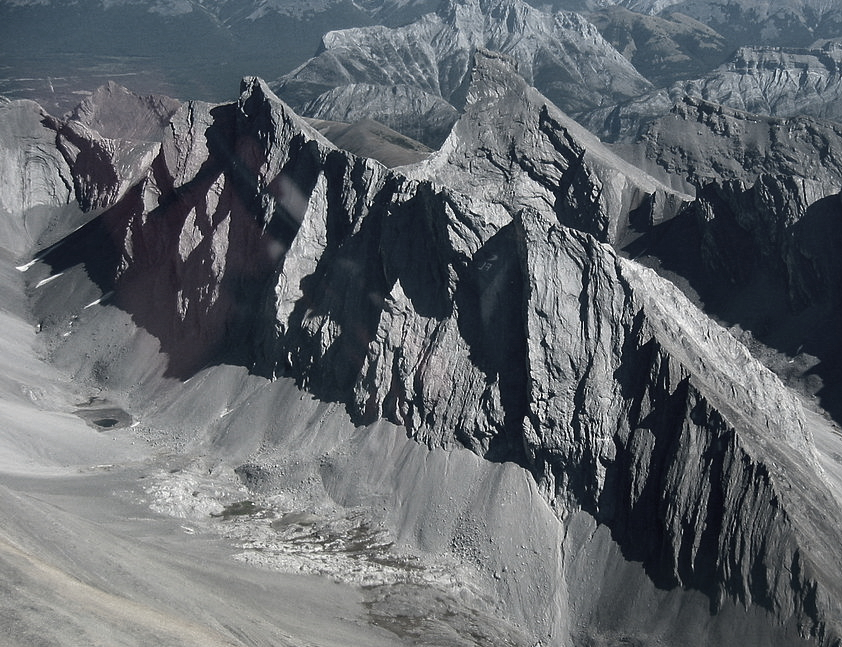

Highest point
- Elevation: 3,000 m (9,800 ft)
- Prominence: 226 m (741 ft)
- Listing: Mountains of Alberta
- Coordinates: 50°49′48″N 115°15′47″W

Geography
- Location within Alberta Location within Canada
- Location: Alberta, Canada
- Parent range: Kananaskis Range; Canadian Rockies
- Topo map: NTS 82J14 Spray Lakes Reservoir

Geology
- Rock type: sedimentary rock

Climbing
- First ascent: 1972 Glen Boles
- Easiest route: Easy ascent via south scree slopes.

Gusty Peak was named by Glen Boles in 1972 after making the first ascent, having completed it during extremely windy weather. It is located in the Kananaskis Range in Alberta.

== Climate ==
Based on the Köppen climate classification, Gusty Peak is located in a subarctic climate with cold, snowy winters, and mild summers. Temperatures can drop below −20 C with wind chill factors below −30 C.

== Gallery ==
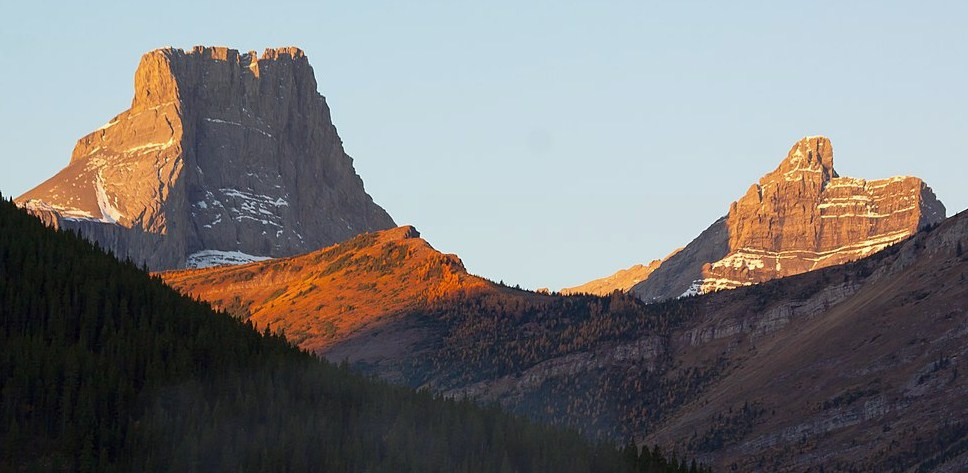
Summits of The Fortress (left) and Gusty Peak (right)
