= Fortress Lake (Alberta) =

- Location within Alberta
- Location: Kananaskis Country, Alberta
- Coordinates: 50°50′4″N 115°14′9″W
- Type: Lake
- Basin countries: Canada
- References: "Place names - Fortress Lake".

Fortress Lake is a lake in Alberta, officially named in 1987 for its proximity to The Fortress.

== See also ==
- List of lakes of Alberta
