= Manor Park Cemetery and Crematorium =

Place of burial in East London, England

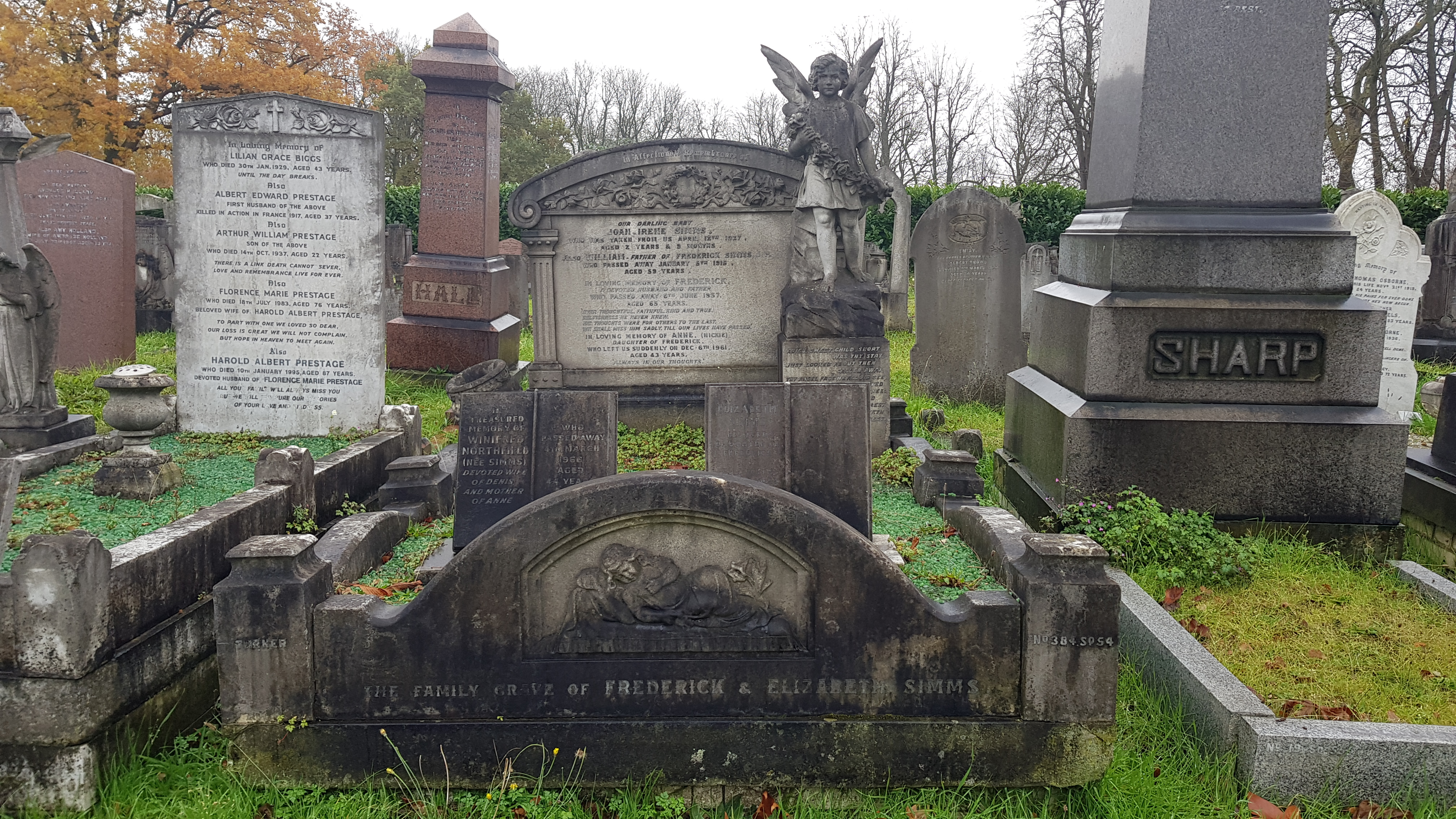
- Manor Park Cemetery, Newham, London

Details
- Established: 1874; 151 years ago
- Location: London
- Country: England
- Coordinates: 51°33′10″N 0°02′18″E
- Owned by: Manor Park Cemetery Company Limited
- Size: 17.4 hectares (43 acres)
- Website: www.mpark.co.uk
- Find a Grave: Manor Park Cemetery and Crematorium

Manor Park Cemetery and Crematorium is a private cemetery in London, England.

== History ==
Manor Park Cemetery was opened in 1874.

== Graves ==
- Annie Chapman, murder victim of Jack the Ripper
- Jack Cornwell, posthumous Victoria Cross recipient
- John Clinton, memorialised at the Memorial to Heroic Self-Sacrifice
- Sarah Chapman, trade unionist and leader of the 1888 Bryant & May matchgirls' strike
- Some of the victims of the 1943 Bethnal Green air-raid shelter disaster
- Paul Di'Anno, English heavy metal singer who was the lead vocalist for Iron Maiden from 1978 to 1981.
