= HMS Chester (1915) =

Light cruiser

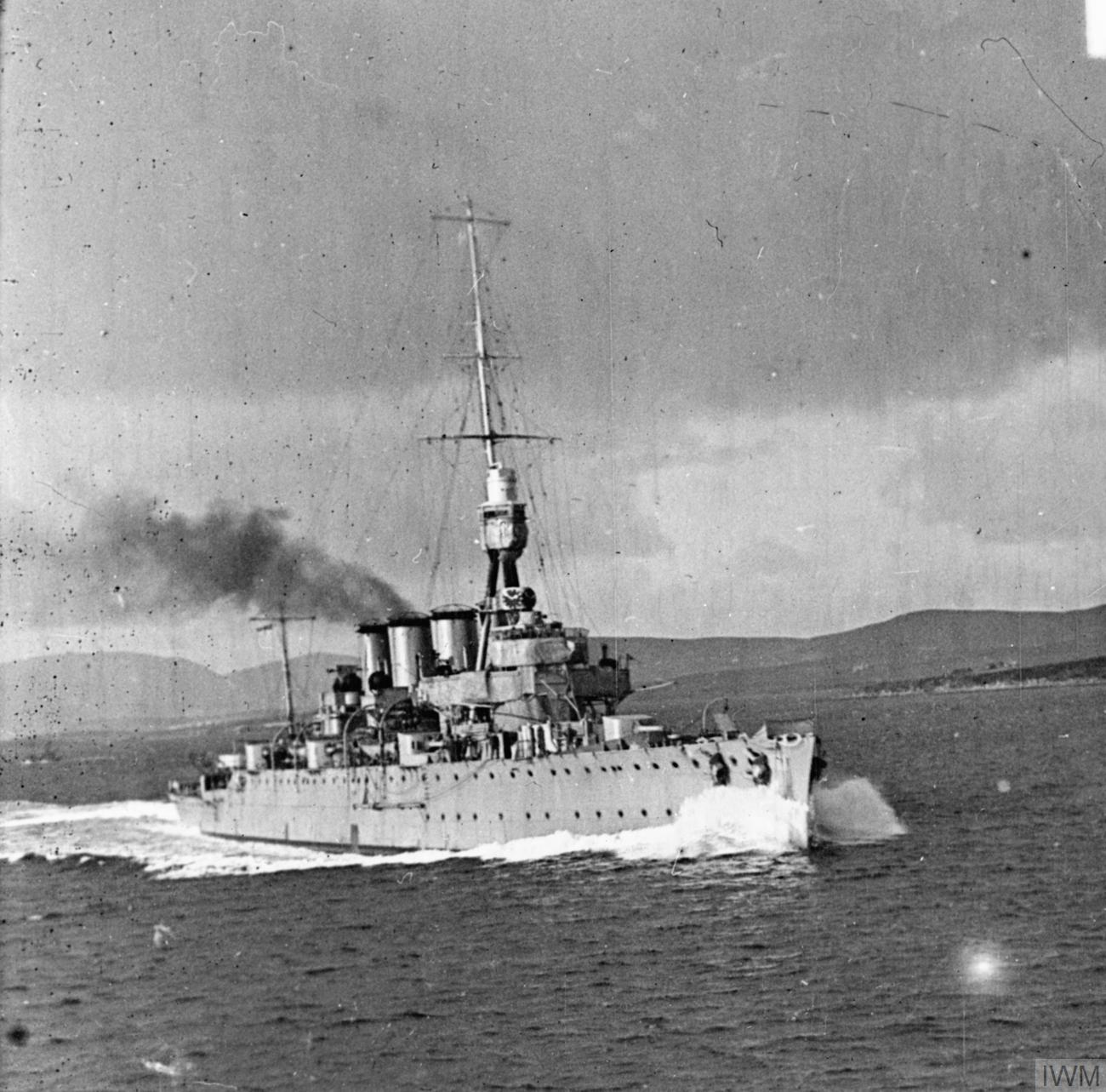

History

Greece
- Name: Lambros Katsonis
- Namesake: Lambros Katsonis
- Builder: Cammell Laird, Birkenhead, England
- Laid down: 7 October 1914
- Launched: 8 December 1915
- Fate: Sold to United Kingdom, 1915

United Kingdom
- Namesake: Chester
- Launched: 8 December 1915
- Acquired: 1915
- Commissioned: May 1916
- Renamed: Chester
- Fate: Sold for scrap, 9 November 1921

General characteristics (as built)
- Class & type: Town-class light cruiser
- Displacement: 5,185 long tons (5,268 t)
- Length: 430 ft (131.1 m) p/p; 456 ft 6 in (139.1 m) o/a
- Beam: 49 ft 10 in (15.2 m)
- Draught: 15 ft 3 in (4.65 m) (mean)
- Installed power: 31,000 shp (23,000 kW); 12 × Yarrow boilers
- Propulsion: 4 × shafts; 3 × steam turbines
- Speed: 26.5 kn (49.1 km/h; 30.5 mph)
- Complement: about 500
- Armament: 10 × single 5.5 in (140 mm) guns; 2 × single 3 pdr (47 mm (1.9 in)) AA guns; 2 × 21 in (533 mm) torpedo tubes
- Armour: Waterline belt: 2 in (51 mm) on 1 in (25 mm) plate; Deck: 0.4–1.5 in (10–38 mm); Conning Tower: 4 in (102 mm)

HMS Chester was a Town-class light cruiser of the Royal Navy, one of two ships forming the Birkenhead subtype. Along with sister ship, Birkenhead, she was originally ordered for the Greek Navy in 1914 and was to be named Lambros Katsonis. The order was placed with Cammell Laird and production continued for the Greek account after the outbreak of the First World War in August 1914. In 1915 the two cruisers were purchased by the British government. She fought at the Battle of Jutland where casualties included John 'Jack' Cornwell who was awarded the highest honour, aged 16.

== Design and description ==
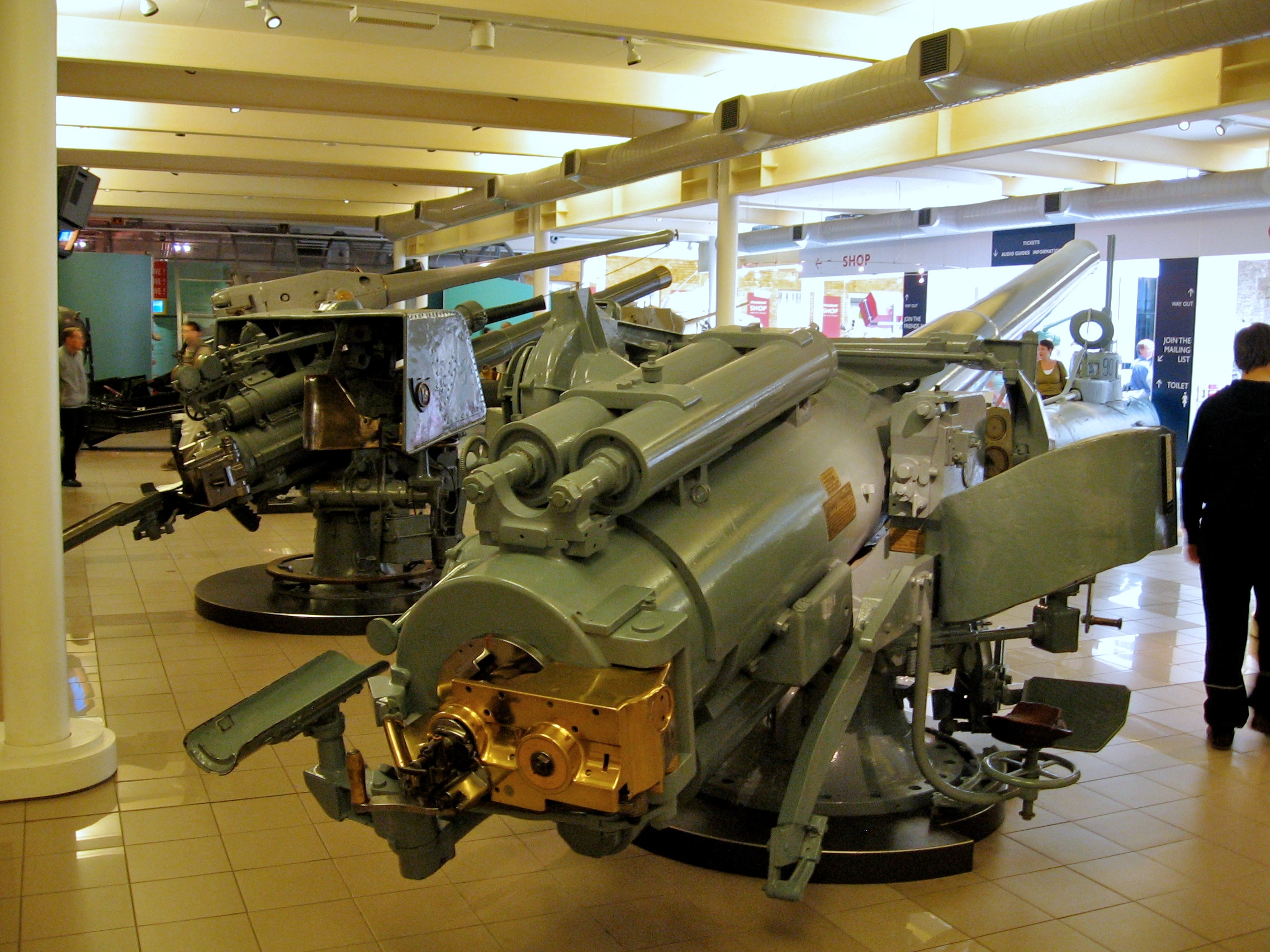
One of Chester's 5.5 inch guns at the Imperial War Museum, London, that was operated by John Cornwell ^{VC} during the Battle of Jutland.

Based on the Birmingham sub-class of the Towns, the two Greek ships primarily differed from their British half-sisters in their armament. The Greeks specified that they would use the new BL 5.5-inch (140 mm) Mk I gun built by the Coventry Ordnance Works. This weapon was significantly lighter than the standard 6-inch (152 mm) gun, which allowed the ships to mount ten guns, rather than the nine of the Birminghams, and fired an 85-pound (39 kg) shell rather than the 100-pound (45 kg) shell of the 6-inch weapon. It therefore had a higher rate of fire with little loss in hitting power. The Greeks also specified a secondary armament of two 12-pounder anti-aircraft guns, but these were still under development in 1915 and a pair of 3-pounder guns on high-angle mounts were substituted instead. In addition, Chester had a requirement for 26.5 knots (49.1 km/h; 30.5 mph) and only used oil-fired boilers to save weight and increase her power to meet the specification.

The ship was 456 feet 6 inches (139.1 m) long overall, with a beam of 49 feet 10 inches (15.2 m) and a draught of 15 feet 3 inches (4.6 m). Displacement was 5,185 long tons (5,268 t) normal and 5,795 long tons (5,888 t) at full load. Twelve Yarrow boilers fed Chester's Parsons steam turbines, driving four propeller shafts, that were rated at 31,000 shaft horsepower (23,000 kW) for her intended speed of 26.5 knots. She carried 1,161 long tons (1,180 t) tons of fuel oil.

== Greek order ==
Along with her sister ship, Birkenhead, she was originally ordered for the Greek Navy in 1914 and was to be named in honour of Lambros Katsonis. The order was placed with Cammell Laird and production continued for the Greek account after the outbreak of the First World War in August 1914. In 1915 the two cruisers were purchased by the British government.

== Service ==
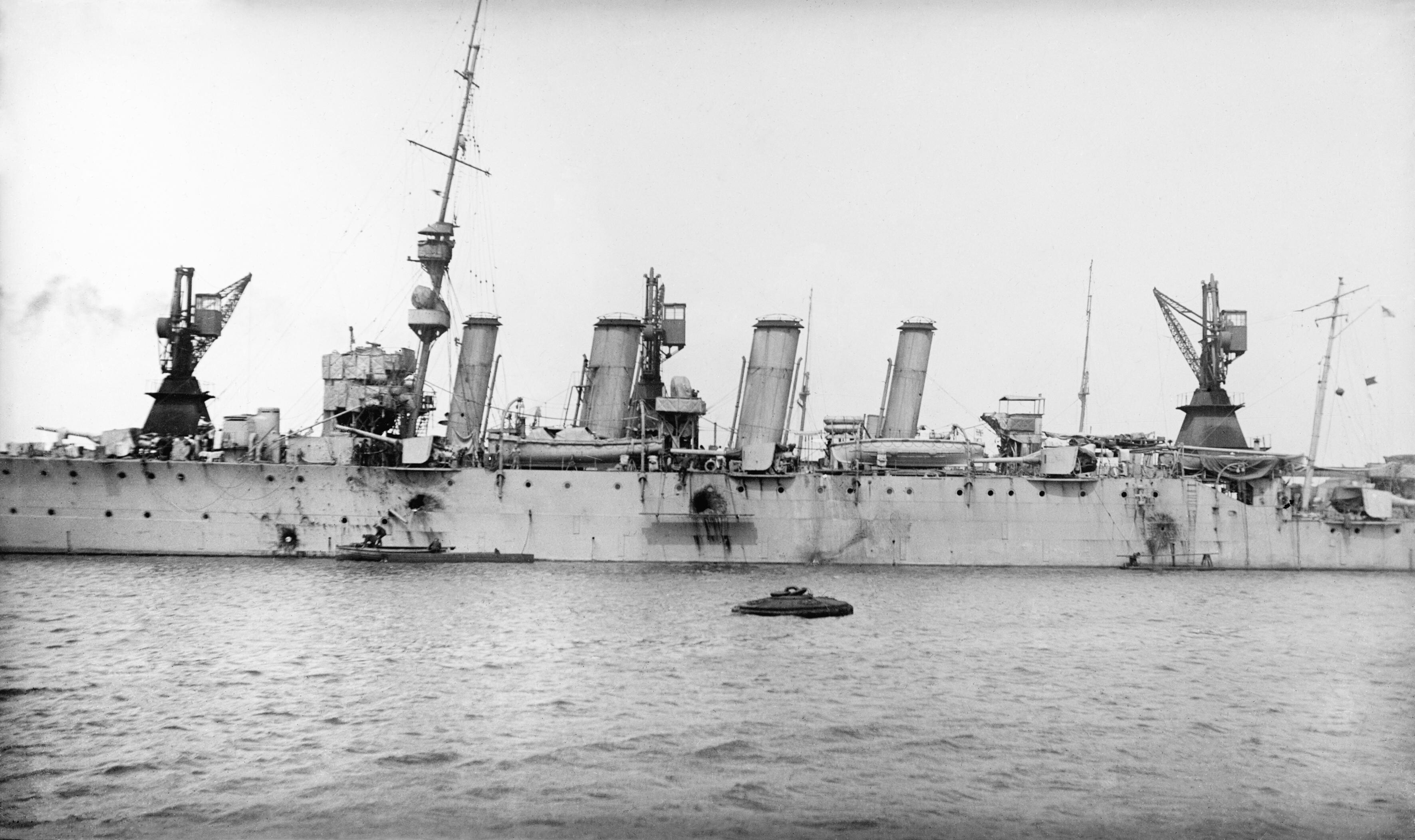
Chester, showing damage sustained at the Battle of Jutland, 31 May 1916

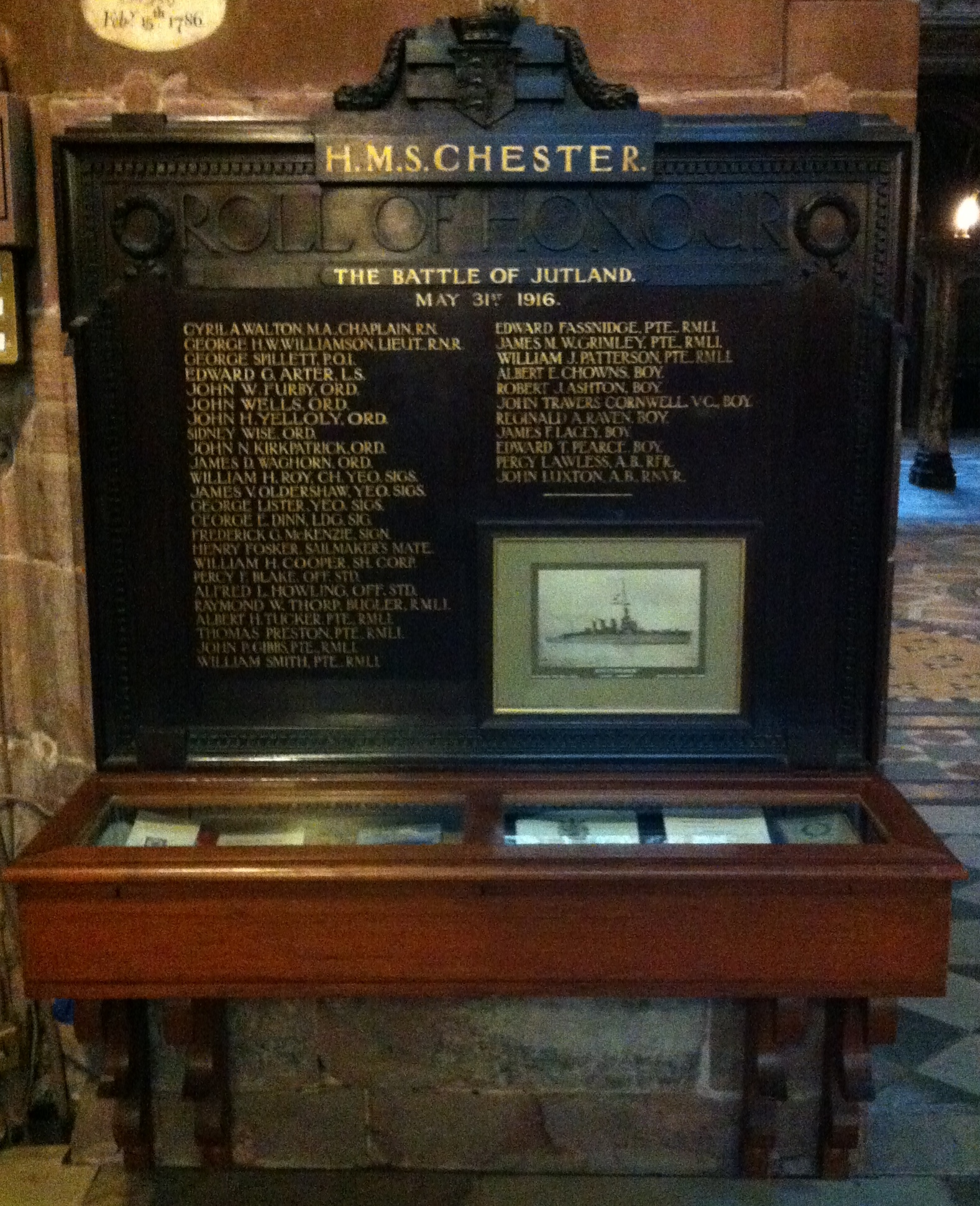
Memorial in Chester Cathedral to 29 men killed and 49 wounded on HMS Chester on 31 May 1916 in the Battle of Jutland.

The ship was laid down on 7 October 1914, launched on 8 December 1915 and entered service in May 1916, three weeks before the Battle of Jutland. At Jutland she fought as part of the 3rd Battle Cruiser Squadron and came under withering fire from German forces. She was hit by 17 150mm shells and suffered 29 men killed and 49 wounded; many of the wounded lost legs because the open backed gun-shields did not reach the deck and give adequate protection. Amongst the gun crew fatalities was 16-year-old John 'Jack' Cornwell who received the Victoria Cross for his dedication to duty though mortally injured. Chester served with the 3rd Light Cruiser Squadron until the Armistice and was subsequently placed in reserve. She was offered for re-sale to Greece but the offer was declined and the ship was sold for scrapping on 9 November 1921 to Rees, of Llanelly. The gun served by Cornwell is preserved in the Imperial War Museum in London.

Mount Chester in the Canadian Rockies was named after this ship and nearby Mount Cornwell after John Cornwell.

== Bibliography ==
- Colledge, J. J.; Warlow, Ben & Bush, Steve (2020). Ships of the Royal Navy: The Complete Record of all Fighting Ships of the Royal Navy from the 15th Century to the Present (5th revised and updated ed.). Seaforth Publishing. ISBN 978-1-5267-9327-0.
- Corbett, Julian. Naval Operations to the Battle of the Falklands. History of the Great War: Based on Official Documents. Vol. I (2nd ed.). Imperial War Museum and Battery Press. ISBN 0-89839-256-X.
- Corbett, Julian (1997) [1929]. Naval Operations. History of the Great War: Based on Official Documents. Vol. II (Second ed.). Imperial War Museum in association with the Battery Press. ISBN 1-870423-74-7.
- Friedman, Norman (2010). British Cruisers: Two World Wars and After. Naval Institute Press. ISBN 978-1-59114-078-8.
- Lyon, David (1977). "The First Town Class 1908–31: Part 1". Warship. 1 (1). Conway Maritime Press: 48–58. ISBN 0-85177-132-7.
- Lyon, David (1977). "The First Town Class 1908–31: Part 2". Warship. 1 (2). Conway Maritime Press: 54–61. ISBN 0-85177-132-7.
- Lyon, David (1977). "The First Town Class 1908–31: Part 3". Warship. 1 (3). Conway Maritime Press: 46–51. ISBN 0-85177-132-7.
- Newbolt, Henry (1996) [1931]. Naval Operations. History of the Great War Based on Official Documents. Vol. V. Battery Press. ISBN 0-89839-255-1.
