= Andrew Fitzgibbon =

Recipient of the Victoria Cross (1845–1883)

- Victoria Cross Medal
- Born: 13 May 1845; Pithoragarh, Uttarakhand, India
- Died: 7 March 1883 (aged 37); Delhi, India
- Burial place: Old Military Cemetery, Delhi, India
- Military career
- Allegiance: British India
- Branch: British Indian Army
- Rank: Apothecary
- Units: Indian Medical Establishment
- Conflicts: Second Opium War: Battle of Taku Forts
- Awards: Victoria Cross

Andrew Fitzgibbon VC (13 May 1845 – 7 March 1883) was a British soldier, and possibly the youngest recipient of the Victoria Cross.

== Details ==
Fitzgibbon was born in Pithoragarh, Uttarakhand, India. He was fifteen years old, and a Hospital Apprentice in the Indian Medical Establishment, Indian Army, attached to the 67th Regiment (later The Royal Hampshire Regiment) during the Third China War when the deed for which he was awarded the VC took place.

On 21 August 1860 at the capture of the Northern of the Taku Forts, China, Fitzgibbon accompanied a wing of the 67th Regiment when it took up a position within 500 yards of the fort. He proceeded, under heavy fire, to attend a dhoolie-bearer whose wound he had been directed to bind up. Then, while the regiment was advancing under the enemy's fire, he ran across the open ground to attend to another wounded man. In doing so he was himself severely wounded.

== Further information ==
Acknowledged to be youngest recipient of the VC (aged 15 years, 3 months), with Thomas Flynn (VC). Jack Cornwell was 16 years old when he was awarded a posthumous Victoria Cross after the Battle of Jutland.

Fitzgibbon later achieved the rank of Apothecary. He died in Delhi, India on 7 March 1883. He is believed to have been buried with his Victoria Cross.
