= Mount Chester =

Mountain in Kananaskis, Alberta, Canada

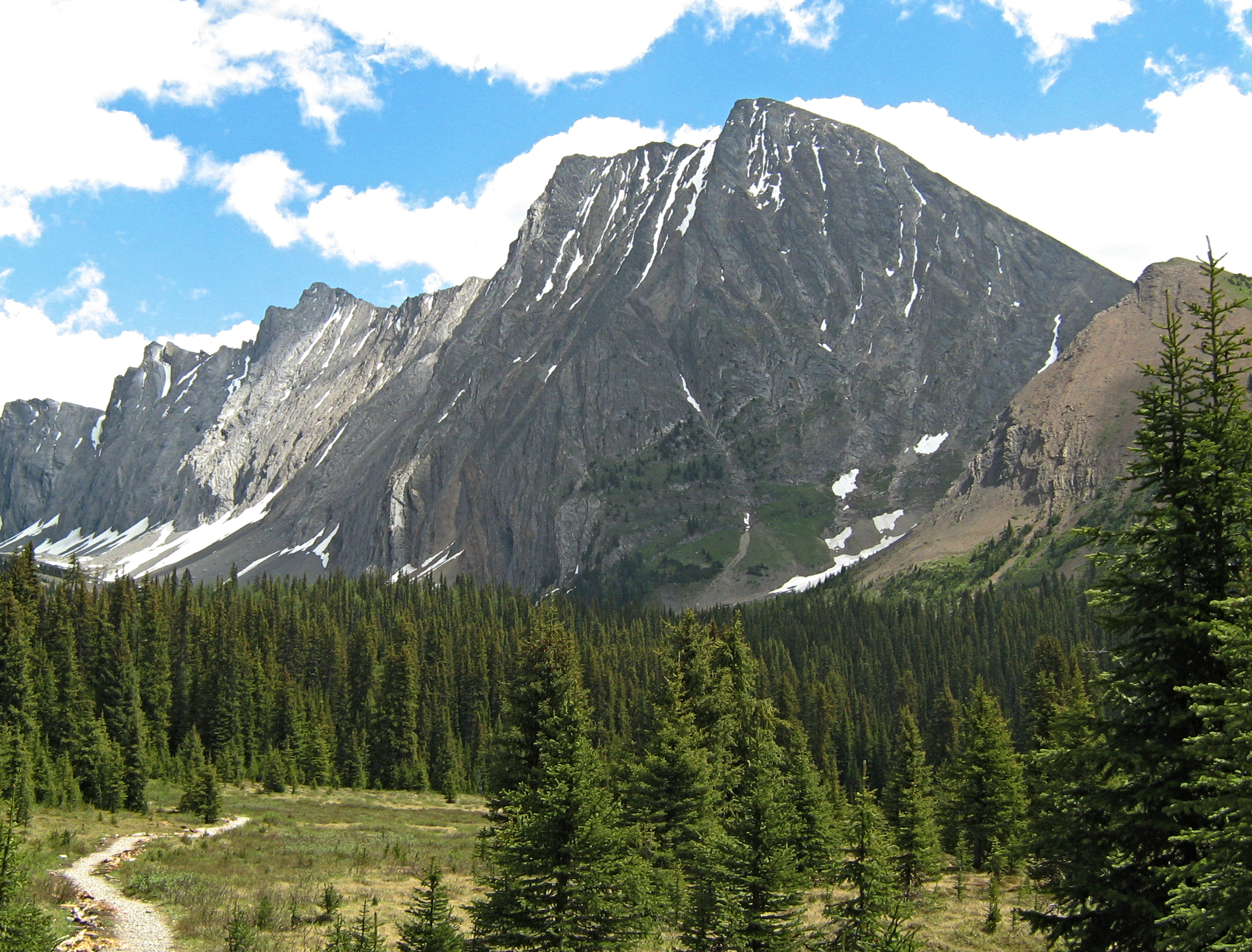

Highest point
- Elevation: 3,054 m (10,020 ft)
- Prominence: 341 m (1,119 ft)
- Coordinates: 50°48′26″N 115°15′48″W

Geography
- Location within Alberta
- Location: Alberta, Canada
- Parent range: Kananaskis Range
- Topo map: NTS 82J14 Spray Lakes Reservoir

Climbing
- Easiest route: Scramble on southwest face

Mount Chester is a mountain located in the Smith-Dorrien Creek Valley of Kananaskis in the Canadian Rockies. The mountain was named in 1917 after HMS Chester, which was severely damaged in the Battle of Jutland.

Chester Lake is located in a small valley just northwest of the base of the mountain.

== Geology ==
Mount Chester is composed of sedimentary rock laid down during the Precambrian to Jurassic periods. Formed in shallow seas, this sedimentary rock was pushed east and over the top of younger rock during the Laramide orogeny.

== Climate ==
Based on the Köppen climate classification, Mount Chester is located in a subarctic climate with cold, snowy winters, and mild summers. Temperatures can drop below −20 °C with wind chill factors below −30 °C. In terms of favorable weather, July through September are the best months to climb.
