= Chester Lake (Alberta) =

Lake in Kananaskis Improvement District, Alberta, Canada

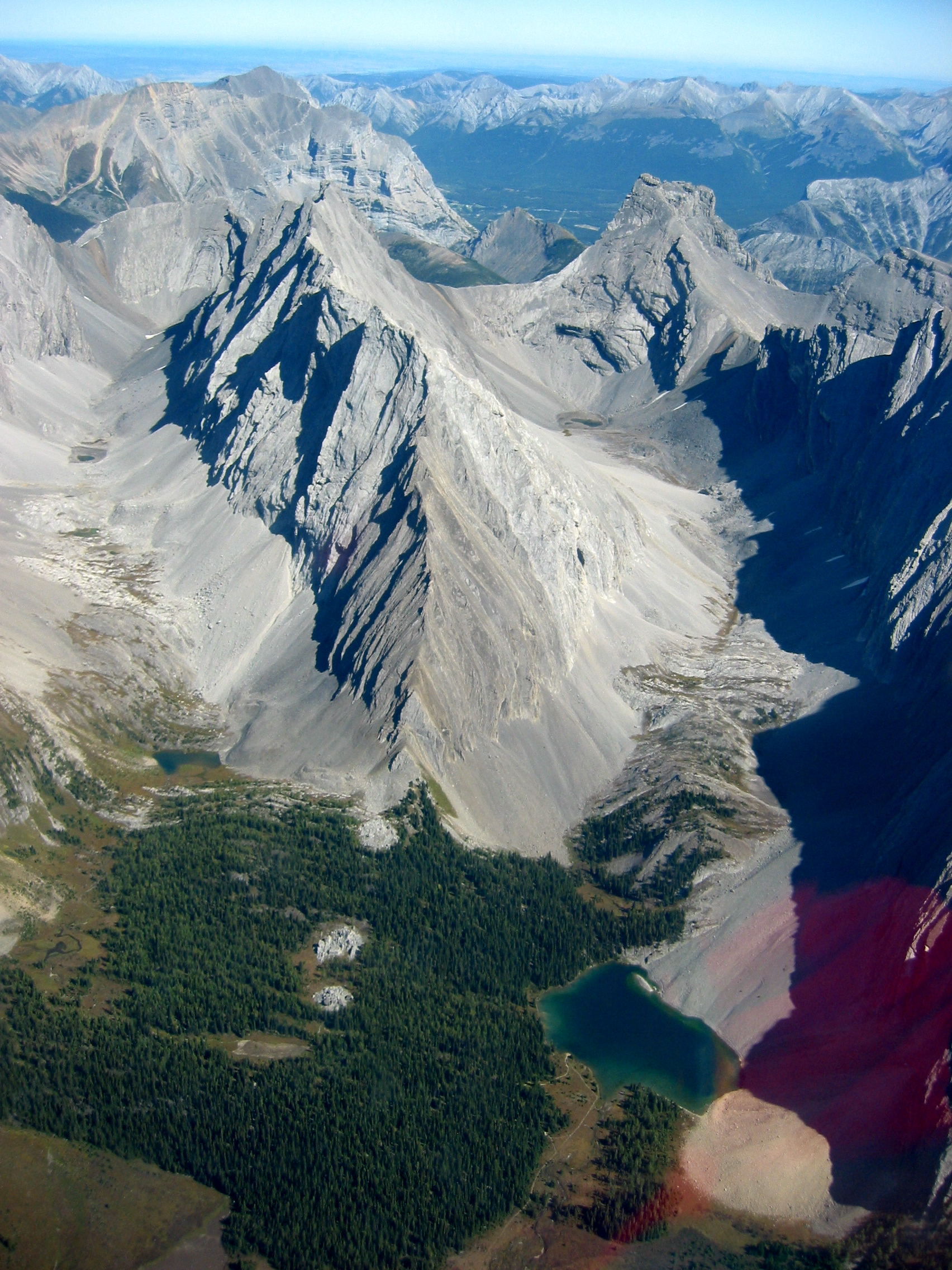
- ChesterLake (lower right), Gusty Peak (left and ridge center), and The Fortress (upper right)

- Location within Alberta
- Location: Kananaskis, Alberta
- Coordinates: 50°48′42″N 115°16′29″W
- Basin countries: Canada

Chester Lake is a small lake in the Alberta side of the Canadian Rockies.

It is located in the valley north west of Mount Chester in Spray Valley Provincial Park, Kananaskis Country in Alberta, Canada.

It can be accessed from the Smith-Dorrien / Spray Trail road from the Chester day use area. In winter, the trail leading to the lake is very popular for snowshoeing.
