= Thomas Flynn (VC) =

Recipient of the Victoria Cross (1842–1892)

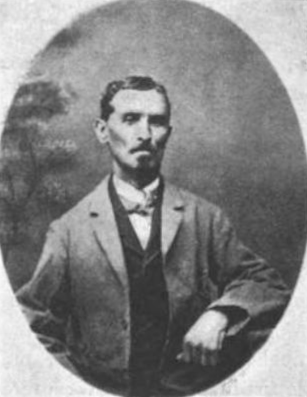
- Born: August 1842; Athlone, County Westmeath
- Died: 10 August 1892 (aged 49–50); Athlone Workhouse
- Burial place: Cornamagh RC Cemetery
- Military career
- Allegiance: United Kingdom
- Branch: British Army
- Rank: Drummer
- Units: 64th Regiment of Foot
- Conflicts: Indian Mutiny
- Awards: Victoria Cross

Thomas Flynn (also spelled Flinn) VC (August 1842 – 10 August 1892) was born in Athlone and was an Irish recipient of the Victoria Cross, the highest and most prestigious award for gallantry in the face of the enemy that can be awarded to British and Commonwealth forces.

== Victoria Cross ==
Flynn is acknowledged to be one of the two youngest recipients of the Victoria Cross; both he and Andrew Fitzgibbon were 15 years and three months old. His exact date of birth is unknown, but he was 15 years old, and a drummer in the 64th Regiment of Foot (later The North Staffordshire Regiment – The Prince of Wales's), British Army during the Indian Mutiny when the following deed took place on 28 November 1857 at Cawnpore, India, for which he was awarded the Victoria Cross:

Drummer Thomas Flynn

Date of Act of Bravery, 28th November 1857

For conspicuous gallantry, in the charge on the Enemy's guns on the 28th of November 1857, when, being himself wounded, he engaged in a hand-to-hand encounter two of the Rebel Artillerymen.

== Post-army life ==
After he left the army, he fell on hard times and was sent to Athlone Workhouse. His local Member of Parliament, Donal Sullivan, raised the matter in the House of Commons in April 1892. After reference to Flynn's previous gallantry, Sullivan asked the Financial Secretary to the War Office St John Brodrick:

...whether he is aware that Flynn was awarded a pension of £10 a year for his valorous conduct, which sums the Guardians of the Athlone Union appropriate towards his maintenance; and whether some small increase could be made, so as to enable him in his old age to end his days more comfortably than in a workhouse?

Brodrick replied that:

This case is well known at the War Office. Flynn did very gallant service and was awarded the Victoria Cross, but I regret to say that he was discharged with a very bad character, he having been entered in the defaulter-book 47 times, and tried by Court Martial 15 times. The poor man is a victim of drinking to such an extent that when he had control of his money he only left the workhouse for the purpose of drinking up his annuity as soon as received. It would consequently be useless to consider his case for an increase.

Flynn died in the workhouse on 10 August 1892.

A memorial plaque was erected in the Garrison Church, Whittington Barracks, Lichfield, Staffordshire.
