= Elizabeth Harris =

Elizabeth Harris may refer to:

== People ==
- Elizabeth Glover (née Harris; 1602–1643), responsible for bring the first printing press to the Thirteen Colonies
- Elizabeth Harris (died 1812), wife of Supreme Court Justice Thomas Todd
- Elizabeth Underwood (née Harris; 1794–1858), Australian pioneering land owner
- Eliza Harris (Civil War nurse) (1831–1891), volunteer nurse in the American Civil War
- Elizabeth Webber Harris (1834–1917), English nurse awarded a replica Victoria Cross for her work during a cholera outbreak in India
- Liz Harris (actress) (fl. 1962–1993), Australian actress
- Liz Harris (politician), Arizona politician
- Elizabeth Forsling Harris, journalist and the first publisher of Ms. magazine
- Elizabeth Anne Harris (born 1980), American musician, artist and producer musician, stage name Grouper
- Elizabeth Eden Harris (born 1997), American rapper, stage name Cupcakke
- Elizabeth A. Harris, New York Times journalist
- Elizabeth Harris Aitken (1936–2022), married name Harris, Welsh socialite

== Fictional characters ==
- Elizabeth Harris, in the 2011 film Unknown

== See also ==
- Betty Harris (born 1939), American singer
- Betty Harris (scientist) (born 1940), American scientist
- Elizabeth-Jane Harris (born 1988), British cyclist
- Bess Larkin Housser Harris (1890–1969), Canadian painter
- Betsy Harris (born 1972), American basketball coach and player
- Eliza Harris, a character in Uncle Tom's Cabin
