= Thomas Adair =

Thomas Adair may refer to:

- T. B. S. Adair (Thomas Benjamin Stratton Adair, 1868–1928), British admiral and Scottish Unionist Party MP
- Tom Adair (1913–1988), American songwriter and screenwriter

== See also ==
- Thomas Adair Butler (1836–1901), British recipient of the Victoria Cross
