= Samuel Hill Lawrence =

Irish military officer (1831–1868)

- Born: 22 January 1831; Cork, Ireland
- Died: 17 June 1868 (aged 37); Montevideo, Uruguay
- Military career
- Allegiance: United Kingdom
- Branch: British Army
- Service years: 1847–1865
- Rank: Major
- Units: 32nd Regiment of Foot; 25th Regiment of Foot; 8th Hussars; 11th Hussars
- Conflicts: Second Anglo-Sikh War; Indian Mutiny
- Awards: Victoria Cross
- Other work: Thomas Cadell VC (cousin)

Major Samuel Hill Lawrence VC (22 January 1831 – 17 June 1868), born in Cork, was an Irish recipient of the Victoria Cross, the highest and most prestigious award for gallantry in the face of the enemy that can be awarded to British and Commonwealth forces.

== Family ==
His father, also called Samuel Hill, had a military career in the 32nd Regiment of Foot and was wounded at Quatre Bras, the prelude to Waterloo. The Lawrence family formed part of the 'Protestant Ascendancy' in Ireland. Lawrence Snr. may have been master of the Orange Lodge at Nenagh around the year 1825 and is recorded as living at Belmont Cottage, Douglas, near Cork, Ireland in 1837. His mother, Margaret Macdonald, was of Scots origin. He was the cousin of Lieutenant Thomas Cadell VC.

== Details ==
He was 26 years old, and a lieutenant, with a recent field promotion to captain, in the 32nd Regiment of Foot (later The Duke of Cornwall's Light Infantry), British Army during the Indian Mutiny when the following deeds took place on 7 July 1857 and 26 September 1857 at the Siege of Lucknow for which he was awarded the VC.

32nd Regiment of Foot

Lieutenant(now Brevet-Major) Samuel Hill Lawrence Date of Acts of Bravery, 7th July, and 26th September, 1857

For distinguished bravery in a Sortie on the 7th of July, 1857, made, as reported by Major Wilson, late Deputy-Assistant Adjutant-General of the Lucknow Garrison, for the purpose of examining a house strongly held by the Enemy, in order to discover whether or not a mine was being driven from it. Major Wilson states that he saw the attack, and was an eye-witness to the great personal gallantry of Major Lawrence on the occasion, he being the first person to mount the ladder, and enter the window of the house, in effecting which he had his pistol knocked out of his hand by one of the Enemy:—also, for distinguished gallantry in a Sortie, on the 26 September 1857, in charging with two of his men, in advance of his Company, and capturing a 9-pounder gun.

He was recommended, by the board of officers which considered the claims of almost all those members of the 32nd Foot for Lucknow-related VCs, for a VC with bar. This suggestion was not taken up in later stages of the process. According to the fourth 'clause' of the original warrant creating the V.C., he would only have been eligible for a bar if he had already been decorated before the second V.C. action.

== Further information ==
He later joined the 25th Regiment of Foot, 8th Hussars and ended his military career, in 1865, with the rank of major in the 11th Hussars.

The United Services Gazette of 15 August 1868 (p8) reported that 'Major Samuel Hill Lawrence V.C., late of the 11th Hussars, died on 17 June at Estancia del Arazati (sic) Monte Video (sic), South America aged 37.' (15)Uruguay 17 June 1868. In fact, Arazatí is in the 'departamento' ('province') of San Jose, not Montevideo. Research at both Montevideo, including the British Cemetery which is often quoted as his burial place, and Arazatí has, so far, failed to reveal his final resting place.

== The medal ==
His Victoria Cross is displayed at the Duke of Cornwall's Light Infantry Museum, Bodmin, Cornwall. Lawrence's campaign medals and miniatures are also on display at the museum. They were donated by a member of the Richards family, into which Lawrence's only surviving sister had married.
