= William Oxenham =

English Victoria Cross recipient (1823-1875)

- Born: July 1823; Tiverton, Devon
- Died: 29 December 1875 (aged 52); Exeter, Devon
- Burial place: Higher Cemetery, Exeter
- Military career
- Allegiance: United Kingdom
- Branch: British Army
- Rank: Corporal
- Units: 32nd Regiment of Foot
- Conflicts: Second Anglo-Sikh War; Indian Mutiny
- Awards: Victoria Cross

William Oxenham VC (July 1823 – 29 December 1875) was an English recipient of the Victoria Cross, the highest and most prestigious award for gallantry in the face of the enemy that can be awarded to British and Commonwealth forces.

== Details ==
He was about 33 years old, and a corporal in the 32nd Regiment of Foot (later The Duke of Cornwall's Light Infantry), British Army during the Indian Mutiny when the following deed took place on 30 June 1857 at Siege of Lucknow, for which he was awarded the Victoria Cross:

For distinguished gallantry in saving the life of Mr. Capper, of the Bengal Civil Service, by extricating him from the ruins of a Verandah which had fallen on him, Corporal Oxenham being for ten minutes exposed to a heavy fire, while doing so

== The medal ==
His Victoria Cross is displayed at the Duke of Cornwall's Light Infantry Museum, Bodmin, Cornwall as are his campaign and good conduct medals.
