= 101st Regiment of Foot (Royal Bengal Fusiliers) =

- c. 1862 regimental busby badge for other ranks
- Active: 1652–1881
- Country: East India Company (1652–1858); United Kingdom (1862–1881)
- Branch: Bengal Army (1756–1862); British Army (1862–1881)
- Type: Infantry
- Role: Line infantry
- Size: One battalion (1756–1786, 1803–1822, 1829–1881); Two battalions (1798–1803, 1822–1829); Three battalions (1786–1798)
- Garrison/HQ: Ballymullen Barracks, Tralee
- Engagements: Seven Years' War; First Rohilla War; Second Anglo-Mysore War; First Anglo-Maratha War; Second Rohilla War; Second Anglo-Maratha War; Napoleonic Wars; Third Anglo-Maratha War; First Anglo-Afghan War; First Anglo-Sikh War; Second Anglo-Burmese War; Indian Rebellion of 1857; Ambela Campaign

The 101st Regiment of Foot (Royal Bengal Fusiliers) was a line infantry regiment of the Bengal Army and British Army. It was raised by the East India Company (EIC) in Bengal in 1652 as a guard of honour composed of European troops and initially protected the EIC's factories along the Hooghly River. In 1756 the unit became part of the newly raised Bengal Army and combined with the EIC's other independent companies of European troops to form the Bengal European Regiment. The regiment was renamed the 1st Bengal European Regiment in 1765 and 1st Bengal European Battalion in 1783 before reverting to the name of "Bengal European Regiment" in 1803.

The regiment fought in several major wars of the British conquest of India along with serving in the Napoleonic Wars, being renamed the 1st Bengal (European) Light Infantry in 1840, 1st Bengal European Fusiliers in 1846, 1st Bengal Fusiliers in 1859 and 1st Royal Bengal Fusiliers in 1861. Following the Indian Rebellion of 1857 the regiment became part of the British army in 1862 and was renamed the "101st Regiment of Foot (Royal Bengal Fusiliers)". The regiment proceeded to serve in the North-West Frontier, England, Malta and Cyprus and Canada. Under the Childers Reforms the regiment was amalgamated with the 104th Regiment of Foot (Bengal Fusiliers) to form the Royal Munster Fusiliers in 1881.

== History ==
=== Formation and consolidation of British rule ===
The regiment was raised by the East India Company (EIC) in Bengal in 1652 as a company-sized guard of honour composed of an ensign and 30 other ranks, all of whom were European. In 1685 the unit was expanded when it was reinforced by six companies which had arrived from England, and in 1689 the unit was moved to Madras as a result of the ongoing Anglo-Mughal war, though one company returned to Bengal in the next year; in 1694 that company was reduced to four non-commissioned officers and 20 privates. The unit was involved during its early existence in guarding EIC factories on the Hooghly River.

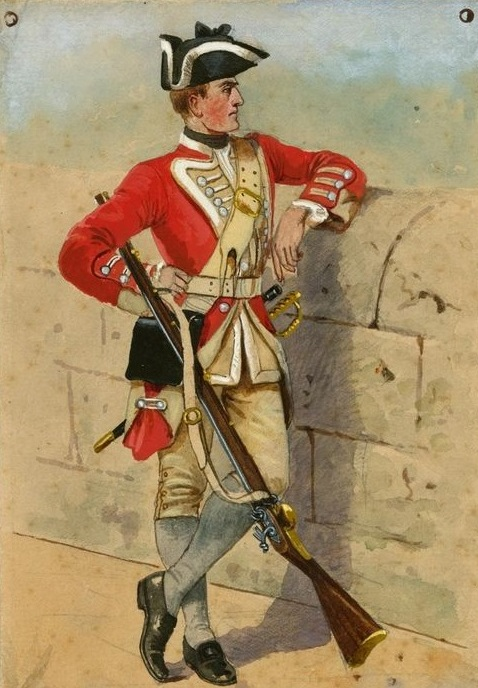
A regimental private in 1756

On 16 December 1756 under Robert Clive's direction the unit was amalgamated with the Company's other independent companies composed of white troops to form the Bengal European Regiment, a line infantry regiment of the newly raised Bengal Army. The regiment served in the Third Carnatic War, participating in the Battle of Plassey on 23 June 1757, the Battle of Condore on 9 December 1758 and the siege of Masulipatam in early 1759. It also fought at the Battle of Buxar in October 1764 during the Bengal War. The regiment, numbering 1,600 officers and other ranks, was renamed the 1st Bengal European Regiment on 5 August 1765 due to the raising of the 2nd Bengal European Regiment and 3rd Bengal European Regiment; a number of regimental troops were transferred to form the two newly raised regiments.

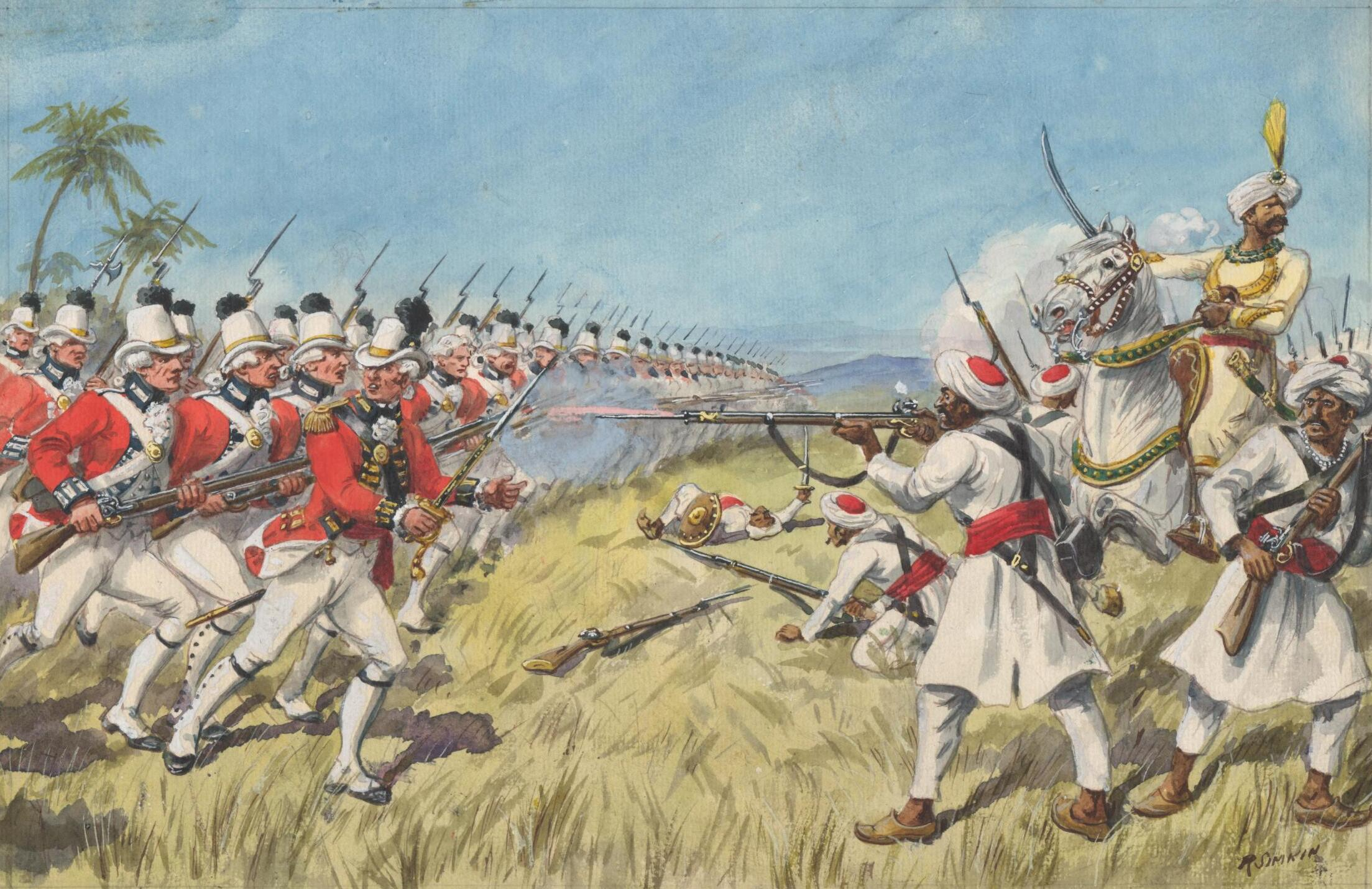
Regimental troops at the siege of Cuddalore

With its ruling status in Bengal confirmed the East India Company began to expand its influence into neighbouring regions and the regiment took part in an engagement against the Kingdom of Rohilkhand's army at the Battle of Miranpur Katra on 23 April 1774 during the First Rohilla War. On 26 September 1779 a second regimental battalion was raised. During the Second Anglo-Mysore War the regiment fought at the Battle of Sholinghur on 27 September 1781 and in skirmishes against the Maratha army around Gujarat in 1782 during the First Anglo-Maratha War. In 1783 the regiment took part in the siege of Cuddalore against a Franco-Mysorean garrison before being downgraded from a regiment to a battalion and being accordingly renamed the 1st Bengal European Battalion. On 26 October 1794 the battalion participated in the Battle of Bithaura during the Second Rohilla War.

=== Early nineteenth century ===
The regiment went on to fight at the Battle of Deeg in November 1804 during the Second Anglo-Maratha War. With the outbreak of the Napoleonic Wars in Europe, the Royal Bengal Fusiliers would find themselves guarding Britain's interests in Asia for much of the early nineteenth century. Two companies were deployed to Macau in China, which the British had taken over from the Portuguese following the French occupation of Portugal, in September 1808 but returned to India in December 1808. A detachment went to the Dutch East Indies in 1810 and other detachments to Nepal and the Maluku Islands in 1814. The regiment saw some combat in skirmishes with the Pindaris in 1817 during the Third Anglo-Maratha War. After that it took part in operations against the Jat people in December 1825 during the Siege of Bharatpur.

=== Victorian era ===
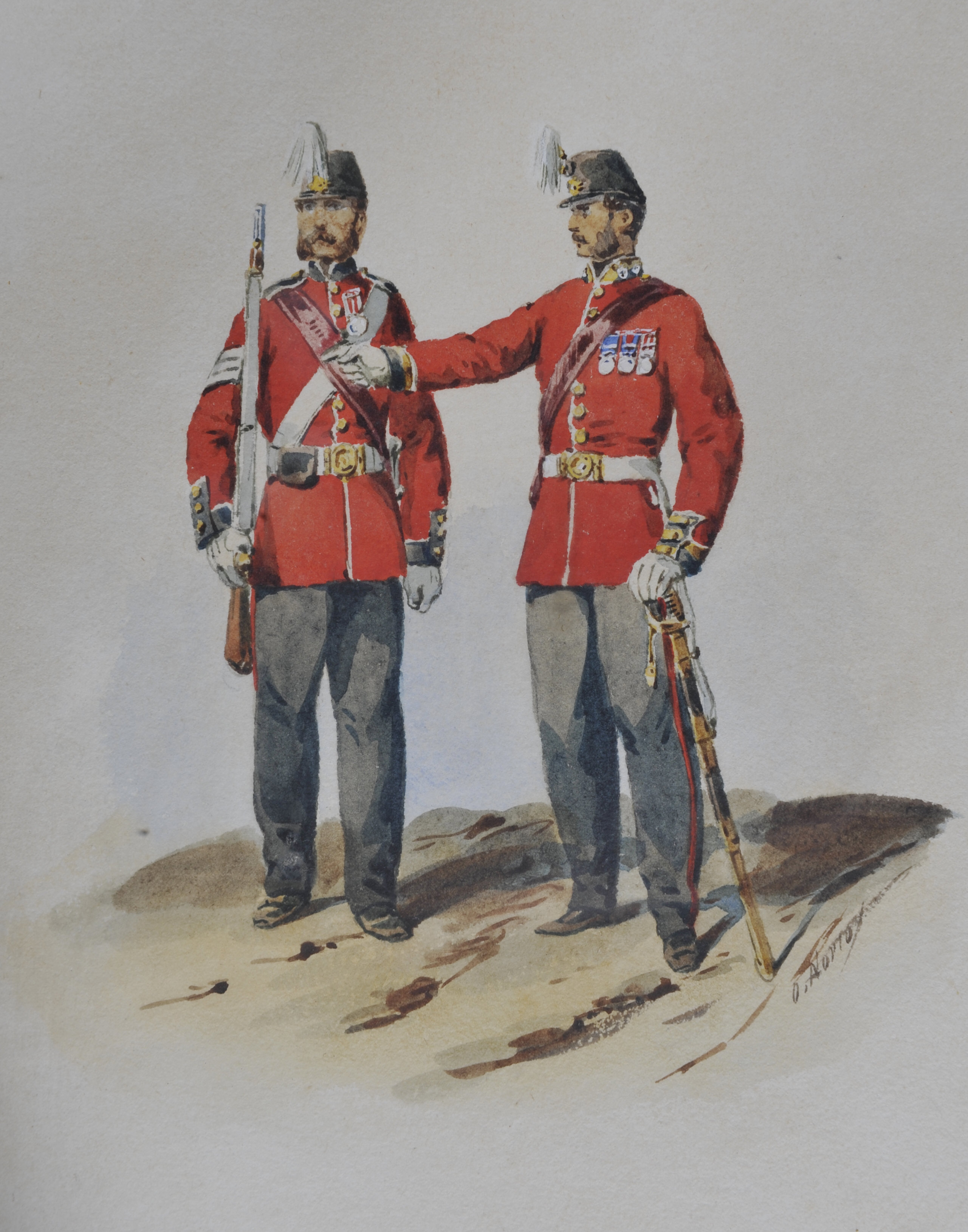
Regimental sergeant and officer in 1855–1862

The regiment was deployed to Afghanistan in 1838 and saw action at the Battle of Ghazni in July 1839 during the First Anglo-Afghan War. Renamed the 1st Bengal (European) Light Infantry in 1840, it fought at the Battle of Ferozeshah in December 1845 and the Battle of Sobraon in February 1846 during the First Anglo-Sikh War. It became the 1st Bengal European Fusiliers, also referred to in contemporary official papers, with inverted word ordering, as 1st European Bengal Fusiliers, in April 1846. It was deployed to the Province of Pegu in April 1852 during the Second Anglo-Burmese War.

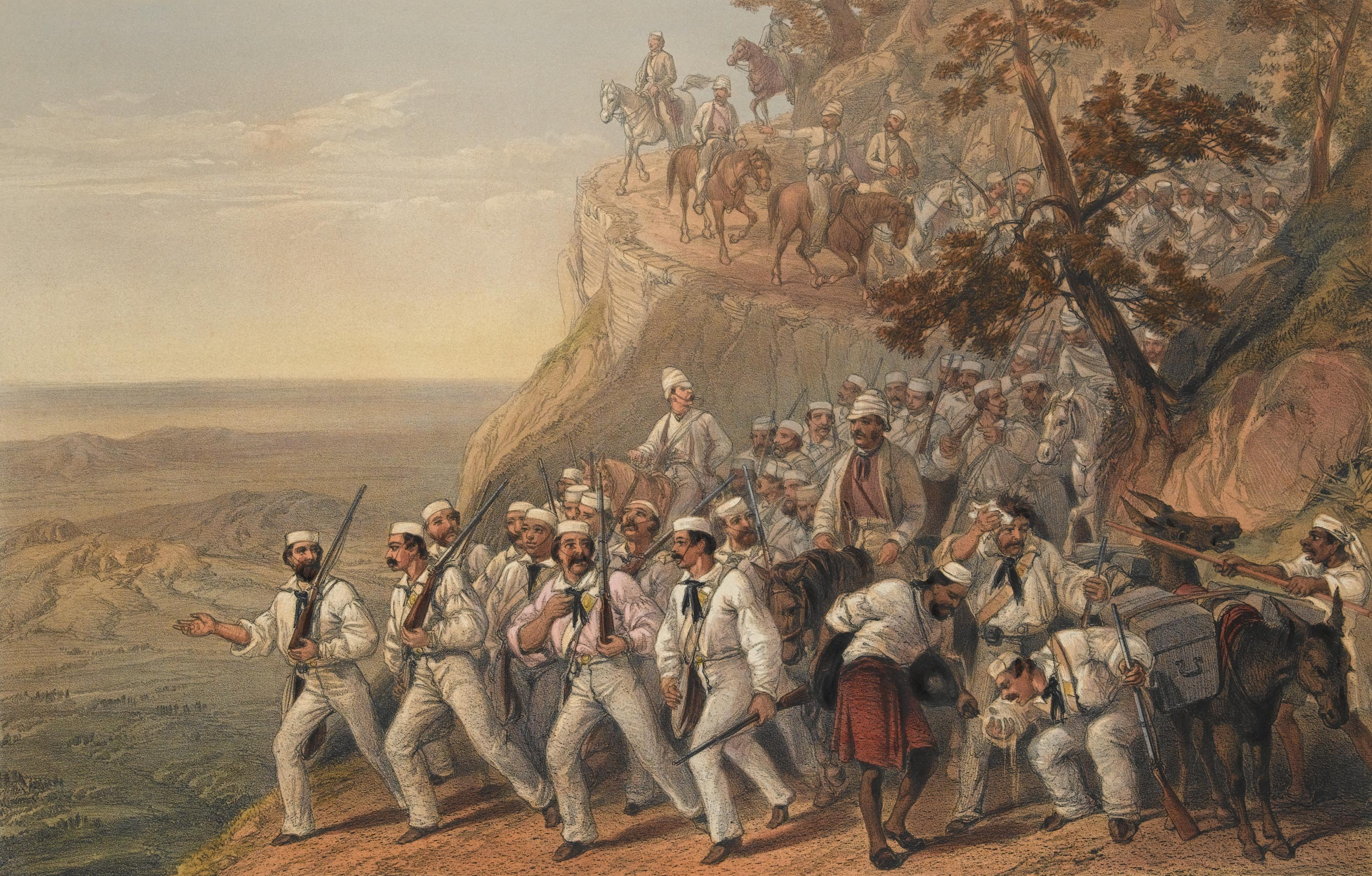
Regimental troops marching to Ambala during the Indian Rebellion of 1857

On the outbreak of the Indian Rebellion of 1857 the order to march on Delhi was issued by Army Command in Shimla, and reached the regiment at Dagshai through Major George Ogle Jacob on 13 May 1857. After receiving the order, the regiment marched down from its rest station at Dagshai and was due to reach Umballa that evening. Jacob was mortally wounded at the Siege of Delhi on 14 September 1857. His grave at Rajpura Cemetery, Delhi states: "Sacred to the memory of Major George Ogle Jacob, 1st Bengal Fusiliers, who whilst commanding his Regiment fell mortally wounded at the storming of Delhi, on the 14th September 1857, aged 38 years. This monument is erected by his family." The regiment went on to take part in the Capture of Lucknow in March 1858. Five members of the regiment were awarded the Victoria Cross for their actions during the rebellion.

After the Crown took control of the Presidency armies in the aftermath of the Indian Rebellion, the regiment became the 1st Bengal Fusiliers in November 1859 and then the 1st Royal Bengal Fusiliers in May 1861. It was then renumbered as the 101st Regiment of Foot (Royal Bengal Fusiliers) on transfer to the British Army in September 1862. (Note: "Her Majesty's Government have expressed an anxious desire to preserve the proud recollections of distinguished service which belong especially to the older Regiments of each Presidency, and to incorporate with Her Majesty's Army, Corps which have so greatly contributed to the acquisition and maintenance of Her Majesty's Dominions in the East. Her Majesty having graciously determined to mark Her estimation of the services of Her Indian Armies, by conferring the designation of "Royal" upon three of the European Regiments, and by selecting for this honour one Regiment from each Presidency...has much gratification in announcing that the following Regiments will henceforward bear the honourable designation of "Royal" Regiments...The 1st Bengal Fusiliers. The...older Regiments in the several Presidencies will thus be converted into Regiments of Her Majesty's General Army, and will be numbered and designated as follows...The 101st Regiment of Foot (Royal Bengal Fusiliers).) The regiment took part in the Ambela Campaign in 1863 and then embarked for England in late 1868. It was sent to Malta in October 1874 and transferred to Cyprus in July 1878 before setting sail for Halifax, Nova Scotia in November 1878.

As part of the Cardwell Reforms of the 1870s, where single-battalion regiments were linked together to share a single depot and recruiting district in the United Kingdom, the 101st was linked with the 104th Regiment of Foot (Bengal Fusiliers), and assigned to district no. 70 at Ballymullen Barracks in Tralee. On 1 July 1881 the Childers Reforms came into effect and the regiment amalgamated with the 104th Regiment of Foot (Bengal Fusiliers) to form the Royal Munster Fusiliers.

== Battle honours ==
Battle honours awarded to the regiment were:

- Plassey
- Condore
- Buxar
- Rohilcund 1774
- Sholinghur
- Guzerat
- Deig
- Bhurtpore
- Ghuznee 1838
- Afghanistan 1839
- Ferozeshah
- Sobraon
- Pegu
- Delhi, 1857
- Lucknow

== Victoria Crosses ==
- Lieutenant Francis Brown, Indian Mutiny (16 November 1857)
- Lieutenant Thomas Adair Butler, Indian Mutiny (9 March 1858)
- Private John McGovern, Indian Mutiny (23 June 1857)
- Sergeant James McGuire, Indian Mutiny (14 September 1857)
- Drummer Miles Ryan, Indian Mutiny (14 September 1857)

== Colonels of the regiment ==
Colonels of the regiment included:

101st Regiment of Foot (Royal Bengal Fusiliers)

- 1862–1873: Lt-Gen. Sir Abraham Roberts, GCB
- 1873–1881: Gen. Corbet Cotton
