= Henry Gore-Browne =

Irish recipient of the Victoria Cross

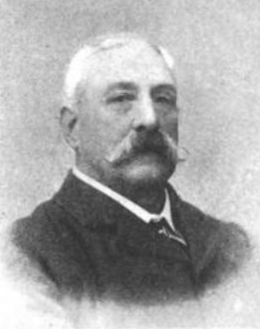
- Born: Henry George Browne; 30 September 1830; Newtown, County Roscommon
- Died: 15 November 1912 (aged 82); Shanklin, Isle of Wight
- Burial place: St Mary the Virgin Churchyard, Brook, Isle of Wight
- Education: Trinity College Dublin
- Military career
- Allegiance: United Kingdom
- Branch: British Army
- Rank: Colonel
- Units: 32nd Regiment of Foot; 100th Regiment of Foot
- Conflicts: Indian Mutiny
- Awards: Victoria Cross
- Other work: Deputy Governor of the Isle of Wight

Colonel Henry George Gore-Browne VC (30 September 1830 – 15 November 1912) was born in Newtown, County Roscommon and was an Irish recipient of the Victoria Cross, the highest and most prestigious award for gallantry in the face of the enemy that can be awarded to British and Commonwealth forces.

== Family ==
Henry George Browne was the son of Arthur Browne, Esq. (died 1870), and his wife Anna Elizabeth Clements, daughter of Captain Clements. He was a great-great-grandson of the 1st Earl of Altamont, whose heir is the Marquess of Sligo. His great-grandfather was The Right Hon. Arthur Browne MP, of Leixlip Castle.

He was educated at Trinity College Dublin. He married Jane Anne Seely, daughter of Charles Seely, on 10 April 1882. She was the sister of Sir Charles Seely, 1st Baronet, and the aunt of J. E. B. Seely, 1st Baron Mottistone. They lived at Pitt Place House, Mottistone, on the Isle of Wight.

== Details ==
He was 26 years old, and a captain in the 32nd Regiment of Foot (later The Duke of Cornwall's Light Infantry) in the British Army during the Indian Mutiny when the following deed took place on 21 August 1857 during the Siege of Lucknow for which he was awarded the VC:

For conspicuous bravery in having, on the 21st of August, 1857, during the Siege of the Lucknow Residency, gallantly led a Sortie at great personal risk, for the purpose of spiking two heavy guns, which were doing considerable damage, to the defences. It appears from the statements of the non-commissioned officers and men who accompanied Captain Browne on the occasion, that he was the first person who entered the Battery, which consisted of the two guns in question, protected by high pallisades, the embrasures being closed with sliding shutters. On reaching the Battery, Captain Browne removed the shutters, and jumped into the Battery. The result was, that the guns were spiked, and it is supposed that about one hundred of the enemy were killed.

== Further information ==
He later achieved the rank of colonel of the 100th Regiment of Foot. He served as Magistrate for Hampshire and became a Deputy Governor of the Isle of Wight. He died at Shanklin on the Isle of Wight on 15 November 1912. He changed his name by deed poll in 1915 from Henry George Browne to Henry George Gore-Browne.
