= John McGovern (VC) =

Irish recipient of the Victoria Cross (1825–1888)

- Born: 16 May 1825; Tullyhaw, County Cavan
- Died: 22 November 1888 (aged 63); Hamilton, Ontario, Canada
- Burial place: Holy Sepulchre Cemetery, Hamilton
- Military career
- Allegiance: United Kingdom
- Branch: Bengal Army
- Service years: 1845–1862
- Rank: Corporal
- Unit: 1st Bengal European Fusiliers
- Conflicts: Second Anglo-Burmese War; Indian Mutiny
- Awards: Victoria Cross

John McGovern VC (16 May 1825 – 22 November 1888) (Also known as McGowan) was an Irish recipient of the Victoria Cross, the highest and most prestigious award for gallantry in the face of the enemy that can be awarded to British and Commonwealth forces.

== Biography ==
McGovern was born in the parish of Templeport in Tullyhaw, County Cavan, Ireland. At age 32, he was a private in the 1st Bengal European Fusiliers (later The Royal Munster Fusiliers), Bengal Army during the Indian Mutiny when the following deed took place on 23 June 1857 at Delhi, India for which he was awarded the VC:

For gallant conduct during the operations before Delhi, but more especially on the 23rd of June, 1857, when he carried into camp a wounded comrade under a very heavy fire from the enemy's battery, at the risk of his own life.

McGovern emigrated to Canada and died in Hamilton, Ontario, in November 1888.

His Victoria Cross is displayed at the National Army Museum (Chelsea, England).
