= James McGuire (VC) =

Irish recipient of the Victoria Cross

James McGuire VC
- Born: c. 1827; Enniskillen, County Fermanagh, Ireland
- Died: 22 December 1862 (aged 34–35); Derry, Ireland
- Burial place: Donagh Cemetery
- Military career
- Allegiance: United Kingdom
- Branch: Bengal Army
- Service years: 1849–1859
- Rank: Sergeant
- Units: 1st Bengal European Fusiliers
- Conflicts: Second Anglo-Burmese War; Indian Mutiny
- Awards: Victoria Cross (forfeited)

James McGuire VC (c. 1827 – 22 December 1862) was an Irish recipient of the Victoria Cross, the highest British military decoration. It was awarded for gallantry in the face of the enemy. The VC was later forfeited.

== Details ==
McGuire was about 30 years old and a sergeant in the 1st Bengal European Fusiliers (later the Royal Munster Fusiliers), Bengal Army, during the Indian Mutiny when the following deed took place on 14 September 1857 at Delhi, for which he together with Drummer Miles Ryan was awarded the VC:

Serjeant J. McGuire, Drummer M. Ryan

Date of Act of Bravery, 14th September, 1857

At the assault on Delhi on the 14th September, 1857, when the Brigade had reached the Cabul Gate, the 1st Fusiliers and 75th Regiment, and some Sikhs, were waiting for orders, and some of the Regiments were getting ammunition served out (three boxes of which exploded from some cause not clearly known, and two others were in a state of ignition), when Serjeant McGuire and Drummer Ryan rushed into the burning mass, and, seizing the boxes, threw them, one after the other, over the parapet into the water. The confusion consequent on the explosion was very great, and the crowd of soldiers and native followers, who did not know where the danger lay, were rushing into certain destruction, when Serjeant McGuire and Drummer Ryan, by their coolness and personal daring, saved the lives of many at the risk of their own.

== Further information ==
McGuire's VC was forfeited after he was convicted of stealing a cow, making him one of eight men to lose their VCs. He died in Derry, Ireland, 22 December 1862.

== Medal's location ==
His Victoria Cross is displayed at the National Army Museum in Chelsea, England.

== See also ==
- The Register of the Victoria Cross (1981, 1988 and 1997)
