= 32nd (Cornwall) Regiment of Foot =

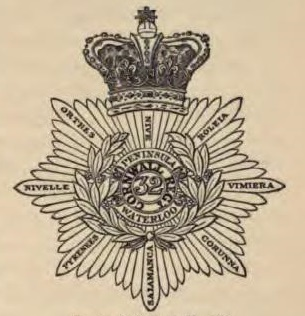
- Badge of the 32nd (Cornwall) Regiment of Foot
- Active: 1702–1881
- Country: Kingdom of England (1702–1707) Kingdom of Great Britain (1707–1801) United Kingdom (1801–1881)
- Branch: British Army
- Garrison/HQ: Victoria Barracks, Bodmin
- March: One and All
- Engagements: War of the Spanish Succession; War of the Austrian Succession; Napoleonic Wars; Lower Canada Rebellion; Second Anglo-Sikh War; Indian Rebellion
- Battle honours: Gibraltar 1705

The 32nd Regiment of Foot was an infantry regiment of the British Army, raised in 1702. Under the Childers Reforms it amalgamated with the 46th (South Devonshire) Regiment of Foot to form the Duke of Cornwall's Light Infantry in 1881.

== History ==
=== Early wars ===
The regiment was first raised by Colonel Edward Fox as Edward Fox’s Regiment of Marines in 1702 to fight in the War of the Spanish Succession. Elements of the regiment joined the fleet which sailed from Spithead in July 1702 and saw action as marines at the Battle of Vigo Bay in October 1702. The marines returned to England in November 1702. The regiment also took part in the capture and defence of Gibraltar in July 1704 and suffered very heavy losses at the Battle of Almansa in April 1707. It was disbanded in 1713 but re-raised as Jacob Borr’s Regiment of Foot in 1714. It then served in Ireland from 1716 to 1734.

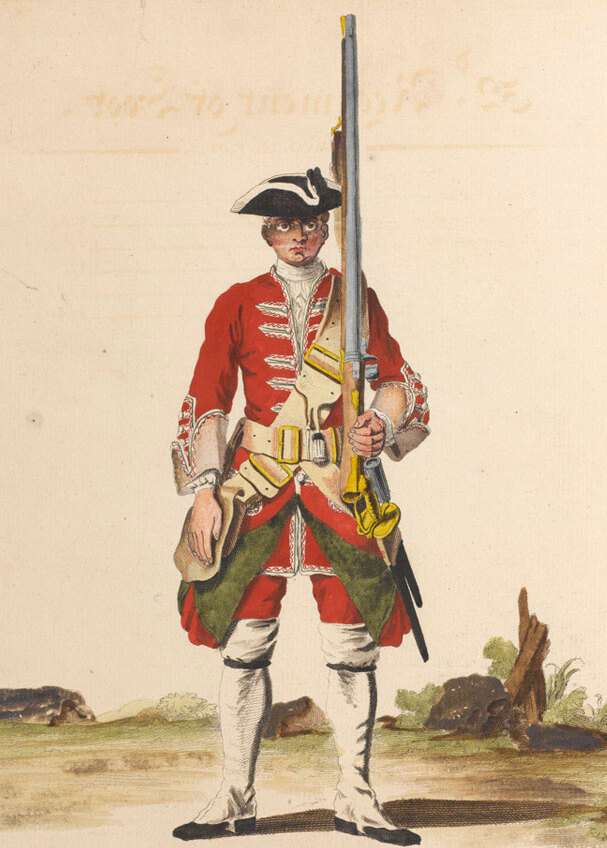
c. 1742 engraving of a regimental private

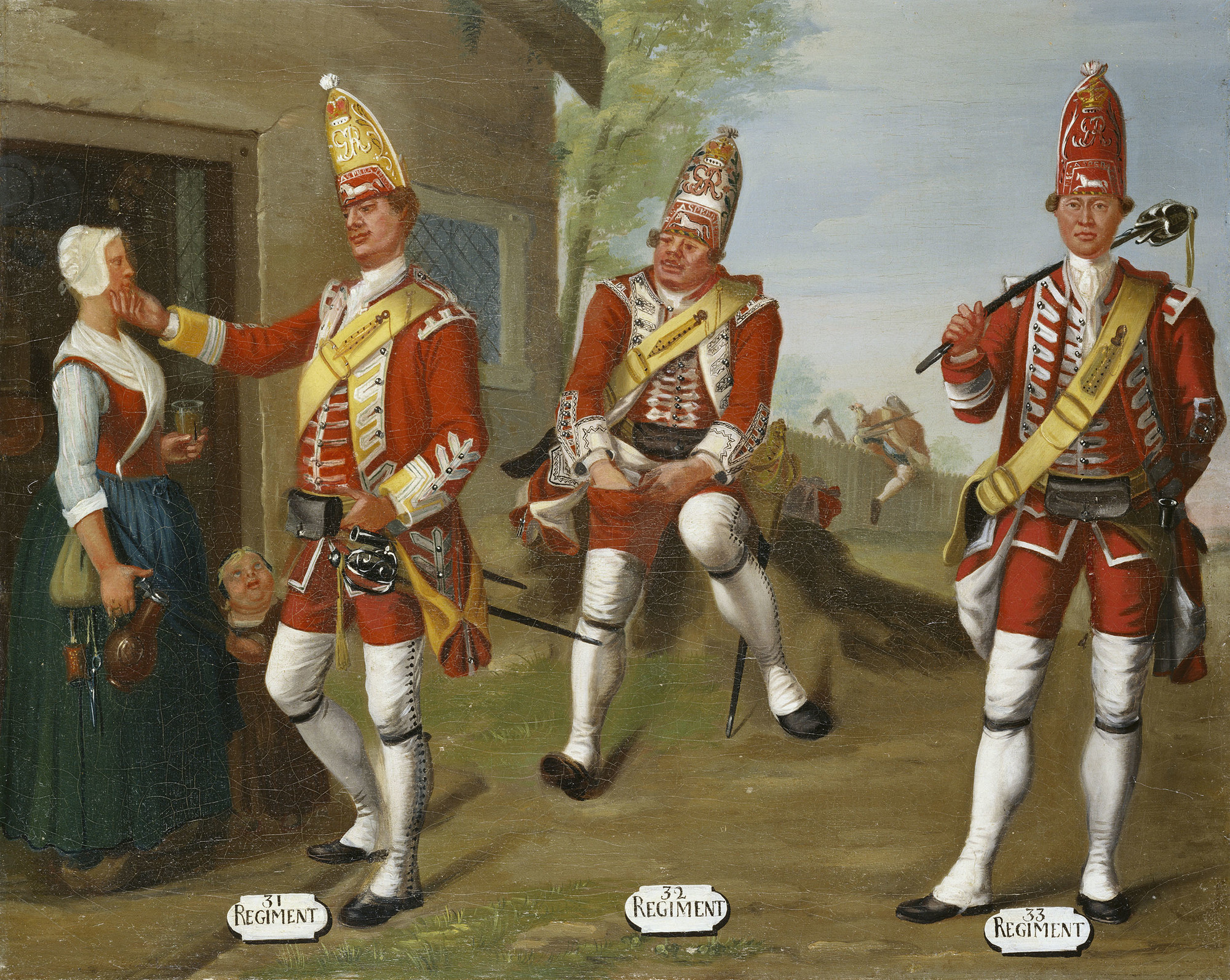
c. 1751 painting of a regimental grenadier (centre)

In summer 1742 the regiment was despatched to Belgium for service in the War of the Austrian Succession: it was held in reserve at the Battle of Dettingen in June 1743. but fought at the Battle of Fontenoy in May 1745. The regiment returned to England in October 1745 and were stationed in Lancashire during the Jacobite rising in 1745. On 1 July 1751 a royal warrant was issued declaring that in future regiments were no longer to be known by their colonel's name, but by the "Number or Rank of the Regiment". Accordingly, General Francis Leighton's Regiment was renamed as the 32nd Regiment of Foot.

In late 1775, Rockingham Castle, which had been hired to transport three companies of the regiment, along with a number of their families, making for Cobh in a heavy gale, mistook Robert's Cove for the entrance to Cork harbour, and was driven onto a lee shore at Reannie's Bay, a few miles distant. The master and crew of the ship were drowned, as were about ninety of the passengers. In 1782 all regiments of the line without a royal title were given a county designation and the regiment became the 32nd (Cornwall) Regiment of Foot. In 1796 the regiment was deployed to Saint-Domingue as part of the response to a rebellion there but one of the transport ships was captured by the French Navy and some soldiers from the regiment, along with Lieutenant General Frederick Wetherall, became prisoners of war. The regiment were also sent to Dublin as part of the response to the Irish rebellion in 1803.

=== Napoleonic Wars ===
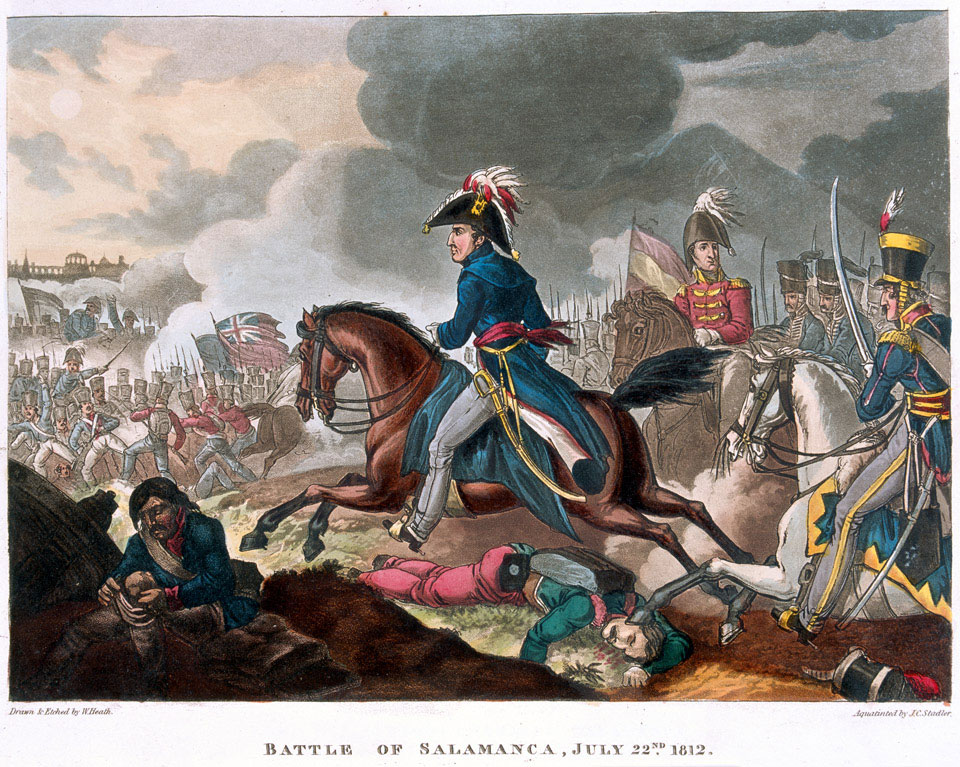
The Battle of Salamanca at which the regiment contributed to the storming parties

The regiment was deployed to Denmark in July 1807 and were ordered aboard the captured Danish ships as marines at the Battle of Copenhagen in August 1807 during the Gunboat War.

The regiment landed in Portugal in June 1808, and under General Sir Arthur Wellesley, fought in the Battle of Roliça and the Battle of Vimeiro in August 1808. The regiment fought under General Sir John Moore in the retreat to Corunna, and on returning to England they were part of the Walcheren Campaign in the Netherlands where many were struck down with malaria. After being reinforced the regiment returned to Spain in June 1811, and contributed to the storming parties in the attack on San Vicente fort at Salamanca and then served at the Battle of Salamanca in July 1812. The regiment pursued the French Army into France and saw action again at the Battle of the Pyrenees in July 1813, the Battle of Nivelle in November 1813 and the Battle of the Nive in December 1813 as well as the Battle of Orthez in February 1814.

During the Napoleonic Wars the regiment had white facings on its uniform and the officer's lace and buttons were gold. The officer's jackets were unlaced, with 10 twist buttonholes placed in pairs. The jacket of the other ranks had 10 square loops spaced in pairs. The regiment fought at the Battle of Quatre Bras, arriving about 3 pm on 16 June 1815 just in time to help halt the French advance. Two days later at Battle of Waterloo the regiment was stationed opposite the French main attacks, standing their ground before attacking Napoleon's assaulting troops. The 1st Battalion of the regiment was part of the 8th British Brigade commanded by Major-General James Kempt, which was in turn part of the 5th British Infantry Division under Lieutenant-General Thomas Picton. The regiment was commanded on the field by Lieutenant-Colonel John Hicks and numbered at 503 men at the battle of Waterloo having suffered casualties at Quatre Bras. It was two men of the regiment's Grenadier company who bore Pictons's body away after he was fatally shot through the head.

=== The Victorian era ===
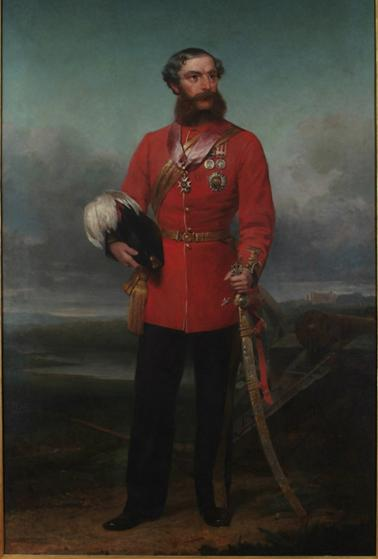
Sir John Inglis of the 32nd Regiment by William Gush, Province House (Nova Scotia)

The regiment was sent to Canada in June 1830 and fought at the Battle of Saint-Denis in November 1837 and at the Battle of Saint-Eustache in December 1837 during the Lower Canada Rebellion. The regiment also saw action at the Siege of Multan in autumn 1848 and at the Battle of Gujrat in February 1849 during the Second Anglo-Sikh War.

The regiment defended Lucknow from July to November 1857, Victoria Crosses being awarded to William Dowling, Henry Gore-Browne, Samuel Lawrence and William Oxenham. The regiment's commanding officer, Colonel John Inglis, was in overall command of the Lucknow Residency during the siege. The regiment was retitled the 32nd (Cornwall) Regiment of Foot (Light Infantry) in recognition of its contribution during the rebellion.

As part of the Cardwell Reforms of the 1870s, where single-battalion regiments were linked together to share a single depot and recruiting district in the United Kingdom, the 32nd was linked with the 46th (South Devonshire) Regiment of Foot, and assigned to district no. 35 at Victoria Barracks, Bodmin. On 1 July 1881 the Childers Reforms came into effect and the regiment amalgamated with the 46th (South Devonshire) Regiment of Foot to form the Duke of Cornwall's Light Infantry. The home church of the 32nd Regiment where regimental colours are retired is St. Petroc's Church located in Bodmin, Cornwall.

== Battle honours ==
Battle honours gained by the regiment were:

- Peninsular War: Roliça, Vimiera, Corunna, Salamanca, Pyrenees, Nivelle, Nive, Orthes, Peninsula
- Waterloo
- Second Anglo-Sikh War: Goojerat, Mooltan, Punjaub
- Indian Mutiny: Lucknow
- Dettingen (awarded to successor regiment, 1882)
- Gibraltar 1704–05 (awarded to successor regiment, 1909)

== Victoria Crosses ==
- Private William Dowling, Indian Mutiny (4 July 1857 and 27 September 1857)
- Captain Henry Gore-Browne, Indian Mutiny (21 August 1857)
- Lieutenant Samuel Lawrence Indian Mutiny (7 July 1857 and 26 September 1857)
- Corporal William Oxenham Indian Mutiny (30 June 1857)

== Regimental Colonels ==
Colonels of the Regiment were:

Name	Date of Appointment	Notes
Col. Beville Skelton	1672	Disbanded 1674
Col. Beville Skelton	9 October 1688	Disbanded 1701
Col. Edward Fox	12 February 1702	Disbanded 1713
Brig-Gen. Jacob Borr	5 December 1714	
Brig-Gen. Charles Dubourgay	28 June 1723	
Brig-Gen. Thomas Paget	28 July 1732	
Col. Simon Descury	15 December 1738	
Gen. John Huske	25 December 1740	
Lt-Gen. Henry Skelton	27 August 1743	
Brig-Gen. William Douglas	29 May 1745	
Gen. Francis Leighton	1 December 1747	

32nd Regiment of Foot – (1751)

Col. Robert Robinson	11 June 1773
Lt-Gen. William Amherst	18 October 1775
Gen. The Earl of Ross	17 May 1781

32nd (the Cornwall) Regiment of Foot – (1782)

Gen. James Ogilvie	4 September 1802
Gen. Alexander Campbell	15 February 1813
Lt-Gen. Sir Samuel Venables Hinde, K.C.B.	28 February 1832
Gen. Sir Robert Macfarlane, K.C.B.	26 September 1837
Lt-Gen. Sir John Buchan, K.C.B.	12 June 1843
Sir Richard Armstrong, K.C.B.	25 June 1850
Gen. Sir Willoughby Cotton, G.C.B., K.C.B.	17 April 1854

32nd (The Cornwall) Regiment Foot (Light Infantry) – (1858)

Sir John Eardley Inglis, K.C.B.	5 May 1860
Gen. Henry Dundas, 3rd Viscount Melville, K.C.B.	17 October 1862
Gen. Sir George Brown, G.C.B.	1 April 1863
Lt-Gen. William George Gold	28 August 1865
Gen. Sir George Bell, K.C.B.	2 February 1867
Lord Frederick Paulet, C.B.	3 August 1868
Gen. Sir William Jones, K.C.B.	2 January 1871

== Sources ==
- Adkin, Mark (2001). The Waterloo Companion. Aurum Press. ISBN 978-1854107640.
- Franklin, Carl (2010). British Napoleonic Uniforms (revised ed.). Spellmount. ISBN 978-1-86227-484-6.
- Ross-Lewin, Henry (2009). With the "Thirty-Second" in the Peninsular and Other Campaigns. Leonaur. ISBN 978-0-85706-257-4.
- Swiney, Colonel G. C. (1893). Historical records of 32 (Cornwall) Light Infantry 1702-1892. London: Simkin, Marshall, Hamilton, Kent & Co.
