= Miles Ryan =

Recipient of the Victoria Cross

- Born: c. 1826; Derry, County Londonderry
- Died: January 1887 (aged 60); Bengal, British India
- Military career
- Allegiance: United Kingdom
- Branch: Bengal Army
- Service years: 1848 - 1859
- Rank: Drummer
- Units: 1st Bengal European Fusiliers
- Conflicts: Indian Mutiny
- Awards: Victoria Cross

Miles Ryan VC (c. 1826 – January 1887) was an Irish recipient of the Victoria Cross, the highest and most prestigious award for gallantry in the face of the enemy that can be awarded to British and Commonwealth forces.

Ryan was about 31 years old, and a drummer in the 1st Bengal European Fusiliers during the Indian Mutiny when the following deed took place for which he and James McGuire were awarded the VC.

Serjeant J. McGuire, Drummer M. Ryan

Date of Act of Bravery, 14th September, 1857

At the assault on Delhi on the 14th September, 1857, when the Brigade had reached the Cabul Gate, the 1st Fusiliers and 75th Regiment, and some Sikhs, were waiting for orders, and some of the Regiments were getting ammunition served out (three boxes of which exploded from some cause not clearly known, and two others were in a state of ignition), when Serjeant McGuire and Drummer Ryan rushed into the burning mass, and, seizing the boxes, threw them, one after the other, over the parapet into the water. The confusion consequent on the explosion was very great, and the crowd of soldiers and native followers, who did not know where the danger lay, were rushing into certain destruction, when Serjeant McGuire and Drummer Ryan, by their coolness and personal daring, saved the lives of many at the risk of their own.

He died in Bengal, British India in January 1887.
