= William Dowling (VC) =

Irish Victoria Cross recipient (1825–1887)

- Born: c. 1825; Thomastown, County Kilkenny
- Died: 17 February 1887 (aged 61-62); Liverpool, England
- Burial place: Liverpool RC Cemetery
- Military career
- Allegiance: United Kingdom
- Branch: British Army
- Rank: Sergeant
- Units: 32nd Regiment of Foot
- Conflicts: Indian Mutiny
- Awards: Victoria Cross

William Dowling VC (c. 1825 – 17 February 1887), born in Thomastown, County Kilkenny, was an Irish recipient of the Victoria Cross, the highest and most prestigious award for gallantry in the face of the enemy that can be awarded to British and Commonwealth forces.

== Details ==
Dowling was approximately 32 years old and a private in the 32nd Regiment of Foot (later the Duke of Cornwall's Light Infantry), British Army during the Indian Mutiny when he was awarded the VC for the following deeds during the Siege of Lucknow:

For distinguished gallantry on the 4th of July, 1857, in going out with two other men, since dead, and spiking two of the Enemy's guns. He killed a Soubadar of the Enemy by one of the guns. Also, for distinguished gallantry on the 9th of the same month, in going out again with three men, since dead, to spike one of the Enemy's guns. He had to retire, the spike being too small, but was exposed to the same danger. Also, for distinguished bravery, on the 27th of September, 1857, in spiking an 18-pounder gun during a Sortie, he being at the same time under a most heavy fire from the Enemy.

He was later promoted to sergeant and died in Liverpool, 17 February 1887.

== The Medal ==
His Victoria Cross is displayed at the Duke of Cornwall's Light Infantry Museum in Bodmin, Cornwall.
