= George Bell (British Army officer) =

British Army officer (1794–1877)

General Sir George Bell KCB
- Born: 17 March 1794; Belle Vue, Lough Erne, Fermanagh
- Died: 10 July 1877 (aged 83); 156 Westbourne Terrace, London
- Burial place: Kensal Green Cemetery
- Relatives: Henry Nugent Bell (Brother)
- Military career
- Allegiance: United Kingdom of Great Britain and Ireland
- Branch: British Army
- Rank: General
- Units: 34th Regiment of Foot; 45th Regiment of Foot; 1st Foot; 104th Foot; 32nd Foot
- Conflicts: Napoleonic Wars; Peninsular War; Battle of Arroyo dos Molinos; Siege of Badajoz; First Anglo-Burmese War; Rebellions of 1837; Crimean War; Battle of Alma; Battle of Inkerman; Siege of Sevastopol
- Awards: Knight Commander of the Bath; Mentioned in dispatches

Sir George Bell KCB (17 March 1794 – 10 July 1877) was an officer in the British Army. He served during the Peninsular War in the Napoleonic Wars, the First Anglo-Burmese War, the Rebellions of 1837 in Canada, and the Crimean War. During the Crimean War he saw action at the battles of Alma and Inkerman, and at the Siege of Sevastopol.

== Early life and the Peninsula War ==
Bell was the son of George Bell, of Belle Vue, on Lough Erne, Fermanagh, by Catherine, daughter of Dominick Nugent, M.P., was born at Belle Vue, 17 March 1794, and whilst yet at school in Dublin was gazetted an ensign in the 34th Regiment of Foot on 11 March 1811.

Bell went to Portugal with his regiment to fight under the Duke of Wellington in the Peninsula War. He carried the colours of his regiment for the first time in the action of Arroyo-de-Molinos; was present at the second and final Siege of Badajoz, and in the majority of the celebrated actions which intervened between that time and the Battle of Toulouse. On being gazetted to the 45th Regiment of Foot in 1825 he proceeded to India, and was present in Ava during the First Anglo-Burmese War.

== Canada ==
Bell was promoted to captain in 1828, and in 1836 was in Canada, where he was actively employed during the rebellion of 1837-1838. He commanded the fort and garrison of Coteau-du-Lac, an important position on the Saint Lawrence River, and received the thanks of the commander of the forces and his brevet-majority, 29 March 1839, for his exertions in recovering the guns of the fort, which had been sunk in the river, unspiking and mounting them in position, when it had been reported to be impossible to do so. The guns were 24-pounders, sixteen of which, with 4,000 round shot, he recovered from the deep in the middle of a Canadian winter.

== Crimea ==
On becoming lieutenant-colonel of the 1st Foot, known as the Royal Regiment, 5 December 1843, Bell next served in Gibraltar, Nova Scotia, the West Indies, the Mediterranean, and Turkey, after which he landed with the allied armies during the Crimea War, and was present at the battles of Alma and Inkerman, and in the Siege of Sevastopol, where he was wounded and honourably mentioned in a despatch from Lord Raglan, who appointed him to the command of a brigade.

== Later life ==
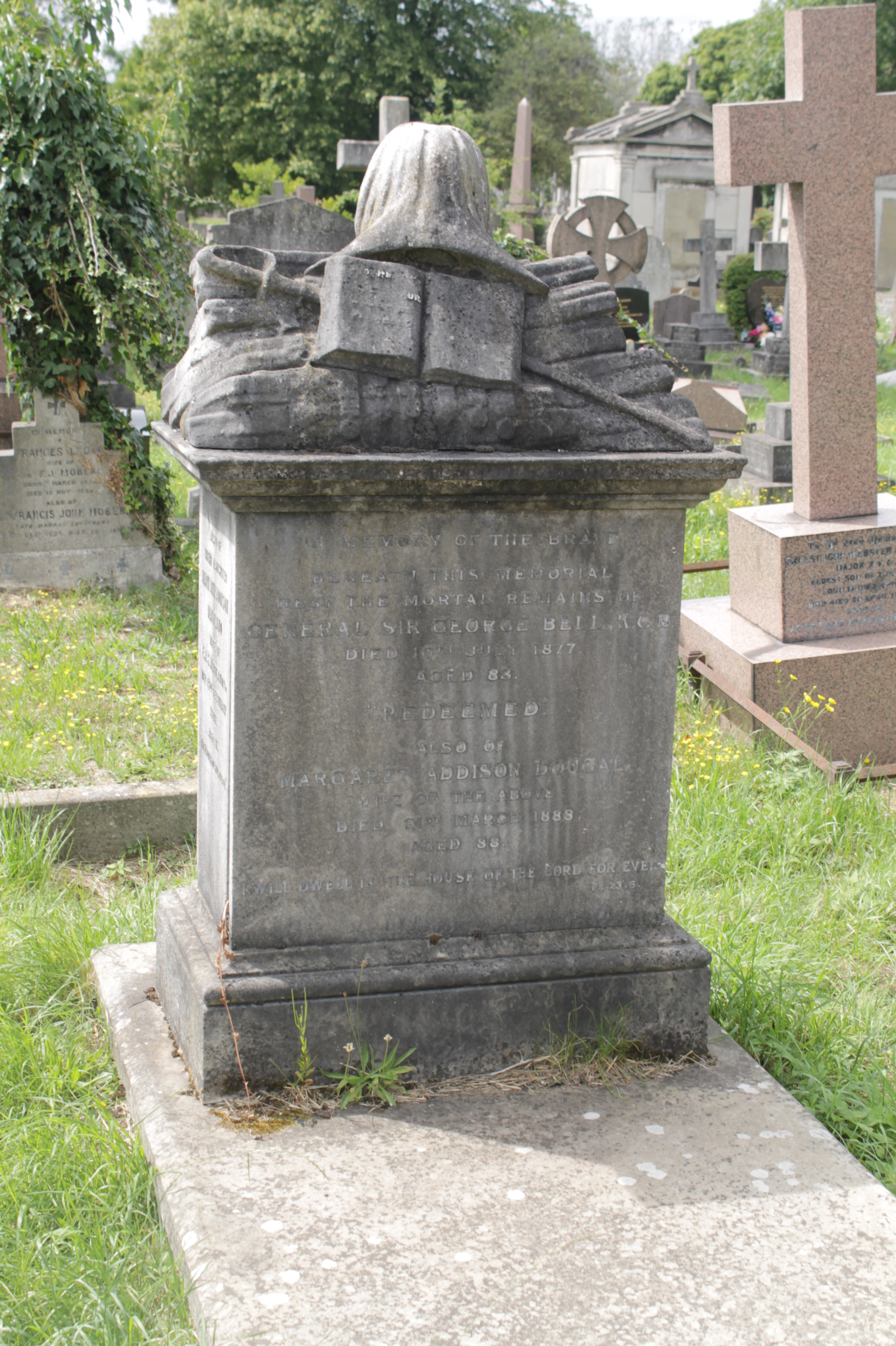
The grave of General Sir George Bell, Kensal Green Cemetery

On his return to England Bell was made a Companion of the Bath on 5 July 1855, and took up his residence at Liverpool as inspecting field officer until 1859, when he became a major-general in the army. He was in the Royal Regiment for the long period of thirty years. From this time onwards he never obtained any further employment, the reason being, as he fully believed, a letter which he wrote to The Times on 12 December 1854, complaining of the deficiencies of the commissariat in the siege of Sevastopol, and soliciting help from the people of England. On 23 October 1863 he was appointed colonel of the 104th Foot; he became colonel of the 32nd Foot on 2 February 1867, and colonel of the 1st Foot on 3 August 1868.

Bell was created a Knight Commander of the Bath on 13 March 1867; a lieutenant-general on 28 January 1868; and a general on 8 March 1873. He died at 156 Westbourne Terrace, London on 10 July 1877 and is buried at Kensal Green Cemetery in London. The grave lies on the main east west path to the west of the central building structure.

== Works ==
Bell's work, in two volumes, entitled Rough Notes by an Old Soldier: During Fifty Years' Service, From Ensign G. B. To Major-General C. B., a gossiping and amusing account of his life and services, was published early in 1867.

== Family ==
Bell had been twice married, the first time to Alicia, daughter and heiress of James Scott, of Ecclesjohn and Commiston, N.B., and secondly, in 1820, to Margaret Addison Dougal (1800-1888), a daughter of Thomas Dougal, of Scotland, banker. His brother was Henry Nugent Bell.

== Notes ==
Military offices
Preceded by Sir Patrick Grant	Colonel of the 104th Regiment of Foot (Bengal Fusiliers); 1863–1867	Succeeded by George Dixon
Preceded by William George Gold	Colonel of the 32nd (Cornwall) Regiment of Foot; 1867–1868	Succeeded by Lord Frederick Paulet
Preceded by Sir Edward Blakeney	Colonel of the 1st, or The Royal Scots Regiment; 1868–1877	Succeeded by Henry Phipps Raymond
