= Henry Nugent Bell =

- Born: 1792; Ireland
- Died: 1822 (aged 29–30)
- Occupation: genealogist

Henry Nugent Bell (1792–1822) was an Irish genealogist.

== Biography ==
He was the eldest son of George Bell, Esq., of Belleview, County Fermanagh (Inner Temple Admission Register).

He followed the profession of a legal antiquary, and, in order to obtain a recognised status, entered himself at the Inner Temple, 17 Nov. 1818. In the same year he acquired considerable distinction by his successful advocacy of the claim of Mr. Hastings to the long-dormant earldom of Huntingdon; the estates, however, with the exception, it is said, of a mill in Yorkshire, had died from the title, and were legally invested in the Earl of Moira's family.

Bell published a detailed account of the proceedings in The Huntingdon Peerage, 4to, London, 1820, pp. 413, and the narrative of his various adventures, which are given at length, displays a suspicious luxuriance of imagination not altogether in keeping with what professed to be a grave genealogical treatise. To the unsold copies a new title- page was affixed in 1821, with a genealogical table and additional portraits. Bell was also employed by Mr. J. L. Crawford to further his claim to the titles and estates of Crawford and Lindsay, and, if we may credit the common report, received no less a sum than 5,036/. for prosecuting the suit. He was cut off" before he could bring the matter to a decisive issue, and dying in- solvent, the unfortunate claimant's money was in a great measure lost.

According to Lady Anne Hamilton, Bell, with other minions, was delegated by Lord Sidmouth in 1819 to incite the starving people of Manchester against the ministry, and by their means the meeting of 16 Aug. was convoked which led to the Peterloo massacre. The circumstances attending his death as narrated in the journals of the day were somewhat tragic. An action to recover a sum of money advanced to him by an engraver named Cooke was tried on 18 Oct. 1822, and a verdict passed against him; on the same evening he died. His younger brother was Sir George Bell, K.C.B.
