= Thomas Cadell (VC) =

Scottish Victoria Cross recipient (1835–1919)

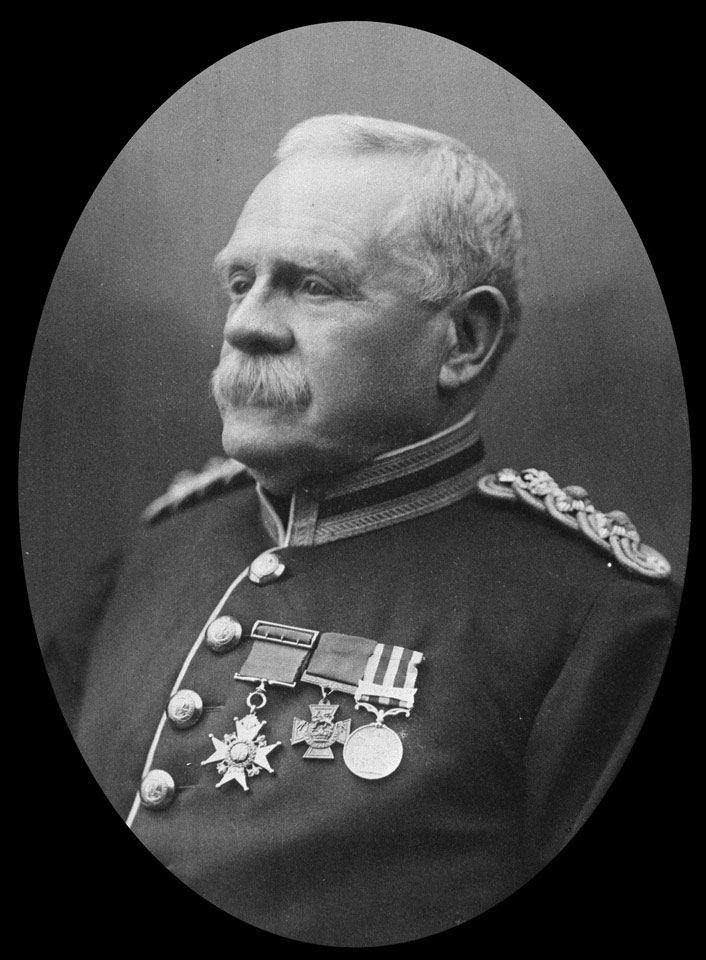
- Born: 5 September 1835; Cockenzie, East Lothian
- Died: 6 April 1919 (aged 83)
- Burial place: Tranent Churchyard
- Military career
- Allegiance: United Kingdom
- Branch: Bengal Army; British Indian Army
- Service years: 1854 - 1892
- Rank: Colonel
- Units: 2nd European Bengal Fusiliers; Indian Staff Corps
- Conflicts: Indian Mutiny
- Awards: Victoria Cross; Companion of the Order of the Bath
- Other work: Governor of the Andaman and Nicobar Islands

Colonel Thomas Cadell VC CB (5 September 1835 – 6 April 1919) was an army officer who served in India. He served during the 1857 rebellion and was a Scottish recipient of the Victoria Cross. He later served as a governor and chief commissioner in the Andaman Islands.

== Biography ==
Cadell was born in East Lothian at Cockenzie House to Hew Francis and Janet née Sydserff. An older brother, Robert Cadell (1825-1907), joined the Royal Artillery and another Francis gained fame as an explorer. Samuel Hill Lawrence was a cousin. Thomas studied at the Edinburgh Academy and received army commission in 1854 and was posted to the 2nd European Bengal Fusiliers (later The Royal Munster Fusiliers) just before the 1857 uprising.

Cadell was 21 years old and a lieutenant during the Indian Mutiny when he performed the deeds on 12 June 1857 at Delhi, India which resulted in being awarded the Victoria Cross:

For having, on the 12th of June, 1857, at the Flag-staff Picquet at Delhi, when the whole of the Picquet of Her Majesty's 75th Regiment and 2nd European Bengal Fusiliers were driven in by a large body of the enemy, brought in from amongst the enemy a wounded Bugler of his own regiment, under a most severe fire, who would otherwise have been cut up by the rebels. Also, on the same day, when the Fusiliers were retiring, by order, on Metcalfe's house, on its being reported that there was a wounded man left behind, Lieutenant Cadell went back of his own accord towards the enemy, accompanied by three men, and brought in a man of the 75th Regiment, who was severely wounded, under a most heavy fire from the advancing enemy.

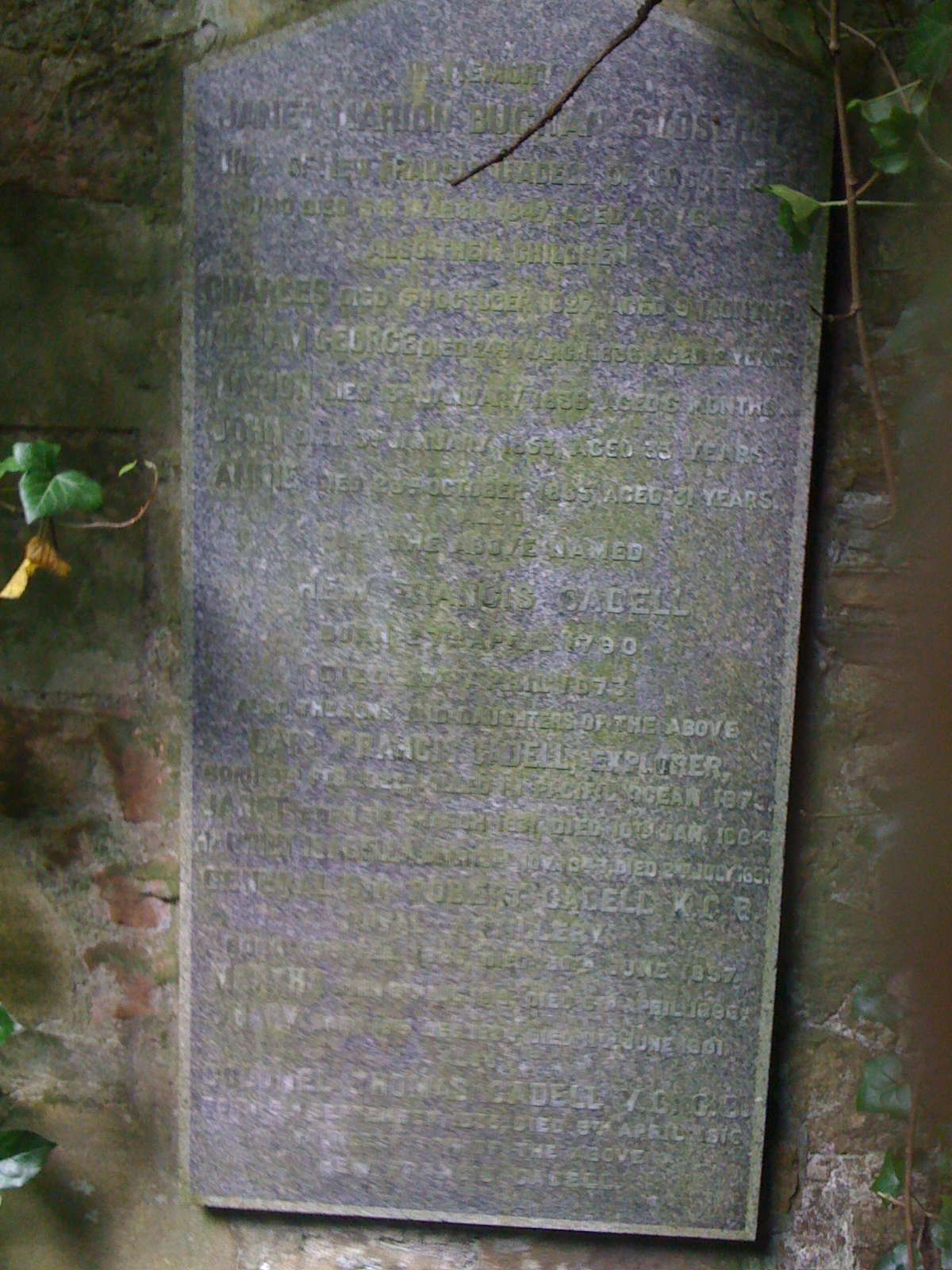
Memorial tablet in the Cadell family vault at Tranent Churchyard

Cadell became a captain in 1866 and was promoted to major in 1874. He was transferred to the Political Department and served in Central India and Rajputana. He later achieved the rank of colonel in the service of the Indian Staff Corps and held various political appointments in India. From 1879 to 1892, he was the chief commissioner of the Andaman and Nicobar Islands. In 1907 he was created Companion of the Bath.

Cadell died in Edinburgh, Scotland and is buried in the family vault in Tranent Parish Churchyard.

== Family ==
He was married to Anna Catherine (d.1876), daughter of Patrick Dalmahoy WS (1798–1872) and Catherine Sawers. They had two sons and two daughters, one son Patrick Robert, became a chief secretary in the Bombay Presidency. The other son, Hew Francis joined the Lothians and Border Horse.

== Legacy ==
Cadell Bay in the South Andamans was named after him but the name is no longer in use. Cadell Road in Bombay (now Mumbai), was named not after him but his son, (later Sir) Patrick Robert Cadell. After the Indian Independence in 1947, it was renamed after Indian freedom fighter Vinayak Damodar Savarkar, who was lodged at the Cellular Jail in the Andaman and Nicobar Islands.

Government offices
Preceded by Charles Arthur Barwell	Chief Commissioner of the Andaman and Nicobar Islands; 1878–1892	Succeeded by Norman Horsford
