= Elizabeth A. Harris =

American journalist

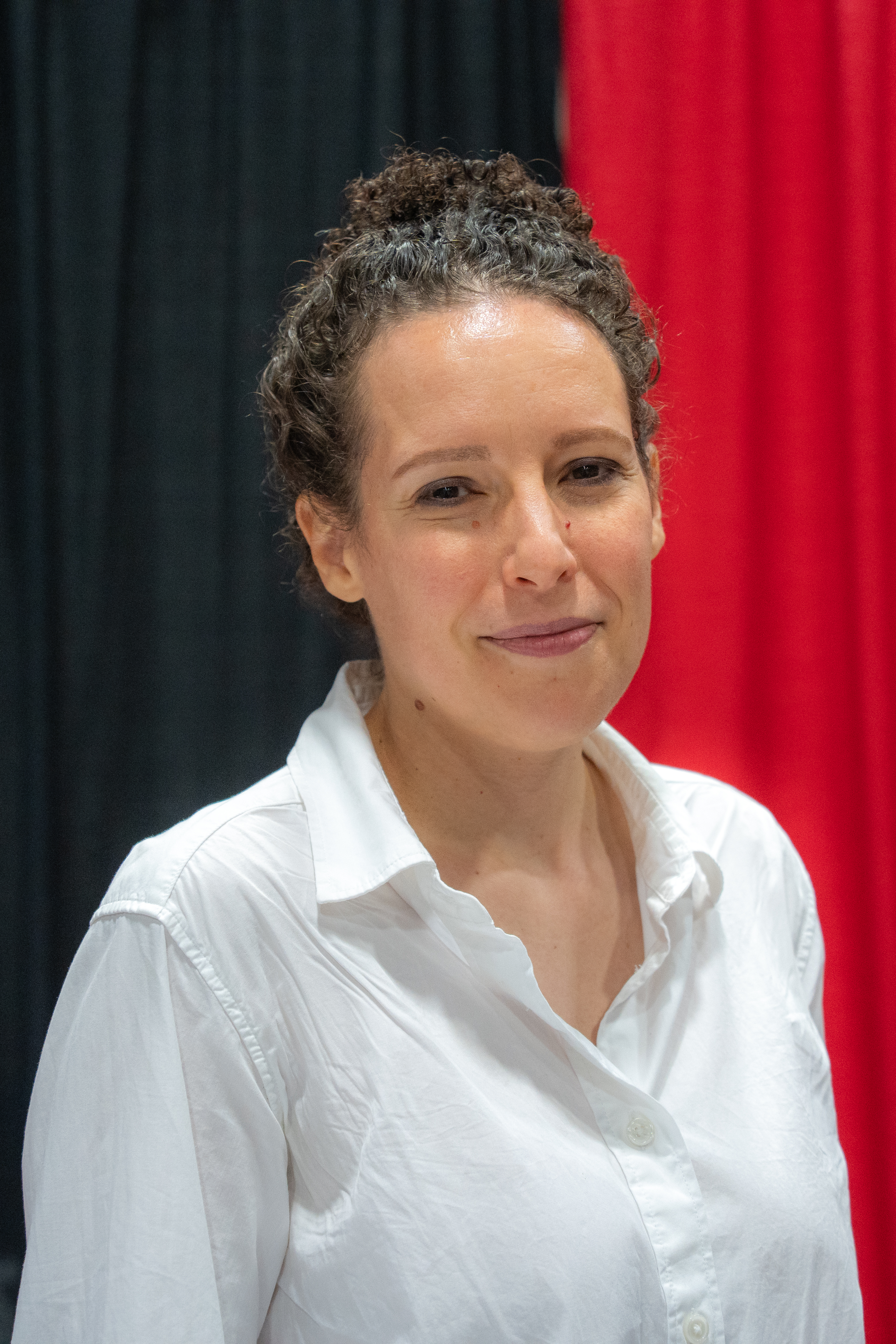
- Harris at the 2025 National Book Festival
- Education: Oberlin College (BA)
- Occupations: Journalist, novelist
- Employer: The New York Times
- Known for: Reporting for The New York Times
- Notable work: How to Sleep at Night, Wife & Wife

Elizabeth Allen Harris is an American journalist and reporter for The New York Times. She is the author of the novels How to Sleep at Night and Wife & Wife.

== Early life ==
Harris grew up in New York City, and attended Oberlin College.

== Career ==
=== Journalism ===
After graduating from college, Harris joined The New York Times. Her reporting beats have included Metro, Business, Culture, Education, and Real Estate.

==== Books Desk: 2020–2026 ====
In 2020, Harris was brought in to the Books Desk at The New York Times, where she was named a publishing reporter. During Harris's time working at the Books Desk, she has reported for The New York Times numerous times about the cases of Book banning in the United States (2021–present). Harris has reported on the rise of this situation in public libraries and school libraries in the article, "Book Bans are Rising Sharply in Public Libraries" This article written alongside Alexandra Alter, was referenced in multiple scholarly research journals, including articles published within ResearchGate's online journal in February 2025 and Taylor & Francis's 32nd Volume in June 2024. The article was also referenced by the civil rights group, PEN America in April 2024, and it was also referenced in September 2025 by the University of Colorado Law School's Law review.

=== Writing (Fiction) ===
==== Debut novel: How to Sleep at Night ====
In 2025, her debut novel, How to Sleep at Night, was published by HarperCollins.

===== Publication =====
How to Sleep at Night was published on January 7, 2025, by William Morrow and Company. William Morrow and Company is an imprint of HarperCollins Publishing that works with both fiction and nonfiction publishers. How to Sleep at Night is published under the following genres: Novels, Political Fiction, Queer Fiction.

===== Reception =====
After Harris released How to Sleep at Night, it received national attention from major newspapers and book reviewers such as The New York Times, The Washington Post, Chicago Review of Books, and Kirkus Reviews.

== Awards and honors ==
=== Journalistic awards and honors ===
Harris has received journalistic awards from the New York Press Club, The Silurians Press Club, and the Association of LGBTQ+ Journalists. Harris was a member of a team that won a medallion and award from The Silurians Press Club in 2024 for her reporting work at The New York Times. Harris also won the 2023 NLGJA Awards from the NLGJA: The Association of LGBTQ+ Journalists. Harris won the "Excellence in Newswriting Award" from the NLGJA for her reporting on Book banning in the United States (2021–present); including her works with The New York Times: "Book Banning in the United States: Targeting LGBTQ Themes and Communities" and "With Rising Book Bans, Librarians Have Come Under Attack". Harris worked on one of three projects at The New York Times that received an NLGJA Award in 2023.

=== Literary awards and honors ===
Harris was selected as a Featured Author for the 2025 National Book Festival. Harris's debut novel, How to Sleep at Night received a positive review from Kirkus Reviews. Her novel, How to Sleep at Night, also was selected as The Sunday Times Hottest Read of 2025 and Most Anticipated Book of 2025 by Time (magazine).
