= Thomas Adair Butler =

Recipient of the Victoria Cross

Major Thomas Butler VC
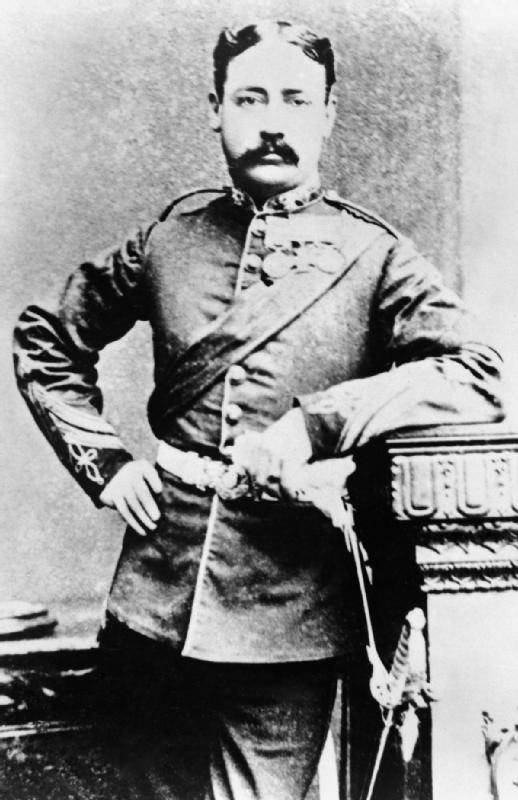
- Major Butler's portrait
- Born: 12 February 1836; Soberton, Hampshire
- Died: 17 May 1901 (aged 65)
- Burial place: St Michael's Churchyard, Camberley
- Military career
- Allegiance: United Kingdom
- Branch: Bengal Army; British Army
- Service years: 1854–1874
- Rank: Major
- Units: 1st European Bengal Fusiliers; 101st Regiment of Foot
- Conflicts: Indian Mutiny; Umbeyla Campaign
- Awards: Victoria Cross

Thomas Adair Butler VC (12 February 1836 – 17 May 1901) was an English recipient of the Victoria Cross, the highest and most prestigious award for gallantry in the face of the enemy that can be awarded to British and Commonwealth forces.

== Early life ==
Thomas Adair Butler was born at Soberton, Hampshire. He was the son of the Rev. Stephen Butler, of Bury Lodge, Hambledon, Hampshire, by his first wife Mary Ann Thistlethwayte, daughter of Thomas Thistlethwayte (1779–1850), of Southwick Park; Deputy Lieutenant of Hampshire, hereditary Constable of Porchester Castle and warden of the Forest of Bere. He was a nephew of Rear-Admiral Sir Francis Augustus Collier.

He was educated privately and gazetted as Ensign to the 1st Bengal European Fusiliers, 9 June 1854; Lieutenant, 23 November 1856, and was afterwards Instructor of Musketry. He served in the Indian Mutiny from 10 June 1857, was in all the engagements under the walls of Delhi, was galloper to General Nicholson at the action of Nugafshot, and took part in the Storming of Delhi. He also took part in the actions of Gungehri, Pu and Minpoorie and was present at the Siege and capture of Lucknow where he won the Victoria Cross.

== Details ==
He was 22 years old, and a lieutenant in the 1st European Bengal Fusiliers (later Royal Munster Fusiliers) during the Indian Mutiny when the following deed took place on 9 March 1858 at Lucknow, India, for which he was awarded the VC:

Of which success the skirmishers on the other side of the river were subsequently apprised by Lieutenant Butler, of the Bengal Fusiliers, who swam across the Goomtee, and, climbing the parapet, remained in that position for a considerable time, under a heavy fire of musketry, until the work was occupied.

— Extract of Lieutenant-General Sir James Outram's memorandum of operations carried on under his command at the siege of Lucknow, published in the Governor-General's Gazette Extraordinary, of the 5th April, 1858, and re-published in General Orders by the Commander-in-Chief in India, on the 27th of December, 1858.

== Further information ==
He later served in the Umbeyla Campaign and achieved the rank of major in the service of the 101st Regiment of Foot.

== The medal ==
His Victoria Cross is displayed at the Royal Military Academy, Sandhurst.
