= 104th Regiment of Foot (Bengal Fusiliers) =

- Active: 1765–1803; 1822–1830; 1839–1881
- Country: East India Company (1765–1858); United Kingdom (1858–1881)
- Branch: Bengal Army (1765–1862); British Army (1862–1881)
- Type: Infantry
- Size: One battalion
- Garrison/HQ: Ballymullen Barracks, Tralee
- Engagements: First Rohilla War; Second Anglo-Sikh War; Second Anglo-Burmese War; Indian Rebellion

The 104th Regiment of Foot (Bengal Fusiliers) was a regiment of the British Army, raised by the Honourable East India Company in 1765. Under the Childers Reforms it amalgamated with the 101st Regiment of Foot (Royal Bengal Fusiliers) to form the Royal Munster Fusiliers.

== History ==
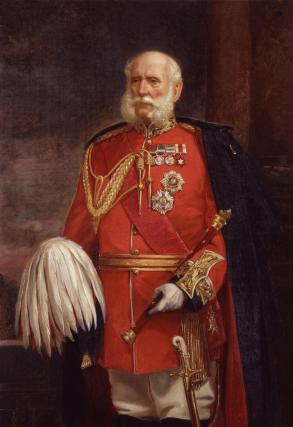
Field Marshal Sir Patrick Grant, colonel of the regiment in the 1860s

=== Early history ===
The regiment as first raised by the Honourable East India Company as the 2nd Bengal European Regiment when it was formed from the 1st Bengal European Regiment in 1765. It went to take part in an action at Rohilkhand in April 1774 during the First Rohilla War before being absorbed by the Marine Battalion in 1803. It was re-raised as the 2nd Bengal (European) Regiment in 1822 and took part in a deployment to Burma in 1825 before being disbanded in 1830.

=== The Victorian era ===
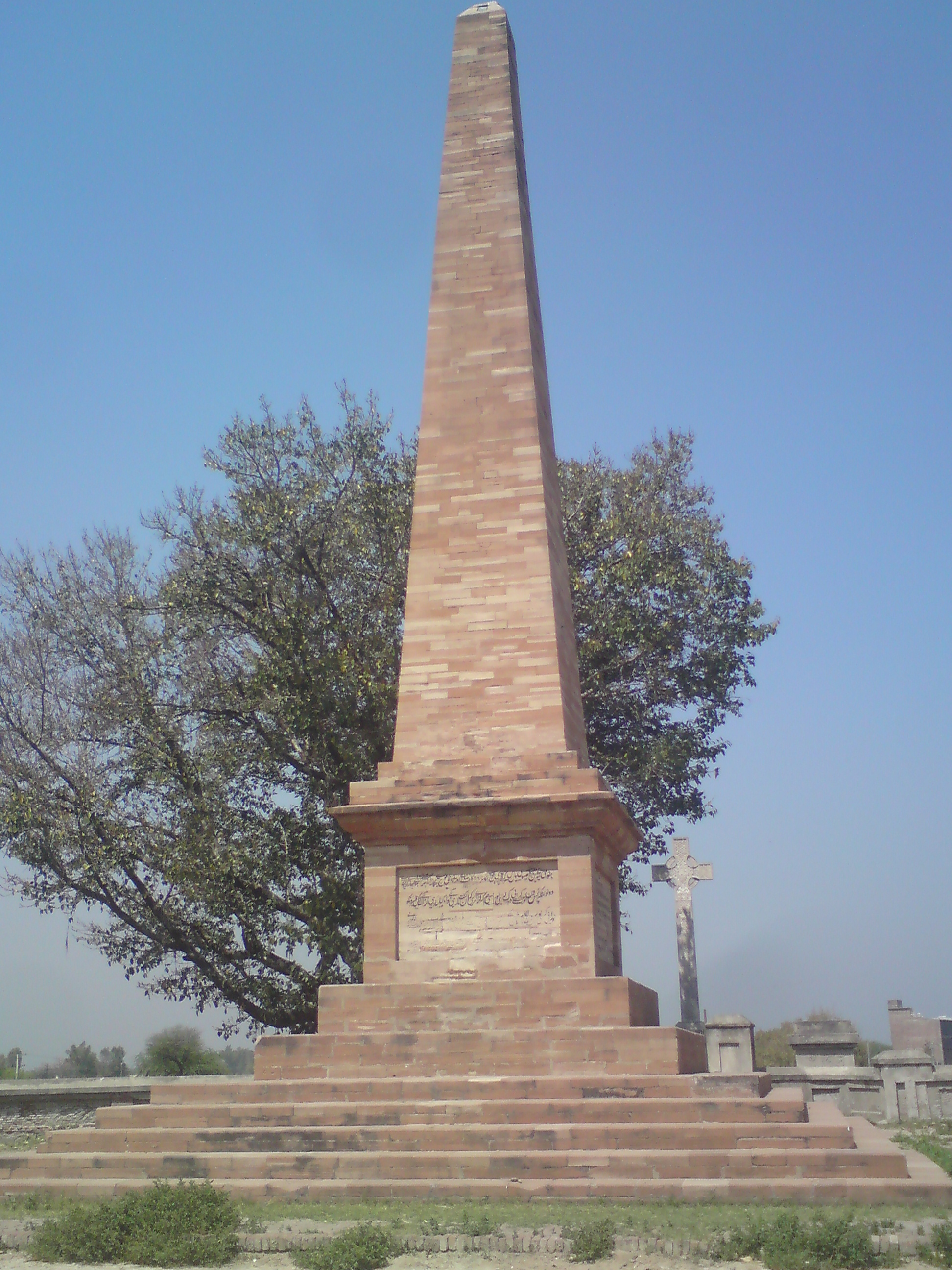
The monument erected in memory of the losses sustained by both armies at the Battles of Saddalupar and Chillianwala in January 1849

The regiment was re-raised as the 2nd Bengal (European) Light Infantry from a nucleus of 1st Bengal (European) Regiment in 1839. It saw action at the Battle of Chillianwala in January 1849 and the Battle of Gujrat in February 1849 in the Punjab during the Second Anglo-Sikh War. The regiment became the 2nd Bengal (European) Fusiliers in 1850 was deployed to Burma again in 1853 during the Second Anglo-Burmese War and then served at the Siege of Delhi in autumn 1857 during the Indian Rebellion. After the Crown took control of the Presidency armies in the aftermath of the Indian Rebellion, the regiment became the 2nd Bengal Fusiliers in November 1859 and then the 2nd Royal Bengal Fusiliers in May 1861. It was then renumbered as the 104th Regiment of Foot (Bengal Fusiliers) on transfer to the British Army in September 1862. Although a new commanding officer was appointed on transfer to the British Army, both majors and six of the twelve captains had prior service in the regiment.

During the cholera epidemic of 1869, the regiment left its barracks at Peshawar on the North West Frontier for the countryside, to try to alleviate the impact of the disease. After the regiment had returned to barracks with the end of the epidemic, the commanding officer's wife, Elizabeth Webber Harris, was presented with a gold replica Victoria Cross, by the officers of the regiment, for her tireless endeavours tending the sick men. The presentation had the approval of Queen Victoria and was made by General Sir Sam Browne, commander of the Peshawar garrison. The regiment embarked for England in 1871.

As part of the Cardwell Reforms of the 1870s, where single-battalion regiments were linked together to share a single depot and recruiting district in the United Kingdom, the 104th was linked with the 101st Regiment of Foot (Royal Bengal Fusiliers), and assigned to district no. 70 at Ballymullen Barracks in Tralee. On 1 July 1881 the Childers Reforms came into effect and the regiment amalgamated with the 101st Regiment of Foot (Royal Bengal Fusiliers) to form the Royal Munster Fusiliers.

== Battle honours ==
Battle honours won by the regiment were:

- Rohilla War: Rohilcund 1774 (inherited from predecessor regiment)
- Second Anglo-Sikh War: Chillianwallah, Goojerat, Punjaub
- Indian Mutiny: Delhi 1857

== Regimental Colonels ==
Colonels of the Regiment were:

2nd Bengal Fusiliers (HEIC)

- c.1859: Maj-Gen. Robert Blackall

104th Regiment of Foot (Bengal Fusiliers) (British Army)

- 1862–1863: F.M. Sir Patrick Grant, GCB, GCMG
- 1863–1867: Gen. Sir George Bell, KCB
- 1867–1874: Gen. George Dixon
- 1874–1881: F.M. Sir Frederick Paul Haines, GCB, GCSI, CIE
