= Elizabeth Webber Harris =

Recipient of an honorary Victoria Cross

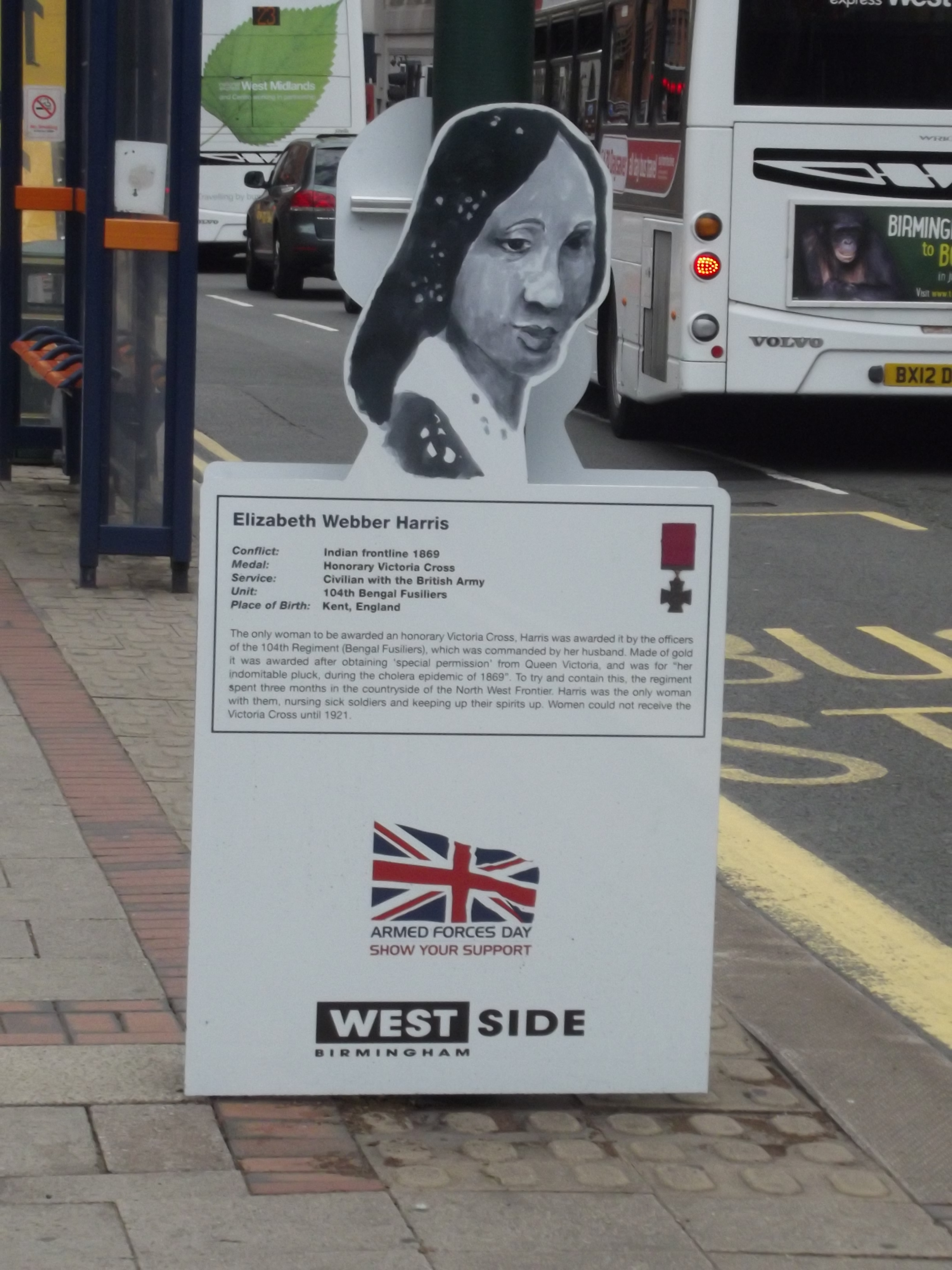
- Born: Elizabeth Matthews; 1834; Kent, England
- Died: 1917 (aged 82–83); London, England
- Occupation: Nurse
- Known for: Awarded a replica Victoria Cross (with permission of Queen Victoria)

Elizabeth Webber Harris (1834–1917) was an English nurse who was awarded a replica Victoria Cross (VC) in 1869, with the permission of Queen Victoria, for her bravery during a cholera outbreak in India. She remains the only woman to be awarded a VC of any description.

== Early life ==
Harris was born Elizabeth Matthews in Kent, England in 1834. She was the second child of James Matthews and Mary Ann Bailey. On 22 February 1859 she married Webber Desborough Harris (born 1823) then a captain in the 2nd Bengal Fusiliers (later renamed the 104th).

== India and the Victoria Cross ==
The details of Harris' time in India is highly reliant on her own account. In 1869 Harris was the only woman with her husband's regiment, near Peshawar (modern Pakistan), during a cholera outbreak. (Note: In 1869 Webber Desborough Harris, now a colonel, was the commanding officer of the 104th Bengal Fusiliers.) (Note: A London Times article refers to her being the last surviving female nurse. This is not mentioned elsewhere.) The regiment was split in two in order to control the infection. Three months later about one-third of the soldiers in Harris's half of the regiment had died of cholera. Harris describes nursing the sick, a confrontation with local tribesmen, and the organisation of extensive morale-boosting activities.

At the time, a Victoria Cross could be awarded for bravery behind the lines. However, women were not eligible. The officers of the regiment awarded her a gold replica of the VC with the permission of the Queen; its inscription read:

Presented to Mrs Webber Harris by the officers of the 104th Bengal Fusiliers, for her indomitable pluck, during the cholera epidemic of 1869.

The award was presented by General Sir Sam Browne, then the commander of the Peshawar garrison.

For many years Harris's cross was displayed at the Royal United Services Institute in Whitehall, London. In 2013 it was acquired by Michael Ashcroft and has been shown at the Imperial War Museum.

== Later life ==
Harris died in 1917 in London and her ashes were interred at St Mark, Ampfield, Hampshire.

In 1920 a Royal Warrant allowed for women serving in the Armed Forces to be formally awarded the VC. However to date no woman has received the VC.
