= List of Victoria Cross recipients by campaign =

The Victoria Cross (VC) is a military decoration awarded for valour "in the face of the enemy" to members of armed forces of some Commonwealth countries and previous British Empire territories. It takes precedence over all other orders, decorations and medals, and may be awarded to a person of any rank in any service and to civilians under military command. The award was officially constituted when Queen Victoria issued a warrant under the Royal sign-manual on 29 January 1856 that was gazetted on 5 February 1856. The order was backdated to 1854 to recognise acts of valour during the Crimean War. The first awards ceremony was held on 26 June 1857, where Queen Victoria invested 62 of the 111 Crimean recipients in a ceremony in Hyde Park.

The first citations of the VC, particularly those in the initial gazette of 24 February 1857, varied in the details of each action; some specify date ranges while some specify a single date. The original Royal Warrant did not contain a specific clause regarding posthumous awards, although official policy was to not award the VC posthumously. Between 1897 and 1901, several notices were issued in the London Gazette regarding soldiers who would have been awarded the VC had they survived. In a partial reversal of policy in 1902, six of the soldiers mentioned were granted the VC, but not "officially" awarded the medal. In 1907, the posthumous policy was completely reversed and medals were sent to the next of kin of the six soldiers. The Victoria Cross warrant was not officially amended to explicitly allow posthumous awards until 1920, but one quarter of all awards for the First World War were posthumous. Three people have been awarded the VC and Bar, which is a medal for two actions; Noel Chavasse, Arthur Martin-Leake and Charles Upham. Chavasse received both medals for actions in the First World War, while Martin-Leake was awarded his first VC for actions in the Second Boer War, and his second for actions during the First World War. Charles Upham received both VCs for actions during the Second World War.

The Victoria Cross has been awarded 1,358 times to 1,355 individual recipients. The largest number of recipients for one campaign is the First World War, for which 628 medals were awarded to 627 recipients. The largest number awarded for actions on a single day was 24 on 16 November 1857, at the Second Relief of Lucknow, during the Indian Mutiny. The largest number awarded for a single action was 18, for the assault on Sikandar Bagh, during the Second Relief of Lucknow. The largest number awarded to one unit during a single action was 7, to the 2nd/24th Foot, for the defence of Rorke's Drift (22–23 January 1879), during the Zulu War.

Since 1991, Australia, Canada and New Zealand have created their own separate Victoria Crosses: the Victoria Cross for Australia, the Victoria Cross (Canada), and the Victoria Cross for New Zealand. Only five of these separate medals have been awarded, all for actions in the War in Afghanistan; Willie Apiata received the Victoria Cross for New Zealand on 26 July 2007; on 16 January 2009 Mark Donaldson, on 24 August 2010 Daniel Keighran, on 23 January 2011 Ben Roberts-Smith, and on 13 February 2014 Cameron Baird (posthumous award), were awarded the Victoria Cross for Australia. As these are separate medals, they are not included in this list.

- This along with a ‡ indicates that the row is a link to a separate page containing the recipients of wars or campaigns with a large number of recipients.
- This along with a * indicates that the Victoria Cross was awarded posthumously.

Recipients	Unit	Campaign	Dates	Location
111 Crimean War recipients‡	—	Crimean War	1854–1856	—
John Wood	20th Bombay Native Infantry	Anglo-Persian War	9 August 1856	Bushire, Persia
John Malcolmson	3rd Bombay Light Cavalry	Anglo-Persian War	8 February 1857	Khoosh-ab, Persia
Arthur Moore	3rd Bombay Light Cavalry	Anglo-Persian War	8 February 1857	Khoosh-ab, Persia
182 Indian Mutiny recipients‡	—	Indian Mutiny	1857–1859	—
Nathaniel Burslem	67th Regiment of Foot	Third China War	21 August 1860	Taku Forts, China
John Chaplin	67th Regiment of Foot	Third China War	21 August 1860	Taku Forts, China
Andrew Fitzgibbon	67th Regiment of Foot	Third China War	21 August 1860	Taku Forts, China
Thomas Lane	67th Regiment of Foot	Third China War	21 August 1860	Taku Forts, China
Edmund Lenon	67th Regiment of Foot	Third China War	21 August 1860	Taku Forts, China
John McDougall	44th Regiment of Foot	Third China War	21 August 1860	Taku Forts, China
Robert Rogers	44th Regiment of Foot	Third China War	21 August 1860	Taku Forts, China
15 New Zealand Wars recipients‡	—	New Zealand Wars	1860–1865	—
George Hinckley	Naval Brigade	Taiping Rebellion	9 October 1862	Fenghua, China
George Fosbery	4th Bengal European Regiment	Umbeyla Campaign	30 October 1863	Crag Picquet, India
Henry Pitcher	4th Punjab Infantry	Umbeyla Campaign	30 October 1863	Crag Picquet, India
Duncan Boyes	HMS Euryalus	Bombardment of Shimonoseki	6 September 1864	Kanmon Straits, Japan
Thomas Pride	HMS Euryalus	Bombardment of Shimonoseki	6 September 1864	Kanmon Straits, Japan
William Seeley	HMS Euryalus	Bombardment of Shimonoseki	6 September 1864	Kanmon Straits, Japan
James Dundas	Bengal Engineers	Bhutan War	30 April 1865	Dewan-Giri, India
William Trevor	Bengal Engineers	Bhutan War	30 April 1865	Dewan-Giri, India
Timothy O'Hea	Rifle Brigade	—^{[A]}	9 June 1866	Danville, Quebec
Samuel Hodge	West India Regiment	The Gambia	30 June 1866	Tubabecelong, Gambia
David Bell	24th Regiment of Foot	Andaman Islands Expedition	7 May 1867	Little Andaman
Campbell Douglas	24th Regiment of Foot	Andaman Islands Expedition	7 May 1867	Little Andaman
James Cooper	24th Regiment of Foot	Andaman Islands Expedition	7 May 1867	Little Andaman
Thomas Murphy	24th Regiment of Foot	Andaman Islands Expedition	7 May 1867	Little Andaman
William Griffiths	24th Regiment of Foot	Andaman Islands Expedition	7 May 1867	Little Andaman
James Bergin	33rd Regiment of Foot	Abyssinian War	13 April 1868	Battle of Magdala, Abyssinia
Michael Magner	33rd Regiment of Foot	Abyssinian War	13 April 1868	Battle of Magdala, Abyssinia
Donald Macintyre	2nd Gurkha Rifles	Looshai Expedition	4 January 1872	Lalgnoora, India
Edric Gifford	24th Regiment of Foot	First Ashanti Expedition	1873–1874	Becquah, Ashanti
Reginald Sartorius	6th Bengal Cavalry	First Ashanti Expedition	17 January 1874	Abogu, Ashanti
Samuel McGaw	42nd Regiment of Foot	First Ashanti Expedition	21 January 1874	Amoaful, Ashanti
Mark Bell	Corps of Royal Engineers	First Ashanti Expedition	4 February 1874	Ordashu, Ashanti
George Channer	Bengal Staff Corps	Perak War	20 December 1875	Malaya, Malaysia
Andrew Scott	Bengal Staff Corps	Baluchistan	26 July 1877	Quetta, India
Hans Moore	88th Regiment of Foot	9th Cape Frontier War	29 December 1877	King William's Town, Cape Colony
23 Zulu War recipients‡	—	Zulu War	1879	—
16 Second Afghan War recipients‡	—	Second Afghan War	1878–1880	—
Peter Brown	Cape Mounted Riflemen	Basuto War	8 April 1879	Morosi's Mountain, South Africa
Robert Scott	Cape Mounted Riflemen	Basuto War	8 April 1879	Morosi's Mountain, South Africa
Edmund Hartley	Cape Mounted Riflemen	Basuto War	5 June 1879	Morosi's Mountain, South Africa
Francis Fitzpatrick	94th Regiment of Foot	Campaign against Sekukuni	28 November 1879	Sekukuni's Town, South Africa
Thomas Flawn	94th Regiment of Foot	Campaign against Sekukuni	28 November 1879	Sekukuni's Town, South Africa
Richard Ridgeway	Bengal Staff Corps	Second Naga Hills Expedition	22 November 1879	Konama, India
John McCrea	1st Cape Mounted Yeomanry	Basuto War	14 January 1881	Tweefontein, South Africa
John Danaher	Nourse's Horse	First Boer War	16 January 1881	Elandsfontein, South Africa
James Murray	94th Regiment of Foot	First Boer War	16 January 1881	Elandsfontein, South Africa
John Doogan	1st King's Dragoon Guards	First Boer War	28 January 1881	Laing's Nek, South Africa
Alan Hill	58th Regiment of Foot	First Boer War	28 January 1881	Laing's Nek, South Africa
James Osborne	58th Regiment of Foot	First Boer War	22 February 1881	Wesselstroom, South Africa
Joseph Farmer	Army Medical Department	First Boer War	27 February 1881	Majubu Hill, South Africa
Israel Harding	HMS Alexandra	Occupation of Egypt	11 July 1882	Alexandria, Egypt
Frederick Corbett	King's Royal Rifle Corps	Occupation of Egypt	5 August 1882	Kafr Dowar, Egypt
William Edwards	Highland Light Infantry	Occupation of Egypt	13 September 1882	Tel-el-Kebir, Egypt
William Marshall	19th Hussars	Sudan Campaign	29 February 1884	El Teb, Sudan
Arthur Wilson	HMS Hecla	Sudan Campaign	29 February 1884	El Teb, Sudan
Thomas Edwards	Black Watch	Sudan Campaign	13 March 1884	Tamai, Sudan
Percival Marling	King's Royal Rifle Corps	Sudan Campaign	13 March 1884	Tamai, Sudan
Alfred Smith	Royal Regiment of Artillery	Sudan Campaign	17 January 1885	Abu Klea, Sudan
Thomas Byrne	21st Lancers	Sudan Campaign	2 September 1898	Omdurman, Sudan
Raymond De Montmorency	21st Lancers	Sudan Campaign	2 September 1898	Omdurman, Sudan
Paul Kenna	21st Lancers	Sudan Campaign	2 September 1898	Omdurman, Sudan
Nevill Smyth	2nd Dragoon Guards	Sudan Campaign	2 September 1898	Omdurman, Sudan
Alexander Hore-Ruthven	Highland Light Infantry	Sudan Campaign	22 September 1898	Gedarif, Sudan
John Crimmin	Bombay Medical Service	British rule in Burma	1 January 1889	Karenni, Burma
Ferdinand Le Quesne	Army Medical Department	British rule in Burma	4 May 1889	Tartan, Burma
Charles Grant	Indian Staff Corps	Manipur Expedition	21 March 1891 to 9 April 1891	Thobal, Burma
Fenton Aylmer	Corps of Royal Engineers	Hunza-Naga Campaign	2 December 1891	Nilt Fort, India
Guy Boisragon	5th Gurkha Rifles	Hunza-Naga Campaign	2 December 1891	Nilt Fort, India
John Smith	5th Gurkha Rifles	Hunza-Naga Campaign	20 December 1891	Nilt Fort, India
William Gordon	West India Regiment	The Gambia	13 March 1892	Toniataba, Gambia
Owen Lloyd	Army Medical Department	Kachin Hills Expedition	6 January 1893	Fort Sima, Burma
Harry Whitchurch	Indian Medical Service	Chitral Expedition	3 March 1895	Chitral Fort, India
Herbert Henderson	Bulawayo Field Force	Matabeleland Rebellion	30 March 1896	Bulawayo, Rhodesia
Frank Baxter	Bulawayo Field Force	Matabeleland Rebellion	22 April 1896*	Umguza, Rhodesia
Randolph Nesbitt	Mashonaland Mounted Police	Mashona Rebellion	19 June 1896	Salisbury, Rhodesia
Edmond Costello	22nd Punjab Infantry	Siege of Malakand	26 July 1897	Malakand, India
James Colvin	Corps of Royal Engineers	Mohmand Campaign	16 September 1897	Bilot, India
James Smith	Corps of Royal Engineers	Mohmand Campaign	16 September 1897	Bilot, India
Thomas Watson	Corps of Royal Engineers	Mohmand Campaign	16 September 1897	Bilot, India
Robert Adams	Corps of Guides	Tirah Campaign	17 August 1897	Swat, India
Hector MacLean	Corps of Guides	Tirah Campaign	17 August 1897*	Swat, India
Alexander Fincastle	16th Lancers	Tirah Campaign	17 August 1897	Swat, India
Henry Pennell	Sherwood Foresters	Tirah Campaign	20 October 1897	Dargai, India
George Findlater	Gordon Highlanders	Tirah Campaign	20 October 1897	Dargai, India
Edward Lawson	Gordon Highlanders	Tirah Campaign	20 October 1897	Dargai, India
Samuel Vickery	Dorset Regiment	Tirah Campaign	20 October 1897	Dargai, India
William Maillard	HMS Hazard	Occupation of Crete	6 September 1898	Crete, Greece
John Mackenzie	Seaforth Highlanders	Third Ashanti Expedition	6 June 1900	Dompoassi, Ashanti
Charles Melliss	Indian Staff Corps	Third Ashanti Expedition	30 September 1900	Obassa, Ashanti
Lewis Halliday	Royal Marine Light Infantry	Boxer Rising	24 June 1900	Peking, China
Basil Guy	Naval Brigade	Boxer Rising	13 July 1900	China
78 Second Boer War recipients‡	—	Second Boer War	1899–1902	—
Alexander Cobbe	King's African Rifles	Second Somaliland Expedition	6 October 1902	Erego, Somaliland
William Walker	4th Gurkha Rifles	Third Somaliland Expedition	22 April 1903	Daratoleh, Somaliland
John Gough	Rifle Brigade	Third Somaliland Expedition	22 April 1903	Daratoleh, Somaliland
George Rolland	1st Bombay Grenadiers	Third Somaliland Expedition	22 April 1903	Daratoleh, Somaliland
Herbert Carter	Duke of Cornwall's Light Infantry	Fourth Somaliland Expedition	19 December 1903	Jidballi, Somaliland
Clement Smith	Duke of Cornwall's Light Infantry	Fourth Somaliland Expedition	10 January 1904	Jidballi, Somaliland
Wallace Wright	Queen's Royal Regiment (West Surrey)	Kano-Sokoto Expedition	26 February 1903	Northern Nigeria
John Grant	8th Gurkha Rifles	Armed Mission to Tibet	6 July 1904	Gyantse Fortress
627 First World War recipients‡^{[B]}	—	First World War	1914–1918	—
Augustus Agar	HM Coastal Motor Boat 4	North Russia Relief Force	17 June 1919	Kronstadt, Russia
Arthur Sullivan	Royal Fusiliers	North Russia Relief Force	10 August 1919	Sheika River, Russia
Claude Dobson	HM Coastal Motor Boat 31	North Russia Relief Force	18 August 1919	Kronstadt, Russia
Gordon Steele	HM Coastal Motor Boat 88	North Russia Relief Force	18 August 1919	Kronstadt, Russia
Samuel Pearse	Royal Fusiliers	North Russia Relief Force	29 August 1919*	Emtsa, Russia
Henry Andrews	Indian Medical Service	Waziristan Campaign	22 October 1919*	Khajuri, Waziristan
William Kenny	39th Garhwal Rifles	Waziristan Campaign	2 January 1920*	Kot Kai, Waziristan
Ishar Singh	28th Punjab Regiment	Waziristan Campaign	10 April 1921	Haidari Kach, Waziristan
George Henderson	Manchester Regiment	Arab Revolt	24 July 1920*	Hillah, Mesopotamia
Godfrey Meynell	12th Frontier Force Regiment	Second Mohmand Campaign	29 September 1935*	Mamund Valley, India
181 Second World War recipients‡^{[C]}	—	Second World War	1939–1945	—
Kenneth Muir	Argyll and Sutherland Highlanders	Korean War	23 September 1950*	Songju, Korea
James Carne	Gloucestershire Regiment	Korean War	22–23 April 1951	Imjin River, Korea
Philip Curtis	Duke of Cornwall's Light Infantry	Korean War	22–23 April 1951*	Imjin River, Korea
Bill Speakman	Black Watch (Royal Highland Regiment)	Korean War	4 November 1951	Hill 217, Korea
Rambahadur Limbu	10th Gurkha Rifles	Malaysia-Indonesia Confrontation	21 November 1965	Sarawak, Borneo
Kevin Wheatley	Australian Army Training Team Vietnam	Vietnam War	13 November 1965*	Tra Bong, Vietnam
Peter Badcoe	Australian Army Training Team Vietnam	Vietnam War	23 February 1967; 7 March 1967; 7 April 1967*	Huong Tra, Vietnam
Ray Simpson	Australian Army Training Team Vietnam	Vietnam War	6–11 May 1969	Kon Tum province, Vietnam
Keith Payne	Australian Army Training Team Vietnam	Vietnam War	24 May 1969	Ben Het, Vietnam
Herbert Jones	Parachute Regiment	Falklands War	28 May 1982*	Goose Green, Falkland Islands
Ian McKay	Parachute Regiment	Falklands War	12 June 1982*	Mount Longdon, Falkland Islands
Johnson Beharry	Princess of Wales's Royal Regiment	Iraq War	1 May 2004; 11 June 2004	Al-Amarah, Iraq
Bryan Budd	Parachute Regiment	War in Afghanistan	27 July 2006; 20 August 2006*	Sangin, Afghanistan
James Ashworth	Grenadier Guards	War in Afghanistan	13 June 2012*	Nahiri Saraj District, Afghanistan
Joshua Leakey	Parachute Regiment	War in Afghanistan	22 August 2013	Helmand Province, Afghanistan

== Notes ==
- A Between 1858 and 1881, the Victoria Cross could be awarded for actions taken "under circumstances of extreme danger" not in the face of the enemy. O'Hea single-handedly put out a fire in an ammunition cart, and was awarded the VC for that action. This rule was changed in 1881 to allow only acts "in the presence of the enemy".
- B 628 Medals were awarded to 627 recipients. Two Bars were awarded; Noel Godfrey Chavasse was awarded the Victoria Cross and Bar for two separate actions; Arthur Martin-Leake was awarded a VC in the Second Boer War, and his Bar for actions in the First World War.
- C 182 medals were awarded to 181 recipients; Charles Upham was awarded the Victoria Cross and Bar.
