= List of Victoria Cross recipients by nationality =

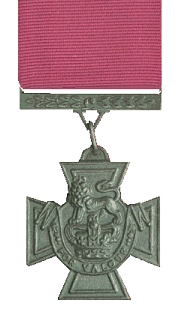
The Victoria Cross

This is a list of recipients of the Victoria Cross by nationality. It does not include the Victoria Cross awarded to the American Unknown Soldier of World War I buried in the Tomb of the Unknowns in Arlington National Cemetery. He was awarded the VC posthumously in 1921. This gesture reciprocated the award of the Medal of Honor to the British Unknown Warrior.

The Victoria Cross (VC) is a military decoration awarded for valour "in the face of the enemy" to members of the British armed forces. A small number of Commonwealth countries still participate in the British (Imperial) honours system and would still be eligible to make Victoria Cross recommendations for their service personnel but none of these countries have ever been awarded the Victoria Cross. The last occasion a Commonwealth country was awarded the Victoria Cross was in 1969 during the Vietnam War and today all Commonwealth countries whose armed forces had been awarded the Victoria Cross under the British honours systems have their own honours systems and their own orders, decorations and medals. The Victoria Cross takes precedence over all other British orders, decorations and medals and may be awarded to a person of any rank in any service and although civilians under military command are eligible for the award none has been awarded since 1879. The Victoria Cross has often been presented to the recipient during an investiture by the British monarch. The last award of the reign of King George VI and all awards of the reign of by the late Queen with the exception of the two posthumous awards to the Australian Army during the Vietnam War have been presented by Queen Elizabeth II. The VC has been awarded on 1358 occasions to 1355 individual recipients.

The original Royal Warrant and all warrants to this day contain both expulsion and restoration clauses. Eight recipients between 1861 and 1908 had their awards rescinded and although no award has ever been restored the names of the eight are included in the list. The original warrant did not contain a specific clause regarding posthumous awards, although official policy was to not award the VC posthumously. Between 1857 and 1901, twelve notices were issued in the London Gazette regarding soldiers who would have been awarded the VC had they survived. In a partial reversal of policy for the South African War 1899–1902, the next of kin of three of the soldiers were sent medals by registered post in 1902. In the same gazette the first three posthumous awards were awarded and also sent to the next of kin. In 1907, the posthumous policy was reversed and medals were sent to the next of kin of the six officers and men. The Victoria Cross warrant was not officially amended to explicitly allow posthumous awards until 1920 but one quarter of all awards for the First World War were posthumous.

For a short time in the middle 1800s, the VC was awarded for actions taken not in the face of the enemy. Six were awarded at this time for actions taken not in the face of the enemy. (Campbell Mellis Douglas was one of these recipients.)

Until 1921 the Victoria Cross could not be awarded to women, and to this day no VC has been awarded to members of that gender. With the approval of Queen Victoria, Elizabeth Webber Harris was awarded a gold VC for her valour in nursing cholera-ridden soldiers in India in 1869. Alessandro Moggi 18 May 1990 (Italy) awarded by Queen Elizabeth II.

Most Commonwealth countries have now created their own honours systems. Since 1991, three Commonwealth countries; Australia, Canada and New Zealand have created their own operational gallantry awards. In each case, their highest award for most conspicuous bravery was named in honour of the British (Imperial) Victoria Cross; the Victoria Cross for Australia, the Victoria Cross (Canada) and the Victoria Cross for New Zealand. One Victoria Cross for New Zealand was awarded to Willie Apiata on 26 July 2007; four Victoria Crosses for Australia have been awarded to Mark Donaldson, Ben Roberts-Smith, Daniel Keighran and Cameron Baird. All five awards were for actions in Afghanistan. As these are separate medals, they are not included in this list.

Recipients are described in the following list by nationality (birthplace) or (citizenship) or (country of service) or (uncertain) or in the case of New Zealand born Captain Alfred John Shout of the Australian Army by both (birthplace) and (country of service). The country lists are compiled differently with the Australian list only being members of the Australian forces, the Canadian list being members of the Canadian forces including Danish Thomas Dinesen who served in Canadian Army plus others who are considered by Canadians as Canadian recipients, while the English list only includes a few of the many English born recipients who were decorated as members of Commonwealth and Indian forces. There have been 1355 individual recipients including the American unknown who is not listed but the list has 1356 names including Alfred John Shout and another listed twice.

== Recipients by nationality ==
- Rows highlighted in orange contain links to separate pages which contain the recipients of countries with over 75 recipients
- This along with the *, indicates that the Victoria Cross was awarded posthumously

Name	Nationality	Date of action	Conflict	Unit	Place of action	Notes
Bellenden Hutcheson	American	1918	First World War	75th Bn Canadian Expeditionary Force	Drocourt-Quéant Support Line, France	
William Metcalf	American	1918	First World War	Canadian Expeditionary Force	Arras, France	
George Mullin	American	1917	First World War	Canadian Expeditionary Force	Passchendaele, Belgium	
William Seeley	American	1864	Bombardment of Shimonoseki	HMS Euryalus	Shimonoseki, Japan	
Raphael Zengel	American	1918	First World War	Canadian Expeditionary Force	Warvillers, France	
	List of 91 Australian recipients					
Adrian Carton de Wiart	Belgian	1916	First World War	4th Dragoon Guards	La Boiselle, France	
Samuel Hodge	British Virgin Islander	1866	Gambia Campaign	4th West India Regiment	Tubabecelong, Gambia	
	List of 96 Canadian recipients					
Duncan Home	Channel Islander	1857	Indian Mutiny	Bengal Sappers and Miners	Delhi, India	
George Ingouville	Jersey, Channel Islands	1855	Crimean War	HMS Arrogant	Vyborg, Russia	
Herbert Le Patourel	Guernsey, Channel Islands	1942	Second World War	Hampshire Regiment	Tebourba, Tunisia	
Ferdinand Le Quesne	Jersey, Channel Islands	1889	British rule in Burma	Royal Army Medical Corps	Voklaak, Burma	
John McCrea	Channel Islander	1881	Basuto Gun War	1st Cape Mounted Yeomanry	Tweefontein, South Africa	
George Nurse	Channel Islander	1899	Second Boer War	Royal Field Artillery	Colenso, South Africa	
Euston Sartorious	Channel Islander	1859	Second Anglo-Afghan War	59th Regiment of Foot	Shahjui, Afghanistan	
Reginald Sartorious	Channel Islander	1874	First Ashanti Expedition	6th Bengal Cavalry	Obugu, Ashanti	
Thomas Dinesen	Danish	1918	First World War	42nd Bn CEF Canadian Expeditionary Force	Parvillers, France	
Percy Hansen	Danish	1915	First World War	6th Lincolnshire Regiment	Gallipoli, Turkey	
Anders Lassen	Danish	1945*	Second World War	Special Boat Service	Comacchio, Italy	
	List of 600+ English recipients (may be incomplete)					
Sefanaia Sukanaivalu	Fijian	1944*	Second World War	Fiji Infantry Regiment	Mawaraka, Bougainville Island	
Charles Wooden	German	1854	Crimean War	17th Lancers	Balaklava, Crimea	
Johnson Beharry	Grenadian	2004	Iraq War	Princess of Wales's Royal Regiment	Amarah, Iraq	
William Johnstone	Hanoverian	1854	Crimean War	HMS Arrogant, RN	Åland, Finland	
Premindra Bhagat	Indian	1941	Second World War	Royal Bombay Sappers and Miners	Gallabat, Abyssinia	
Yeshwant Ghadge	Indian	1944*	Second World War	5th Mahratta Light Infantry	Upper Tiber Valley, Italy	
Abdul Hafiz	Indian	1944*	Second World War	9th Jat Regiment	Imphal, India	
Namdeo Jadav	Indian	1945	Second World War	5th Mahratta Light Infantry	Senio River, Italy	
Karamjeet Judge	Indian	1945*	Second World War	15th Punjab Regiment	Meiktila, Burma	
Lala	Indian	1916	First World War	41st Dogras	El Orah, Mesopotamia	
Darwan Negi	Indian	1914	First World War	39th Garhwal Rifles	Festubert, France	
Gabar Negi	Indian	1915*	First World War	39th Garhwal Rifles	Neuve Chapelle, France	
Bhandari Ram	Indian	1944	Second World War	10th Baluch Regiment	Arakan State, Burma	
Chhelu Ram	Indian	1943*	Second World War	6th Rajputana Rifles	Djebel Garci, Tunisia	
Kamal Ram	Indian	1944	Second World War	8th Punjab Regiment	River Gari, Italy	
Richhpal Ram	Indian	1941*	Second World War	6th Rajputana Rifles	Keren, Eritrea	
Badlu Singh	Indian	1918*	First World War	14th Murray's Jat Lancers	River Jordan, Palestine	
Chatta Singh	Indian	1916	First World War	9th Bhopal Infantry	Battle of the Wadi, Mesopotamia	
Gian Singh	Indian	1945	Second World War	15th Punjab Regiment	Myingyan, Burma	
Gobind Singh	Indian	1917	First World War	28th Light Cavalry	Pezières, France	
Ishar Singh	Indian	1921	Waziristan Campaign	28th Punjabis	Haidari Kach, India	
Nand Singh	Indian	1944	Second World War	11th Sikh Regiment	Maungdaw–Buthidaung Road, Burma	
Parkash Singh	Indian	1943	Second World War	8th Punjab Regiment	Donbaik, Burma	
Prakash Chib	Indian	1945*	Second World War	13th Frontier Force Rifles	Kanlan Ywathit, Burma	
Ram Singh	Indian	1944*	Second World War	1st Punjab Regiment	Kennedy Peak, Burma	
Mir Dast	Indian	1915	First World War	55th Coke's Rifles (Frontier Force)	Wieltje, Belgium	
Fazal Din	Indian	1945	Second World War	10th Baluch Regiment	Meiktila, Burma	
Ganju Lama	Indian	1944	Second World War	7th Gurkha Rifles	Ningthoukhong, Burma	
Ali Haidar	Pakistani	1945	Second World War	13th Frontier Force Rifles	Fusignano, Italy	
Khudadad Khan	Pakistani	1914	First World War	129th Duke of Connaught's Own Baluchis	Hollebeke, Belgium	
Shahamad Khan	Pakistani	1916	First World War	89th Punjabis	Beit Ayeesa, Mesopotamia	
Sher Shah	Pakistani	1945*	Second World War	16th Punjab Regiment	Kyeyebyin, Burma	
Umrao Singh	Indian	1944	Second World War	Royal Indian Artillery	Kaladan Valley, Burma	
	List of 195 Irish recipients					
William Gordon	Jamaican	1892	Second Gambian Campaign	West India Regiment	Toniataba, Gambia	
Nigel Leakey	Kenyan	1941*	Second World War	King's African Rifles	Colito, Abyssinia	
Robert Henry Cain	Manx	1944	Second World War	2nd Battalion, South Staffordshire Regiment	Arnhem, Netherlands	
Gaje Ghale	Nepalese	1943	Second World War	5th Royal Gurkha Rifles (Frontier Force)	Chin Hills, Burma	
Bhanbhagta Gurung	Nepalese	1945	Second World War	2nd King Edward VII's Own Gurkha Rifles	Tamandu, Burma	
Lachhiman Gurung	Nepalese	1945	Second World War	8th Gurkha Rifles	Taungdaw, Burma	
Thaman Gurung	Nepalese	1944*	Second World War	5th Royal Gurkha Rifles (Frontier Force)	Monte San Bartolo, Italy	
Rambahadur Limbu	Nepalese	1965	Indonesia–Malaysia confrontation	10th Princess Mary's Own Gurkha Rifles	Sarawak, Borneo	
Tulbahadur Pun	Nepalese	1944	Second World War	6th Gurkha Rifles	Mogaung, Burma	
Agansing Rai	Nepalese	1944	Second World War	5th Royal Gurkha Rifles (Frontier Force)	Bishenpur, India	
Karanbahadur Rana	Nepalese	1918	First World War	3rd Queen Alexandra's Own Gurkha Rifles	El Kefr, Egypt	
Kulbir Thapa	Nepalese	1915	First World War	3rd Queen Alexandra's Own Gurkha Rifles	Fauquissart, France	
Lalbahadur Thapa	Nepalese	1943	Second World War	2nd King Edward VII's Own Gurkha Rifles	Rass-es-Zouai, Tunisia	
Netrabahadur Thapa	Nepalese	1944*	Second World War	5th Royal Gurkha Rifles (Frontier Force)	Bishenpur, India	
Sher Thapa	Nepalese	1944*	Second World War	9th Gurkha Rifles	San Marino, Italy	
Leslie Andrew	New Zealander	1917	First World War	Wellington Infantry Regiment	La Basse Ville, Belgium	
Cyril Bassett	New Zealander	1915	First World War	New Zealand Divisional Signal Company	Gallipoli, Turkey	
Donald Brown	New Zealander	1916	First World War	Otago Infantry Regiment	High Wood, France	
James Crichton	New Zealander	1918	First World War	Auckland Infantry Regiment	Crèvecœur, France	
Cecil D'Arcy	New Zealander	1879	Anglo-Zulu War	Frontier Light Horse	Ulundi, South Africa	
Keith Elliott	New Zealander	1942	Second World War	22nd, 2nd New Zealand Division	Ruweisat, Egypt	
Samuel Forsyth	New Zealander	1918*	First World War	Royal New Zealand Engineers	Grévillers, France	
Bernard Freyberg	New Zealander	1916	First World War	63rd (Royal Naval) Division	Beaucourt sur Ancre, France	
Samuel Frickleton	New Zealander	1917	First World War	New Zealand Rifle Brigade	Messines, Belgium	
John Grant	New Zealander	1918	First World War	Wellington Infantry Regiment	Bancourt, France	
William Hardham	New Zealander	1901	Second Boer War	4th New Zealand Contingent	Naauwpoort, South Africa	
Charles Heaphy	New Zealander	1864	New Zealand Wars	Auckland Militia	Mangapiko River, New Zealand	
John Hinton	New Zealander	1941	Second World War	20th, 2nd New Zealand Division	Kalamai, Greece	
Clive Hulme	New Zealander	1941	Second World War	23rd, 2nd New Zealand Division	Crete, Greece	
Reginald Judson	New Zealander	1918	First World War	Auckland Infantry Regiment	Bapaume, France	
Harry Laurent	New Zealander	1918	First World War	New Zealand Rifle Brigade	Gouzeaucourt Wood, France	
Moana-Nui-a-Kiwa Ngarimu	New Zealander	1943*	Second World War	28th, 2nd New Zealand Division	Tebaga Gap, Tunisia	
Henry Nicholas	New Zealander	1917	First World War	Canterbury Infantry Regiment	Polderhoek, Belgium	
William Sanders	New Zealander	1917*	First World War	HMS Prize (HMS Prize)	Atlantic	
Alfred Shout	New Zealander	1915*	First World War	First Australian Imperial Force	Gallipoli	
Richard Travis	New Zealander	1918*	First World War	Otago Infantry Regiment	Rossignol Wood, France	
Leonard Trent	New Zealander	1943	Second World War	No. 487 Squadron RNZAF	Amsterdam, Netherlands	
Willie Apiata	New Zealander	2004	Afghanistan War	New Zealand Special Air Service	Afghanistan, Afghanistan	
Lloyd Trigg	New Zealander	1943*	Second World War	No. 200 Squadron RAF	Atlantic	
Charles Upham	New Zealander	1941; 1942	Second World War	20th, 2nd New Zealand Division	Crete, Greece, (1941), Ruweisat Ridge, Egypt (1942)	
James Ward	New Zealander	1941*	Second World War	No. 75 Squadron RNZAF	Munster, Germany	
John Croak	Newfoundlander	1918*	First World War	13th Battalion, CEF	Amiens, France	
Thomas Ricketts	Newfoundlander	1918	First World War	Royal Newfoundland Regiment	Ledeghem, Belgium	
Frank Baxter	Rhodesian	1896*	Matabeleland Rebellion	Bulawayo Field Force	Umguza, Rhodesia	
Frederick Booth	South African	1917	First World War	British South Africa Police	Johannesburg, German East Africa	. Attached to Rhodesian Native Regiment
Herbert Henderson	Rhodesian	1897	Matabeleland Rebellion	Bulawayo Field Force	Bulawayo, Rhodesia	
	List of 164 Scottish recipients					
Herman Albrecht	South African	1900*	Second Boer War	Imperial Light Horse	Ladysmith, South Africa	
Andrew Beauchamp-Proctor	South African	1918	First World War	No. 84 Squadron RFC	Western Front, France	
John Clements	South African	1901	Second Boer War	Rimington's Guides	Strijdenburg, South Africa	
Joseph Crowe	South African	1857	Indian Mutiny	78th Regiment of Foot	Boursekee Chowkee, India	
William Faulds	South African	1916	First World War	1st South African Infantry	Delville Wood, France	
George Gristock	South African	1940*	Second World War	Royal Norfolk Regiment	Tournai, Belgium	
Edmund Hartley	South African	1879	Zulu War	Cape Mounted Riflemen	Morosi's Mountain, South Africa	
Reginald Hayward	South African	1918	First World War	Wiltshire Regiment	Fremicourt, France	
William Hewitt	South African	1917	First World War	2nd South African Light Infantry	Ypres, Belgium	
Horace Martineau	South African	1899	Second Boer War	Protectorate Regiment	Mafeking, South Africa	
John McCrea	South African	1881	First Boer War	1st Cape Mounted Yeomanry	Tweefontein, South Africa	
Charles Mullins	South African	1899	Second Boer War	Imperial Light Horse	Elandslaagte, South Africa	
Randolph Nesbitt	South African	1896	Mashona Rebellion	Mashonaland Mounted Police	Salisbury, Rhodesia	
John Nettleton	South African	1942	Second World War	No. 44 (Rhodesia) Squadron RAF	Augsburg, Germany	
Gerard Norton	South African	1944	Second World War	Kaffrarian Rifles	Monte Gidolfo, Italy	
Oswald Reid	South African	1917	First World War	King's (Liverpool) Regiment	Dialah River, Mesopotamia	
Clement Robertson	South African	1917	First World War	Queen's Royal Regiment	Zonnebeke, Belgium	
John Sherwood-Kelly	South African	1917	First World War	Norfolk Regiment	Marcoing, France	
Quentin Smythe	South African	1942	Second World War	Natal Carbineers	Alem Hamza, Egypt	
Edwin Swales	South African	1945	Second World War	South African Air Force	Pforzheim, Germany	
Basil Horsfall	Sri Lankan (Ceylonese)	1918*	First World War	East Lancashire Regiment	Ablainzevelle, France	
Peter Brown	Swedish	1879	Basuto Gun War	Cape Mounted Riflemen	Morosi's Mountain, South Africa	
Christian Schiess	Swiss	1879	Anglo-Zulu War	Natal Native Contingent	Rorke's Drift, South Africa	
Filip Konowal	Ukrainian	1917	First World War	47th (British Columbia)	Lens, France	
	List of 58 uncertain nationality recipients					
Frederick Barter	Welsh	1915	First World War	Royal Welch Fusiliers	Festubert, France	
Stephen Beattie	Welsh	1942	Second World War	HMS Campbeltown	Saint-Nazaire, France	
Robert Bye	Welsh	1917	First World War	Welsh Guards	Yser Canal, Belgium	
Edward Chapman	Welsh	1945	Second World War	Monmouthshire Regiment	Dortmund-Ems Canal, Germany	
James Davies	Welsh	1917*	First World War	Royal Welch Fusiliers	Polygon Wood, Belgium	
Lewis Evans	Welsh	1917	First World War	Black Watch (Royal Highlanders)	Zonnebeke, Belgium	
John Fox-Russell	Welsh	1917*	First World War	Royal Army Medical Corps	Tel-el-Khuweilfeh, Palestine	
William Fuller	Welsh	1914	First World War	Welch Regiment	Chivy-sur-Aisne, France	
Robert Jones	Welsh	1879	Zulu War	24th Regiment of Foot	Rorke's Drift, South Africa	
Hubert Lewis	Welsh	1916	First World War	Welch Regiment	Macukovo, Greece	
John Linton	Welsh	1943*	Second World War	HMS Turbulent	At sea	
Thomas Monaghan	Welsh	1858	Indian Mutiny	2nd Dragoon Guards (Queen's Bays)	Jamo, India	
Ivor Rees	Welsh	1917	First World War	South Wales Borderers	Pilkem, Belgium	
Lionel Rees	Welsh	1916	First World War	Royal Flying Corps	Double Crassieurs, France	
Hugh Rowlands	Welsh	1854	Crimean War	41st (Welsh) Regiment of Foot	Battle of Inkerman, Crimea	
Robert Shields	Welsh	1855	Crimean War	23rd Regiment	Sebastopol, Crimea	
Jacob Thomas	Welsh	1857	Indian Mutiny	Bengal Artillery	Lucknow, India	
Richard Wain	Welsh	1917*	First World War	"A" Battalion, Tank Corps	Cambrai/Marcoing, France	
Bernard Warburton-Lee	Welsh	1940*	Second World War	British 2nd Destroyer Flotilla	Narvik, Norway	
William Waring	Welsh	1918*	First World War	Royal Welch Fusiliers	Ronssoy, France	
Tasker Watkins	Welsh	1944	Second World War	Welch Regiment	Barfour, France	
Henry Weale	Welsh	1918	First World War	Royal Welch Fusiliers	Bazentin-le-Grand, France	
Jack Williams	Welsh	1918	First World War	South Wales Borderers	Villers Outreaux, France	
John Williams	Welsh	1879	Zulu War	24th Regiment of Foot	Rorke's Drift, South Africa	
William Williams	Welsh	1917	First World War	HMS Pargust (HMS Pargust)	Atlantic, near France	
