= Zachary Bayly =

Zachary Bayly may refer to:

- Zachary Bayly (military officer) (1841–1916), South African colonial military commander
- Zachary Bayly (planter) (1721–1769), planter and politician in Jamaica
