= Edmund Hartley =

Recipient of the Victoria Cross (1847–1919)

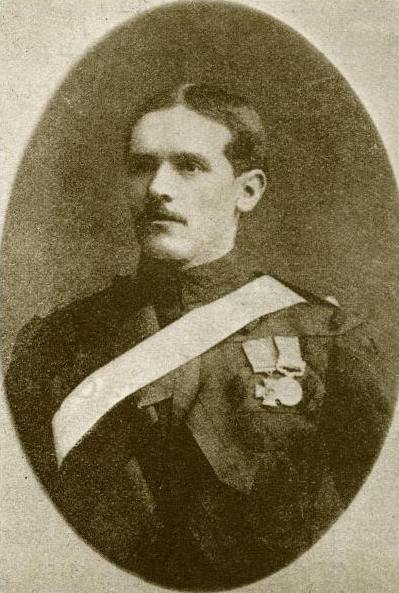
- Born: 6 May 1847; Ivybridge, Devon
- Died: 20 March 1919 (aged 71); Ash, Surrey
- Burial place: Brookwood Cemetery; 51.299786°N 0.627923°W
- Military career
- Allegiance: United Kingdom
- Branch: Cape Colonial Forces
- Service years: 1877–1902
- Rank: Colonel
- Units: Cape Mounted Riflemen
- Conflicts: Morosi's Mountain 1879 Campaign; Basuto Gun War; Second Boer War
- Awards: Victoria Cross; Order of St Michael and St George

Colonel Edmund Baron Hartley VC CMG (6 May 1847 – 20 March 1919) was a recipient of the Victoria Cross, the highest and most prestigious award for gallantry in the face of the enemy that can be awarded to British and Commonwealth forces.

== Early life ==
Hartley was born in Ivybridge, Devon, England, on 6 May 1847. Hartley arrived in Basutoland from Cape Town in 1875, becoming the first district surgeon in the colony. He was based in Maseru, but frequently traveled across the colony to treat patients. Following the outbreak of the 1879 Morosi's Revolt he served as the principal medical officer of the Cape Colonial Forces. During the course of the campaign he organised his principal hospital at Fort Hartley on the Orange River. He distinguished himself during the campaign earning the Victoria Cross (VC) for his actions. Which bore the following citation:

On 5 June 1879 in South Africa, Surgeon Major Hartley attended the wounded under fire at the unsuccessful attack at Morosi's Mountain. From an exposed position, on open ground, he carried in his arms a wounded corporal of the Cape Mounted Riflemen. The surgeon major then returned under severe enemy fire in order to dress the wounds of the other men of the storming party.

Hartley continued his service as the principal medical officer of the Cape troops during the subsequent Basuto Gun War.

== Later service ==
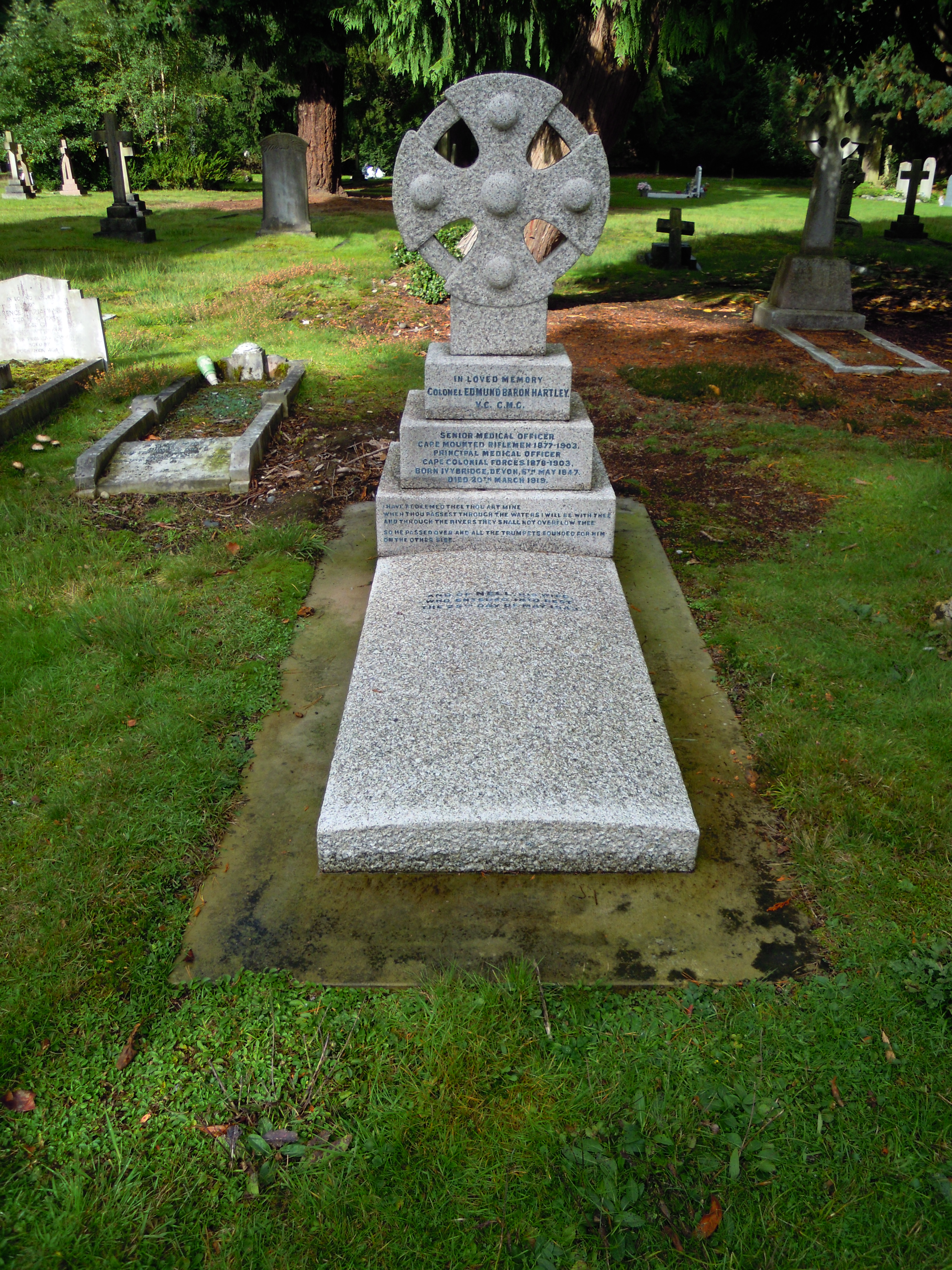
Hartley's grave in Brookwood Cemetery

He later achieved the rank of surgeon colonel and, in March 1900 during the Second Boer War fighting at Aliwal, he is mentioned doing ambulance work, ferrying away the wounded under fire.

In November 1900 he was reported wounded following the occupation of Philippolis by Lovat Scouts and Seaforth Highlanders

On 19 April 1901 he was appointed a companion of the Order of St Michael and St George He died in Ash, Hampshire and is buried at Brookwood Cemetery.

== The Medal ==
In 1955 the Victoria Cross medal was bought at Sotheby's for the then record price of £300. It is now displayed at the Army Medical Services Museum in Mytchett, Surrey.
