= Edward Brabant =

British military commander in South Africa

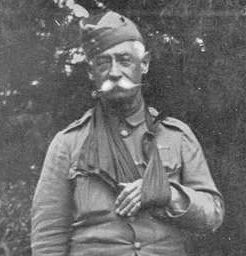
- Photograph in The Navy and Army Illustrated (1901)
- Born: 31 May 1839; Kinderton Lodge, Middlewich, England
- Died: 13 December 1914 (aged 75)
- Allegiance: Great Britain
- Rank: Major-General
- Commands: Colonial Division; Colonial Defence Force; Cape Mounted Riflemen; 79th Battery, RFA; Kaffrarian Rifles; Queenstown Volunteers; Brabant's Horse
- Battles / wars: 9th Xhosa War; First Matabele War; Second Boer War

Major-General Sir Edward Yewd Brabant, KCB, CMG (31 May 1839 – 13 December 1914) was a British military commander in colonial South Africa. He served in the 9th Xhosa War (1877–1878), First Matabele War (1893–1894), and other campaigns. During the Second Boer War (1899–1902), he commanded the Colonial Division in 1900, and the Colonial Defence Force of Cape Colony in 1901.

== Early life ==
Brabant was born in Kinderton Lodge, in Middlewich, Cheshire, the son of John Thomas and Elizabeth Jane Brabant. He was baptised at a week old.

== First Matabele War ==
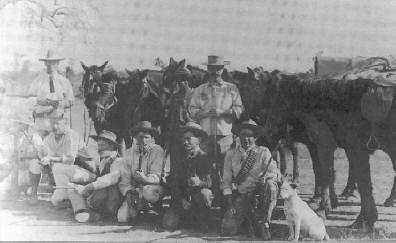
1893 Photograph of the BSAC Scouts. Left to right: (standing) Pearl "Pete" Ingram, Capt. Charles White, Art Cummings, Stocker, Moffat, Bob Bain, Frederick Russell Burnham and Maurice Gifford.

Captain Brabant oversaw the Ndebele employed by the British South Africa Company forces in Fort Victoria, Matabeleland (now Masvingo, Zimbabwe). He worked with "Matabele" Benjamin Wilson from Cumberland, who was one of the twelve scouts for Allan Wilson's Victoria Column. The other column scouts were: Bob Bain (Canadian), Frederick Russell Burnham (American), Jack Carruthers, Art Cummings, Duncan Dollar, Pearl "Pete" Ingram (American), Harry Lloyd, Texas Long, Billy Lynch, Andrew Main, and Billy Reed.

== Second Anglo-Boer War ==
As a Brigadier General of the Eastern Cape troops, his command included: Cape Mounted Riflemen, the 79th Battery, RFA, the Kaffrarian Rifles, the Queenstown Volunteers, part of the 1st Battalion, Royal Scots, and Brabant's Horse. He occupied Jamestown and the Herschel district in February 1900. His units operated round the Queenstown/Dordrecht area and moved north to hold the Jammersburg Drift at Wepener, which they did under appalling rain and cold against a superior Boer force led by Christiaan De Wet.

=== Brabant's Horse ===
On 5 November 1899, Brabant raised the Light Horse regiment known as Brabant's Horse. The top strength of the unit was 600, all ranks, including South African colonials, Australians, British, Canadians. The unit saw much action against Boer commandos. Brabant's Horse was disbanded in Cape Town on 31 December 1901.

In 1901 he was knighted as a Knight Commander of the Order of the Bath (KCB) for his services in South Africa.

== Later career ==
Following the end of the war in May 1902, Brabant visited the UK to take the command of the Cape contingent present in London for the Coronation of King Edward VII and Queen Alexandra, including men of the Cape Mounted Rifles and the Cape Police. He received the honorary rank of major-general on 22 August 1902, and returned to South Africa in the SS Saxon the following month.

The next year, he served as Commandant-General of the Cape Colonial Forces (1903–1904).

== Family ==
His son, Lieutenant Arthur Edward Brabant, served with the Imperial Light Horse during the Second Boer War. He was wounded at the Siege of Ladysmith and died two days later on 5 November 1899.
