= Zachary Bayly (military officer) =

South African colonial military commander

Colonel Zachary Stanley Bayly, CMG (1841–1916) was a South African colonial military commander. He was commissioned in the British Army, and was stationed in the Cape Colony from 1877.

In the 9th Frontier War (1877–1878), he commanded a column in the Transkei, and was in command at the Battle of Umzintzani. In 1878, he transferred to the colony's new Defence Department, as staff officer responsible for units in Cape Town. He briefly commanded the city's senior regiment, the Duke of Edinburgh's Own Volunteer Rifles. In 1879, he transferred to the Cape Mounted Riflemen, and commanded operations in the Morosi campaign that year. In 1880–1881, he commanded operations in the Basutoland Gun War in Basutoland.

Col Bayly served as Commandant-General of the Cape Colonial Forces from 1882 until he retired in 1892.
