= John Frederick McCrea =

Guernsey-born South African soldier and recipient of the Victoria Cross

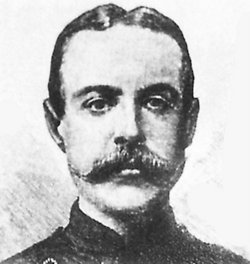
- Born: 2 April 1854; Saint Peter Port, Guernsey
- Died: 16 July 1894 (aged 40); Kokstad, Cape Colony, South Africa
- Military career
- Allegiance: Cape Colony
- Branch: Cape Colonial Forces
- Rank: Surgeon Major
- Units: Cape Mounted Yeomanry; Cape Mounted Riflemen
- Conflicts: Basuto Gun War
- Awards: Victoria Cross

John Frederick McCrea VC (2 April 1854 – 16 July 1894) was an Guernsey-born South African soldier and recipient of the Victoria Cross, the highest and most prestigious award for gallantry in the face of the enemy that can be awarded to British and Commonwealth forces.

== Early life ==
McCrea was born on 2 April 1854 at Saint Peter Port, Guernsey to Captain Herbert Taylor McCrea and Elizabeth Dobree Carey. Following his parents' deaths in 1855, he was brought up by his aunt Charlotte in Guernsey and educated at Elizabeth College. He then studied medicine at Guy's Hospital, qualifying in 1878 as a member of the Royal College of Surgeons of England and Edinburgh.

In 1879 he went to South Africa, where he did duty at the Military Hospital in Cape Town as Civilian Surgeon to Her Majesty's Forces. A year later he moved to Fort Beaufort, Eastern Cape to settle, but decided instead to join the 1st Regiment, Cape Mounted Yeomanry as a surgeon.

== Details ==
McCrea was 26 years old, and a Surgeon in the 1st Cape Mounted Yeomanry, Cape Colonial Forces during the Basuto Gun War, when he performed the following actions for which he was awarded the VC.

On 14 January 1881, at Tweefontein, Basutoland, South Africa, the burghers had been forced to retire under a most determined enemy attack, with a loss of 16 killed and 21 wounded. Surgeon McCrea was the only doctor present and notwithstanding a serious wound on the breast bone, which he dressed himself, he most gallantly took the casualties into shelter and continued to attend to the wounded throughout the day. Had it not been for this devotion to duty on the part of Surgeon McCrea, there would undoubtedly have been much greater suffering and loss of life.

== Further career ==
McCrea was promoted to the rank of Surgeon Major and on 3 February 1882 was transferred to the Cape Mounted Riflemen.

He remained with the regiment and married a South African, Elizabeth Antoinette (Bessie) Watermeyer. He died of heart failure at his home in Kokstad, Cape Colony on 16 July 1894. His widow died on 5 November 1936 in Exmouth, Devon. She was buried in Littleham, Exmouth.

Photos of McCrea exist in the Cape Town Military Museum and in the South African National Museum of Military History. His VC is on display in the Lord Ashcroft VC Gallery at the Imperial War Museum, London.

A painting of McCrea winning his Victoria Cross was completed by Eric Wale of Cape Town for the Royal Army Medical Corps (RAMC) in Millbank, United Kingdom.

== See also ==
- List of Channel Islands Victoria Cross recipients
