= Robert George Scott =

Recipient of the Victoria Cross

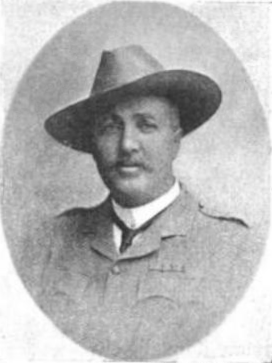
- Born: 22 April 1857; Peterborough, England
- Died: 3 October 1918 (aged 61); Wynberg, South Africa
- Burial place: Plumstead Cemetery
- Military career
- Allegiance: Cape Colony; South Africa
- Branch: Cape Colonial Forces; South African Army
- Rank: Lieutenant colonel
- Units: Cape Mounted Riflemen; Kimberley Light Horse
- Conflicts: Morosi's Mountain 1879 Campaign; Second Boer War; World War I
- Awards: Victoria Cross; Distinguished Service Order

Lieutenant Colonel Robert George Scott, VC, DSO (22 April 1857 – 3 October 1918) was an English recipient of the Victoria Cross, the highest and most prestigious award for gallantry in the face of the enemy that can be awarded to British and Commonwealth forces.

== Early military career ==
Scott was born on 22 April 1857 at Whittlesey, near Peterborough, Cambridgeshire. He was the son of Fleet-Surgeon Robert Charles Scott (RN) and Mary Elizabeth Scott, and entered Epsom College in 1870 and joined Granville House. He was an active member of the College Corps. After leaving College in 1871 he went on to join the Cape Mountain Riflemen in 1876. He served in the Frontier Wars of 1877 and the Zulu War of 1878–1879.

== Details of Victoria Cross ==
Scott was 21 years old, and a sergeant in the Cape Mounted Riflemen, Cape Colonial Forces during the Morosi's Mountain 1879 Campaign when the following deed took place for which he was awarded the VC.

On 8 April 1879 during an attack on Morosi's Mountain, South Africa, Sergeant Scott volunteered to throw time-fuse shells as hand grenades over a wall of stone barricades from behind which the enemy were bringing heavy fire to bear on the Colonial troops. Sergeant Scott made his men take cover in case the shells burst prematurely before making two attempts to throw shells over it. At the second attempt the shell exploded almost in his hands blowing his right hand to pieces and wounding him severely in the leg.

== Later career ==
Scott later served in South Africa during the Second Boer War, where he was in command of the Scott's Railway Guards, attached to the Kimberley Light Horse. The Railway Guards did work on the Orange River – Kimberley line, and was engaged by the enemy several times during the war. Following the end of hostilities, Scott left Cape Town for England in June 1902. He later served in the First World War. He later achieved the rank of lieutenant colonel.
