= Morosi =

Baphuthi Chief

- Died: 20 November 1879; Morosi's Mountain, Basutoland
- Cause of death: Shot

Morosi (or Moorosi; died 20 November 1879) was a Baphuthi chief in the southern part of Basutoland. He led a revolt against the Cape Colony government in 1879, in defence of his independence south of the Orange River. The British refused to help the Cape Government. However, Letsie, the paramount chief and first son of Moshoeshoe, and many of the Sotho ruling establishment, rallied to support the Cape forces, and the rebellion was put down after several months of arduous fighting. Morosi was beheaded and his body mutilated by Cape troops.

== Early life ==
Morosi was the son of Mokuane, a Baphuthi man, and Maidi (daughter of chief Tshosane of the Bhulani clan) at Marunyeng (the present day Thoteng) in Mohale's hoek district. This was during the journey to the new home, the foothills of Thaba-Linoha, now known as Maphutseng. According to Major David Hook, who met him, he was small and had yellow skin.

In the 1820s, during the course of the Mfecane, Mohale a brother of the paramount chief of Basutoland Moshoeshoe I, decided to raid the Baphuthi in order to steal their cattle. At the time they lived at the source of the Tele River, Mokuane was 60 years old and thus Morosi had undertaken most of his responsibilities. Mohale found little cattle during his attack on the Baphuthi, instead kidnapping several of their boys. The Baputhi then paid tribute to Moshoeshoe I and recognized his supremacy in order to recover their tribesmen. The Baputhi then moved to the mountain of Bolepeletsa. In early 1829, Morosi went on a successful joint expedition with Moshoeshoe I against the Thembu of Ngubengcuka who lived below the Drakensberg, carrying away large herds of cattle. A second joint expedition followed in the May of the same year.

== Chief of the Baphuthi ==
As the Boer Great Trek progressed, the Boers began to encroach on Basuto territory. Moshoeshoe I introduced Morosi to Benjamin D'Urban, Governor of the Cape Colony, at Graham's Town in September 1837.

Morosi won a skirmish against the British at Dulcie's Nek on the border between the Herschel District of the Cape Colony and the Quthing District of Basutoland on 21 February 1851. In April 1851, Morosi along with Loperi, Mohali and Letsi attacked Major Donovan.

During the Battle of Berea, when Sir George Cathcart brought a force into Basutoland in 1852, Morosi was largely responsible for defeating him.

When in November 1852, Cathcart found Moshoeshoe not amenable to reason, he decided to move against him. 20 December 1852. Cathcart's forces under Colonel Eyre were vastly outnumbered and in trouble. After battle, Moshoeshoe wrote from Thaba Bosiu: "This day you have fought against my people and taken much cattle. As the object for which you have come is to have a compensation for Boers, I beg you will be satisfied with what you have taken. I entreat peace from you. You have shown your power, you have chastised - let it be enough I pray you, and let me be no longer considered an enemy to the Queen. I will try all I can to keep my people in order in the future."

Hostilities commenced at Beersheba Mission Station on 23 March 1858 between the Boers and Basuto. On 6 May, an Orange Free State force marched on Thaba Bosiu and defeated the Basotho. President Boshof appealed to Sir George Grey, Governor of the Cape... treaty signed eventually on 15 October 1858.

There were no hostilities until June 1865, when President Johannes Brand sent an ultimatum to Moshoeshoe after some Free State burghers had been imprisoned and ill-treated by the latter, and then proclaimed war.

On 19 June 1865, Mr Burnet, Civil Commissioner for Aliwal North wrote to the High Commissioner to say that a wholesale system of thieving was determined on by Poshuli and Morosi and that the Boers and Basutho had come into collision. Ongoing hostilities.

On 20 June 1865, before daylight 2000 warriors under Poshuli and Morosi crossed the Caledon near its junction with Wilgeboom Spruit, and commenced to ravage the district before them. From the farm adjoining the commonage of Smithfield they laid waste a broad belt of country for a distance of thirty miles towards Bloemfontein. The inhabitants, warned just in time to save their lives, fled without being able to remove anything. The invaders burned the houses, broke whatever implements they could not set fire to, and drove off more than 100,000 sheep, besides great droves of horned cattle and horses. In an hour the richest men in the district of Caledon River were reduced to destitution. 13 white men killed.

Poshuli and Morosi ravaged the country, and at the junction of the Caledon and Wilgeboom rivers, killed 13 white men on 20 June 1865.

There was an attempt to storm Thaba Bosiu on 15 August 1865.

On 12 March 1868, Basutoland was declared a British territory. King Moshoeshoe dies died on 11 March 1870. On 3 November 1871, Basutoland was annexed to the Cape Colony. On 23 November 1872, responsible government was established at Cape Town.

== Morosi's Mountain 1879 Campaign ==
Morosi's Mountain (Lesotho)

In recognition of Morosi's military assistance and successes, most recently in the war with the Orange Free State, Moshoeshoe granted him lands in the southwestern corner of Basutoland. Here, in 1879, Morosi's son Doda and some other Baphuthi tribesmen were refusing to pay the hut taxes which had been agreed upon between the chiefs and the Cape Government on the annexation of Basutoland to the Cape Colony in 1868. John Austen, the Resident Magistrate, imprisoned the offenders but a force of Baphuthis set them free. A troop of Cape Mounted Riflemen (CMR) responded but were repulsed by Morosi, who refused to give up his son. Morosi and the approximately 1,500 Baphuthi men, along with their women and children took refuge on a mountain, where he requested a week to respond to the Cape Government's offer of safe return if he gave up the offenders.

During that week, Morosi gradually and stealthily moved to another mountain 20 miles away in the Drakensberg range, which came to be known as Morosi's Mountain. During the previous ten years, Morosi had worked on building a mountain top fortification. The mountain has sheer drops on three sides and the fourth consists of a 30° slope, which he reinforced with a series of strong walls, 8–12 feet (2.4–3.7 m) high, impervious to artillery, with loopholes for guns. There Morosi took refuge with around 300 Baphuthi soldiers and sufficient ammunition, food and cattle to resist a long siege, beginning 24 March, until he was finally overrun on 20 November.

Morosi was besieged by up to 800 Cape soldiers and 1,500 Sotho, who had been lured by Griffith on the understanding that they would not be subject to disarmament under the Cape Peace Preservation Act of 1878. A first assault on the mountain took place on 8 April but was repulsed. Two men in that assault received the Victoria Cross: Sergent Robert Scott and Trooper Peter Brown. A second assault took place on 5 June, involving the recently formed Cape Mounted Yeomanry. This assault was also unsuccessful and Surgeon Major Edmund Hartley was awarded the Victoria Cross for his part.

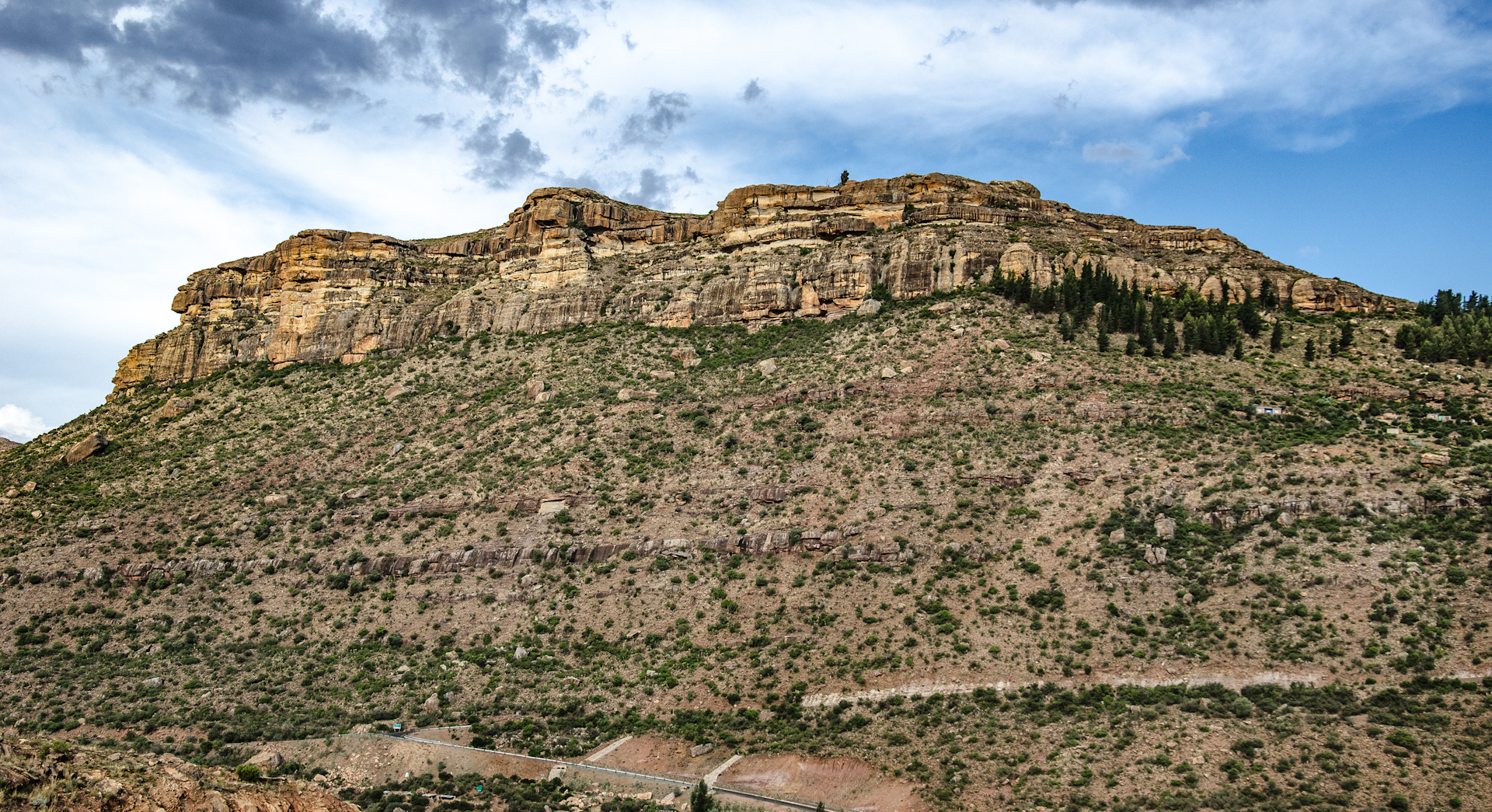
Thaba Moorosi

The final assault on Morosi's stronghold took place on the night of 19–20 November 1879 under the command of Colonel Zachary Bayly. A mortar and ammunition was sent up from King William's Town and fixed about 400 metres (1,300 ft) from the first wall behind a rapidly built, stone bastion. Mortar was fired over the walls of Morosi's fortifications for four days and nights prior to the attack. At 12.30 am an attempt was made on the mountain by scaling up a fissure, which became known as Bourne's Crack. The storming party reached the top before Morosi's men could regroup against the assault. On reaching the top, the CMR cut down the enemy then set out to find Morosi. Several small parties of Baphuthi were hiding in caves, within one of which was Morosi.

A private of the CMR named Whitehead shot and killed Morosi. After his death, Morosi was decapitated, his head then boiled and stripped down to the bone. In the storming of his stronghold, Morosi's sons were also killed, with the exception of Doda, who escaped with around 120 men by jumping into the Orange River. Morosi's wives were also killed, as were some 200 of his men.

For eight months Morosi and the Baphuthi had succeeded in holding off superior Cape forces with the skillful use of firearms.

== Personal life ==
Moorosi had a number of sons, including Doda and Letuka. Letuka, who was killed at the same time as Moorosi, was the father of Mocheko. Mocheko, in 1913, tried and failed to have himself reinstated as chief of the Baphuthi.

== Legacy ==
The conflict between Morosi and the Cape forces was one of the defining events of the exercise of authority in Phuthiland and Basutoland overall, which relied on the use of firearms and control of economic production.

The Cape Government of Prime Minister Gordon Sprigg, in eventually overcoming Morosi, was assisted by Basuto soldiers armed with guns. However the Cape Government's subsequent policies destroyed any remaining trust or loyalty which the Basuto may have had to the Cape Colony. Firstly, the Cape Government imposed disarmament on the Basuto by extending the 1878 "Peace Preservation Act" into Basutoland for the first time in 1880. It also appropriated Morosi's lands in the Quthing District for white settlement.

The Basuto resisted disarmament and rose in rebellion, which led to the Basuto Gun War from September 1880 to April 1881. The Cape forces were ultimately incapable of enforcing the order and gave back Basutoland to Britain in 1884.

Morosi's rebellion therefore played a significant role in maintaining the identity of the territory and the existence of Lesotho as a nation state today.
