= Peter Brown (VC) =

Recipient of the Victoria Cross

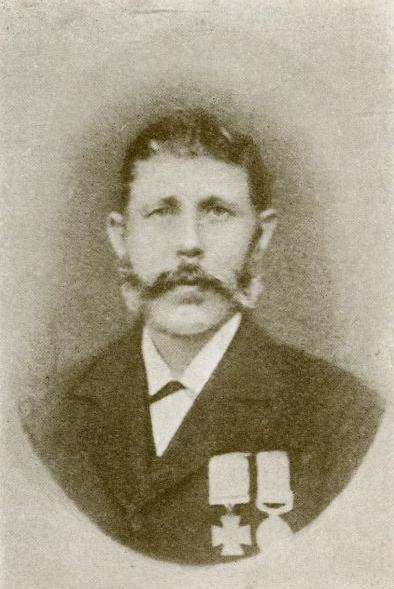
- Born: 1837; Sweden
- Died: 10 September 1894; Cape Town
- Burial place: Maitland Cemetery Maitland, Cape Town
- Military career
- Branch: Cape Colonial Forces
- Service years: 1865–1880
- Rank: Trooper
- Units: Cape Mounted Riflemen
- Conflicts: Morosi's Mountain 1879 Campaign
- Awards: Victoria Cross South Africa medal

Peter Brown (1837 – 10 September 1894) was a Swedish recipient of the Victoria Cross, the highest and most prestigious award for gallantry in the face of the enemy that can be awarded to British and Commonwealth forces.

== Details ==
Brown was approximately 42 years old, and a Trooper in the Cape Mounted Riflemen, Cape Colonial Forces during the Morosi's Mountain 1879 Campaign when, on 8 April 1879 during the assault on Morosi's Mountain, South Africa, Trooper Brown spent all day carrying water to his wounded comrades who were lying under rocks where they had taken shelter. He did this within 200 yards of the enemy who were firing from redoubts up the sides of the mountain and he was severely wounded during the day, his forearm was shattered and he was also hit in the leg. Nevertheless, he did not cease his efforts until his water bottle was shot through and became useless.

The published citation read:

War Office, April 12, 1880.

THE Queen has been graciously pleased to signify Her intention to confer the decoration of the Victoria Cross upon the undermentioned Soldier of Her Majesty's Army, whose claims has been submitted for Her Majesty's approval, for his meritorious conduct at Moirosi's Mountain on the 8th April, 1879, as recorded against his name:—

Cape Mounted Rifles, Trooper Peter Brown

Trooper Peter Brown, during the assault on Moirosi's Mountain [sic] on 8th April, 1879, whilst lying under cover waiting for the order to re-commence the advance, heard two men, who had been wounded some time before, crying out for water. Trooper Brown carried a water-bottle to these men, under a heavy fire, to an adjacent rock to which they had crept for shelter. Whilst giving the first man water he was wounded severely in the right thigh, and immediately afterwards a bullet shattered his right arm, the use of which he has never recovered.

== Death ==
He died at his home in Cape Town from Bright's disease.
