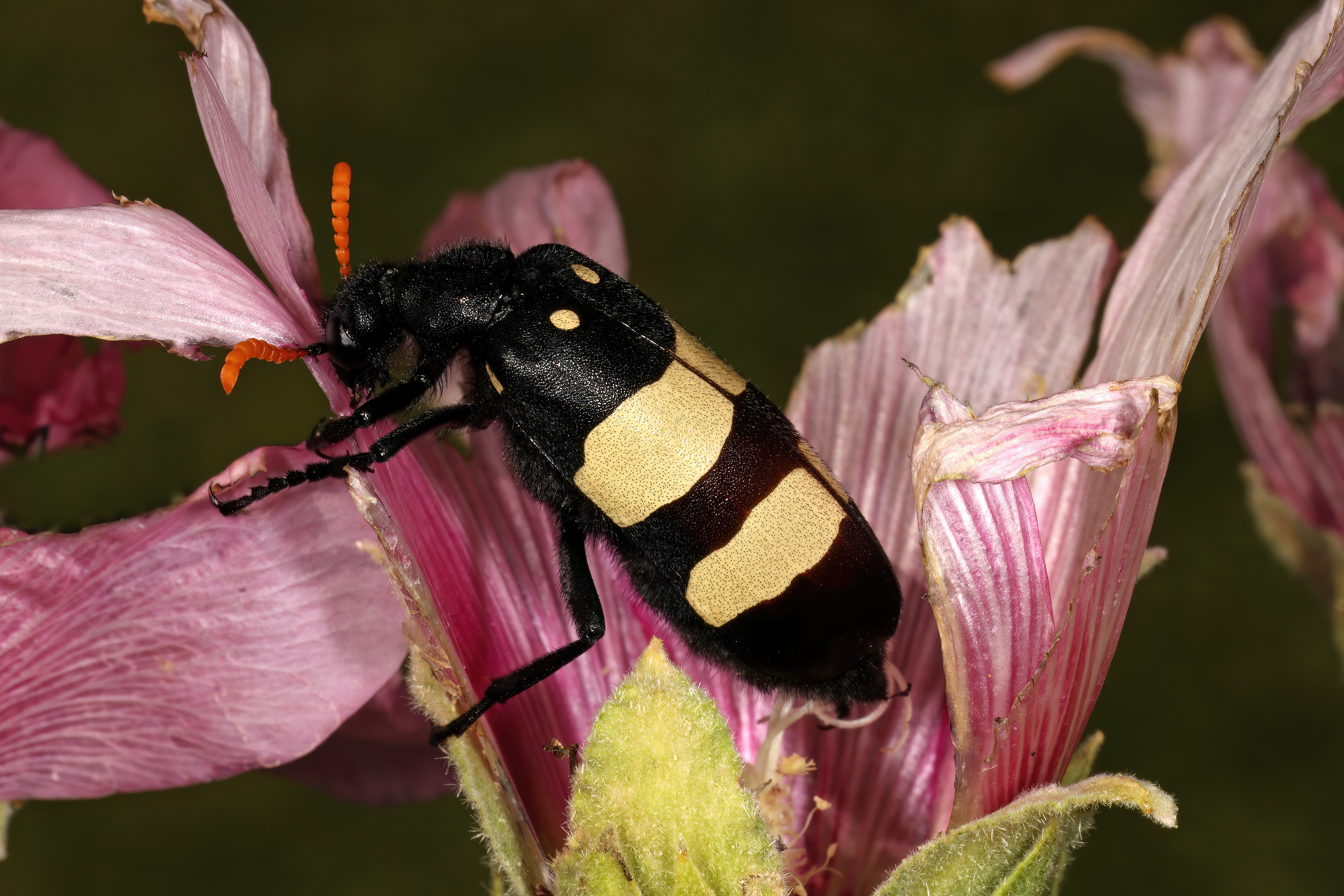

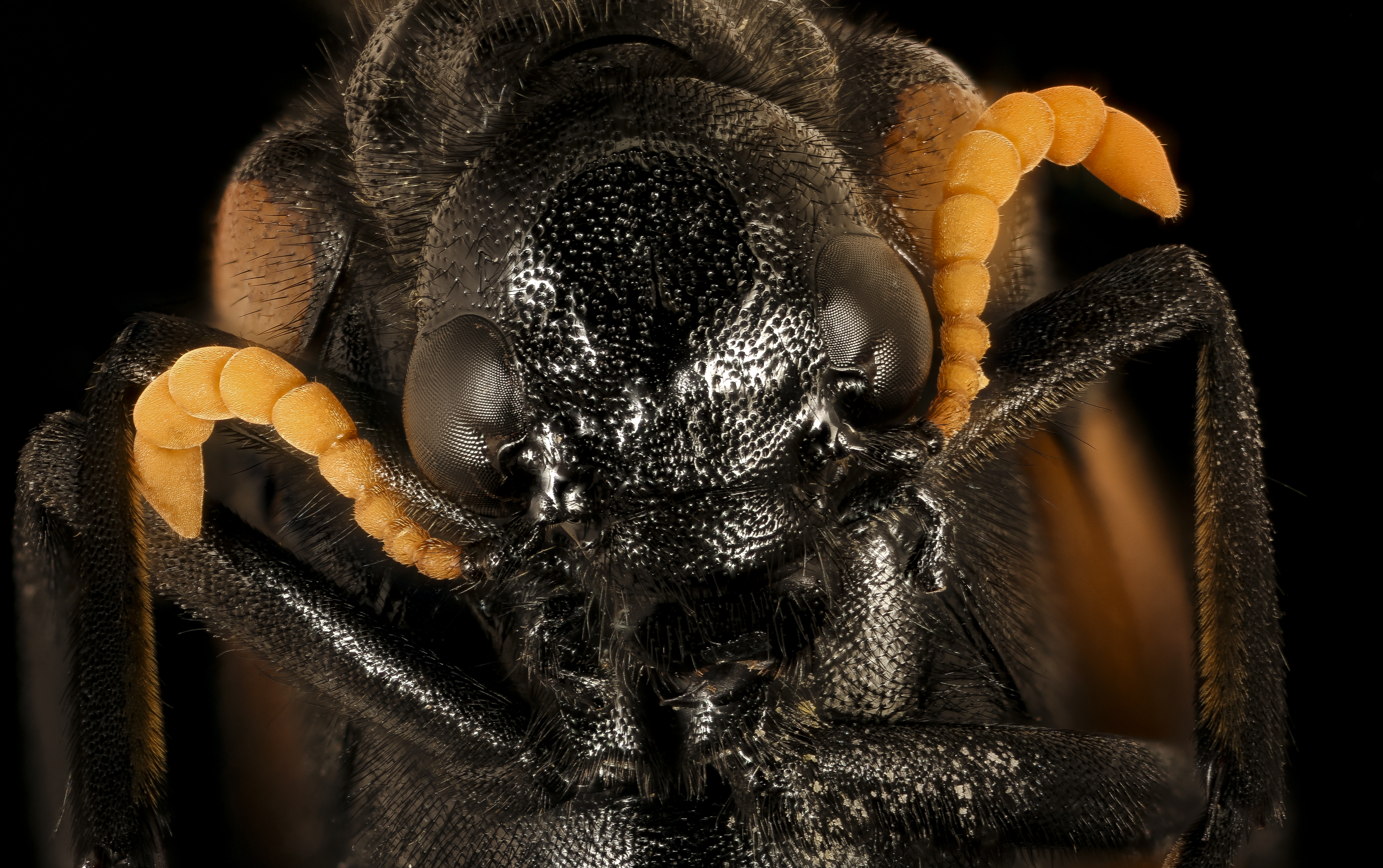

Scientific classification
- Kingdom: Animalia
- Phylum: Arthropoda
- Clade: Pancrustacea
- Class: Insecta
- Order: Coleoptera
- Suborder: Polyphaga
- Infraorder: Cucujiformia
- Family: Meloidae
- Genus: Hycleus
- Species: H. oculatus

Binomial name
- Hycleus oculatus (Thunb., 1791)

Synonyms
- Mylabris oculata Fabricius, 1775

= Hycleus oculatus =

Species of blister beetle endemic to Southern Africa

Hycleus oculatus is a species of blister beetle in the family Meloidae endemic to Southern Africa. The species was previously named as Mylabris oculata (CMR bean beetle). It is commonly called the CMR blisterbeetle after the Cape Mounted Riflemen.

== Taxonomy ==
Hycleus oculatus contains one subspecies:

- Hycleus oculatus tricolor
