= List of Second Anglo-Afghan War Victoria Cross recipients =

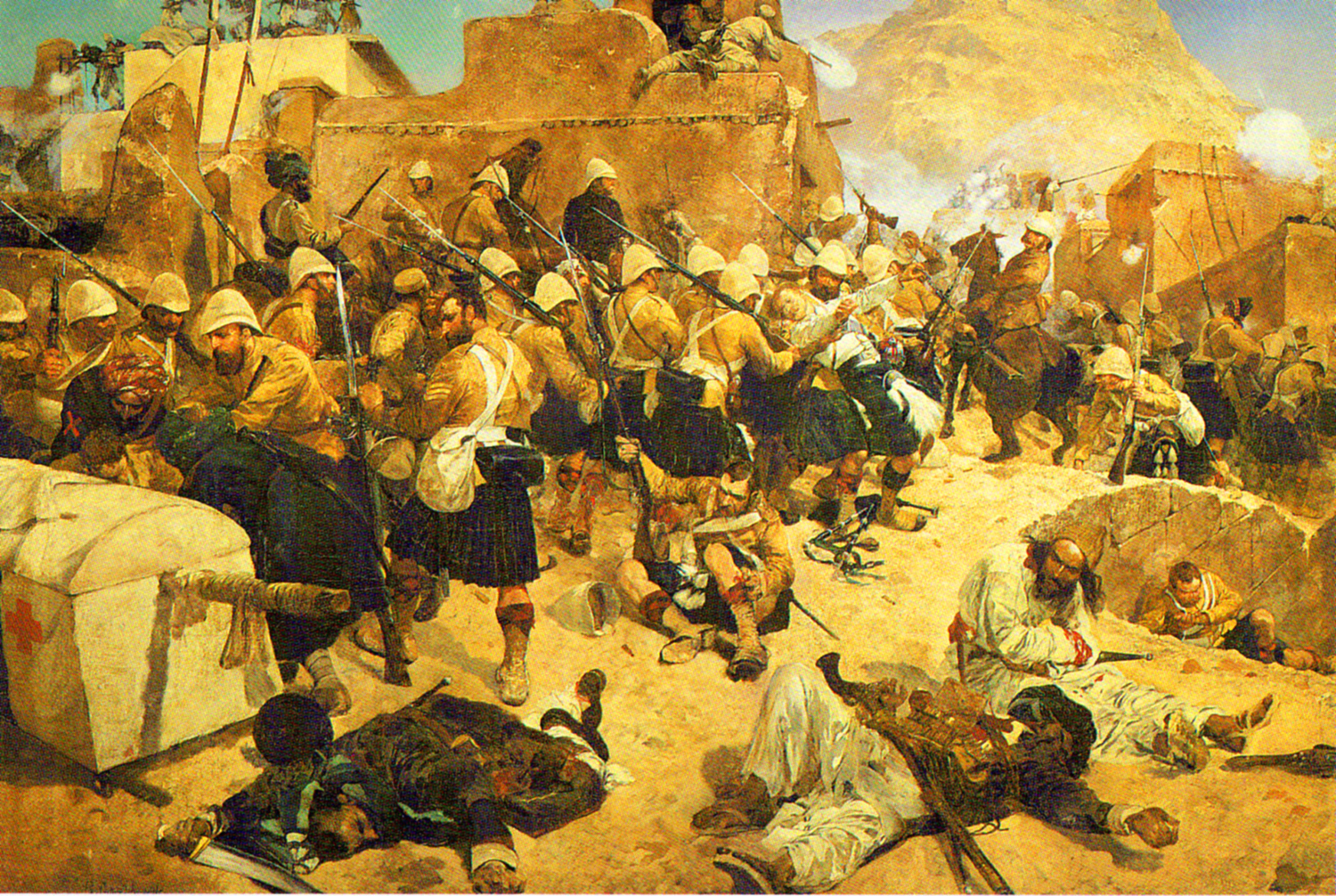
92nd Highlanders at Kandahar. Oil by Richard Caton Woodville.

The Victoria Cross (VC) was awarded to 16 members of the British Armed Forces for action during the Second Afghan War of 1878–1880. The Victoria Cross is a military decoration awarded for valour "in the face of the enemy" to members of the armed forces of some Commonwealth countries and previous British Empire territories. The VC was introduced in Great Britain on 29 January 1856 by Queen Victoria to reward acts of valour during the Crimean War, and takes precedence over all other orders, decorations and medals. It may be awarded to a person of any rank in any service and to civilians under military command. The first ceremony was held on 26 June 1857, when Queen Victoria invested 62 of the 111 Crimean recipients in Hyde Park.

The original Royal Warrant did not contain a specific clause regarding posthumous awards, although official policy was to not award the VC posthumously. Between 1897 and 1901, several notices were issued in the London Gazette regarding soldiers who would have been awarded the VC had they survived. In a partial reversal of policy in 1902, six of the soldiers mentioned were granted the VC, but not "officially" awarded the medal. In 1907, the posthumous policy was completely reversed and medals were sent to the next of kin of the six officers and men. The Victoria Cross warrant was not officially amended to explicitly allow posthumous awards until 1920, but one quarter of all awards for the First World War were posthumous.

In the 19th century, Afghanistan was seen as an important buffer state to the north-west of British-ruled India. In 1866 Sher Ali Khan came to power and was initially well disposed towards Britain. During the next 10 years, relations between the two countries deteriorated, primarily over the issue of Russian encroachment on Afghanistan. In 1878, Sher Ali reluctantly allowed a Russian mission to Kabul, and refused entry to the Viceroy Lord Lytton. After this refusal, Britain sent him an ultimatum that demanded a British envoy be accepted into Afghanistan; when this was ignored, Britain sent in three columns of British troops. The three British columns proceeded over the Bolan Pass to Kandahar, the Khyber Pass to Ali Masjid and through the Kurram Valley to Kabul. After several large victories for the British in 1878, fighting continued in the harsh mountainous terrain through the early months of 1879. As the British marched on Kabul, Sher Ali fled, leaving Yakub Khan to sign the Treaty of Gandamak on 26 May 1879 which required a British envoy in Kabul and the relinquishing of foreign affairs to the British. When the Afghan army mutinied in late 1879, Frederick Roberts, 1st Earl Roberts launched punitive actions and he occupied Kabul on 6 October 1879. After a popular uprising in December, Roberts withdrew to Sherpur where they were besieged for three weeks before launching a major attack on 22–23 December where they returned to Kabul and occupied it once again. Abdur Rahman Khan was instated as Emir in July 1880 but Ayub Khan led a rebel force which defeated the British at the Battle of Maiwand and besieged Kandahar. Roberts led a force from Kabul to Kandahar that defeated the rebels at the Battle of Kandahar on 1 September 1880. British forces withdrew in 1887 after Abdur Khan confirmed the initial Treaty of Gandamak and Britain's control over foreign policy.

== Recipients ==
Name	Unit	Date of action	Place of action
James Adams	Bengal Ecclesiastical Department	11 December 1879	Killa Kazi, Afghanistan
Thomas Ashford	7th Regiment of Foot	16 August 1880	Kandahar, Afghanistan
William Chase	28th Native Infantry	16 August 1880	Kandahar, Afghanistan
James Collis	Royal Horse Artillery	27 July 1880	Maiwand, Afghanistan
John Cook	5th Gurkha Rifles	2 December 1878	Peiwar Kotal, Afghanistan
O'Moore Creagh	Bombay Staff Corps	21 April 1879	Khyber Pass, Afghanistan
William Dick-Cunyngham	92nd Regiment of Foot	13 December 1879	Sherpur Pass, Afghanistan
Walter Hamilton	Corps of Guides	2 April 1879	Futtehabad, Afghanistan
Arthur Hammond	Corps of Guides	14 December 1879	Asmai Heights, Afghanistan
Reginald Hart	Royal Engineers	31 January 1879	Bazar Valley, Afghanistan
Edward Leach	Royal Engineers & Bengal Sappers and Miners	17 March 1879	Khyber Pass, Afghanistan
Patrick Mullane	Royal Horse Artillery	27 July 1880	Maiwand, Afghanistan
Euston Sartorious	59th Regiment of Foot	24 October 1879	Shahjui, Afghanistan
George Sellar	72nd Regiment of Foot	14 December 1879	Asmai Heights, Afghanistan
William Vousden	5th Punjab Cavalry	14 December 1879	Asmai Heights, Afghanistan
George White	92nd Regiment of Foot	6 October 1879	Charasiah, Afghanistan
