= Mount Moorosi =

Mountain in Lesotho

- Moorosi's Mountain
- Location within Lesotho

Highest point
- Coordinates: 30°16′43″S 27°52′20″E

Geography
- Location: Quthing District, Lesotho
- Parent range: Drakensberg

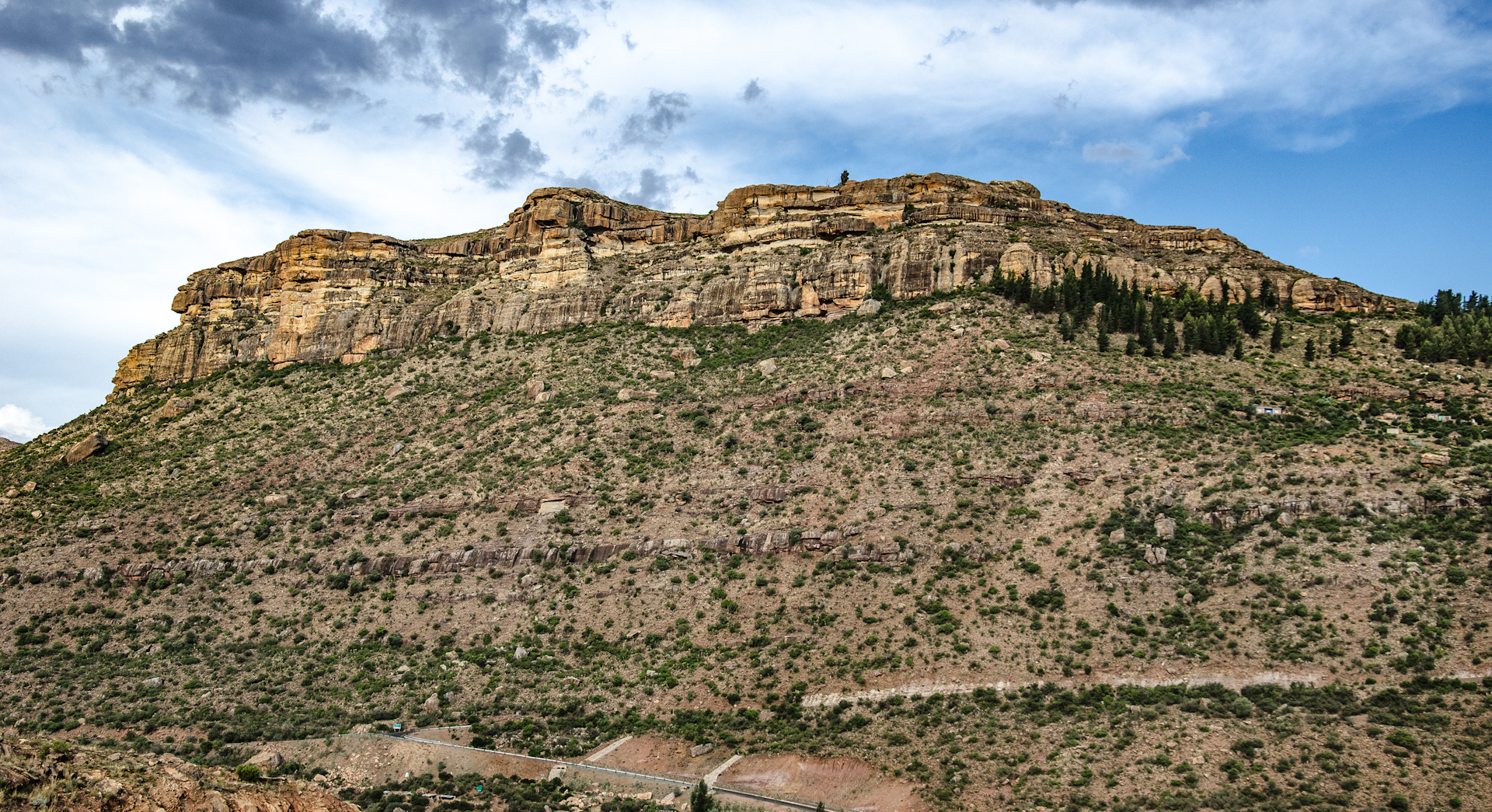
Mount Moorosi (Baphuthi Chief Moorosi's Mountain Fortress)

Mount Moorosi (or Moorosi's Mountain) is a mountain in the Drakensberg mountain range on the banks of the Orange River in southern Lesotho. It acquired the name Moorosi's Mountain after Moorosi, the Chief of a local tribe, who, after committing acts deemed to hostile to the Cape Colonial administration, fortified himself on the mountain. A Royal Engineer who was posted to the mountain after the siege began stated that: "Moorosi's Mountain is an isolated kopje, rising steeply on the south bank of the Orange River, about 1,500 feet, and connected with the range on the south by a low narrow nek."

For actions during the siege three Victoria Crosses were awarded to British troops: Peter Brown, Edmund Hartley and Robert Scott.
