= Cape Colonial Forces =

Defence organisation of the Cape Colony in South Africa

The Cape Colonial Forces (CCF) were the official defence organisation of the Cape Colony in South Africa. Established in 1855, they were taken over by the Union of South Africa in 1910, and disbanded when the Union Defence Forces were formed in 1912.

== 1855–1877 ==
=== The early CCF under representative government ===
The colonial forces were established after Britain granted the Cape Colony "representative government" in 1853. The colony was encouraged to assume some of the responsibility for its own defence, and in 1855 three separate military organisations were formed:

- the para-military Frontier Armed and Mounted Police (FAMP)
- the Burgher Force
- the Volunteer Force

The FAMP was responsible for maintaining law and order in the districts along the frontier with the Xhosa territories in the Transkei. The Burgher Force was a district-based militia, whose units could be mobilised when necessary to maintain order in their home districts. The Volunteer Force was also district-based, but consisted of privately formed and self-financed units which placed their services at the government's disposal.

About three dozen volunteer units were formed between 1855 and 1861. They included:

- the Cape Rifle Corps (later the Duke of Edinburgh's Own Volunteer Rifles) (1855– )
- the Port Elizabeth Rifles (later Prince Alfred's Guard) (1856– )
- the Cape Town Artillery (later Prince Alfred's Own Cape Field Artillery) (1857– )
- the Port Elizabeth Volunteer Artillery (1860–1879)

In 1858, the FAMP was mobilised to restore order in the Transkei, after a wave of cattle-killing and crop-destruction by the Xhosa, following a prophecy that this would make the Whites disappear.

The Volunteer Force collapsed in the early 1860s, during an economic recession which made part-time soldiering unaffordable. By 1867, only a handful of units were left, in Cape Town and Port Elizabeth. Although the economy recovered after diamonds were discovered in Griqualand West in 1869, the Volunteer Force remained dormant.

=== The CCF under responsible government ===
A degree of independence from Britain was achieved in 1872, when the Cape Colony attained "Responsible government" under the leadership of its first Prime Minister, John Molteno.

The new administration encouraged the revival of the local Cape forces, and especially the Volunteer Force. The administration foresaw unrest across the border in the Transkei and, in the case of a war with the Xhosa, it hoped to minimise British Imperial interference by resolving any conflicts locally. The volunteer revival was particularly marked in the eastern districts closest to the frontier, where more than two dozen units were formed between 1875 and 1877. They included the First City of Grahamstown Volunteers (1875– ); and the Buffalo Corps of Rifle Volunteers (later the Kaffrarian Rifles) (1876– ), and Grahamstown Volunteer Horse Artillery (1876–1895). The neighbouring British-ruled province of Griqualand West also raised a small volunteer force.

The Cape Colony Government was also of the opinion that small, highly mobile, mounted commandos, recruited from local people (such as the white farmers, Mfengu and Khoi who lived in the border regions) were best suited to the more irregular warfare in the mountainous frontier. For all but the largest conflicts, such mounted gunmen with their local knowledge were thought preferable to the long, slow and cumbersome columns of British Imperial troops.

== 1877–1881 ==
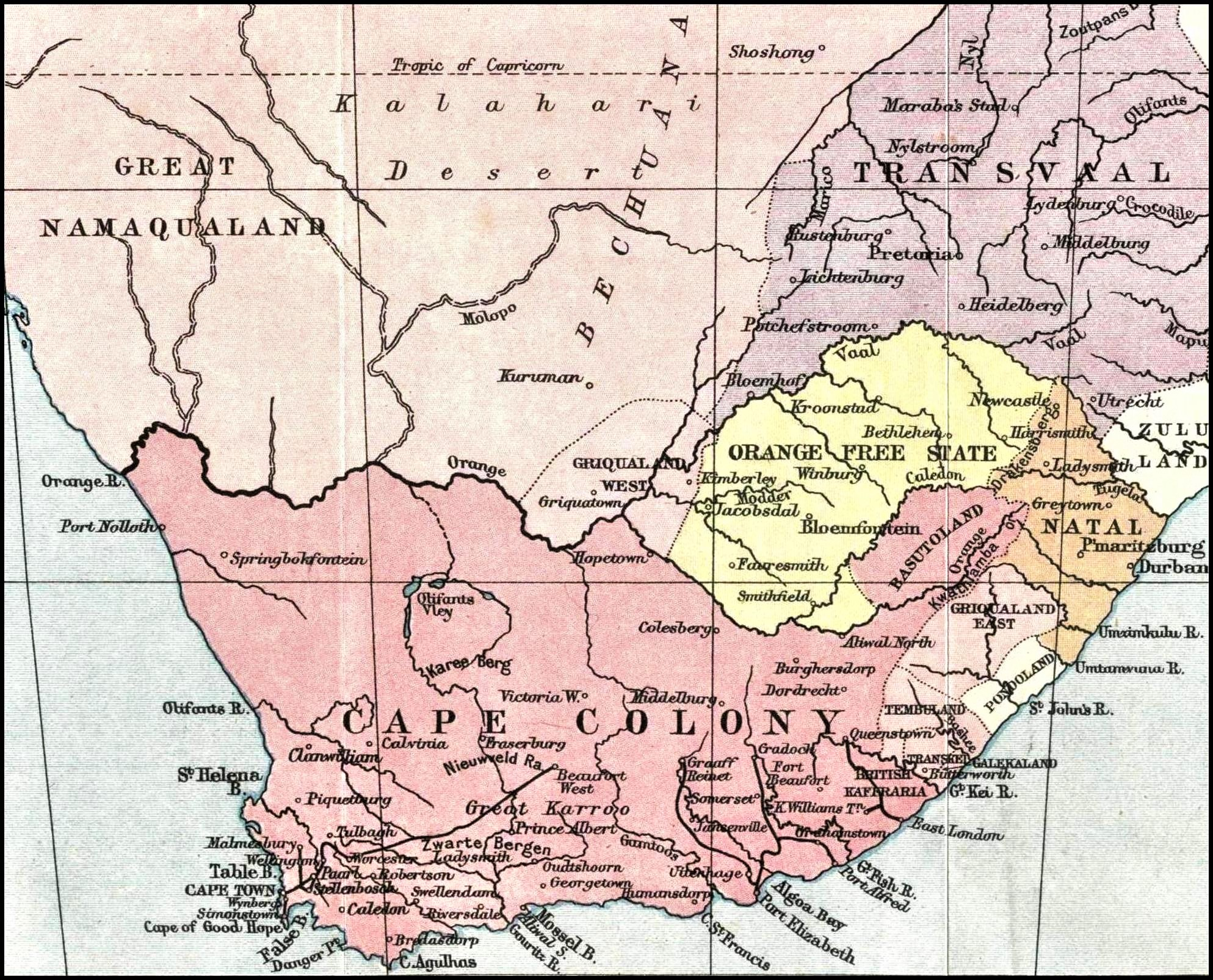
The Cape Colony in 1878.

The Cape forces were deployed in six of the nine wars and campaigns that were fought in South Africa between 1877 and 1881. Dozens of volunteer units were formed, but most disbanded once hostilities were over. Those that continued included the Cape Town Volunteer Engineers (later Cape Garrison Artillery) (1879–1958); and the Griqualand West units that were taken over when that province was annexed to the colony in 1880 and later amalgamated to form the Kimberley Regiment.

The Frontier Armed and Mounted Police, and burgher and volunteer units fought the Xhosa in the Transkei and the Ciskei in the 9th Frontier War (1877–1878).

After the war, in 1878, the government organised the military forces into a single organisation, under a Defence Department headed by a commandant-general. The first two commandants-general were Col Samuel Jarvis (1878–1880) and Brig Gen Charles Mansfield Clarke (1880–1881).

The FAMP were fully militarised and renamed the Cape Mounted Riflemen (CMR), with the Cape Mounted Yeomanry as an auxiliary. Legislation authorised the government to call up the burgher and volunteer forces for service outside their home districts. Collectively, the CMR, the CMY, the burghers, and the volunteers, were referred to as the "Colonial Forces".

In the Northern Border Rebellion (1878), Colonial Forces were deployed against the Koranna in the districts along the Orange River.

While British regiments were away in Zululand during the Anglo-Zulu War (1879), volunteer units were called up to man the garrisons in the Transkei and elsewhere.

In the Basuto Gun War (1880–1881), Colonial Forces units were deployed in Basutoland, which was under Cape administration at that time, to enforce a law which prohibited the Basuto from owning firearms.

In the concurrent Transkei Campaign, Colonial Forces were deployed against the Mpondomise in the Transkei.

== 1882–1899 ==
Under government direction, the Colonial Forces grew and became more professional during the 1880s and 1890s. Maj Gen Charles 'Chinese' Gordon was briefly commandant-general in 1882. He was succeeded by Col Zachary Bayly (1882–1892).

Compulsory registration of men for the Burgher Force ended in 1884, effectively disbanding the force.

Fears of a British war with Russia stimulated the formation of more than a dozen volunteer units, including the Cape Town Highlanders (1885– )and the Cape Town Irish Volunteer Rifles (1885–1891), the Kimberley Volunteers (1887–1890), the Volunteer Medical Staff Corps (later Cape Medical Corps) (1889– ), the Uitenhage Volunteer Rifles (1892–1913), and several small units in country towns. The Cape Town coast defences were upgraded, and the Cape Town Volunteer Engineers converted into the Cape Garrison Artillery. In 1893, the small country units were grouped together as the Western Rifles.

Command of the Colonial Forces was divided in 1892, between a Colonial Military Secretary (Col Philip Homan-ffoliiott) who controlled the CMR and the headquarters staffs, and a Commandant of Volunteers (Col Richard Southey), in charge of the part-time forces.

In 1896, the volunteer units in Griqualand West were formed into the Griqualand West Brigade, and the field and garrison artillery were combined to form the Cape Artillery.

In 1897, the Colonial Forces were deployed in the Bechuanaland Campaign in the northern Cape, to apprehend three fugitive Tswana chiefs.

== 1899–1902 ==
From 1899 to 1902, South Africa was ravaged by a war between the British Empire – including the Cape Colony and Natal – and the Boer republics in the Orange Free State and Transvaal. Boer forces invaded the Cape in 1899 and besieged Mafeking and Kimberley. The Cape government mobilised the Colonial Forces to guard railways and other lines of communication, while the British Army struggled to relieve the besieged towns. Later, units were assigned to British formations in the field, and one was detailed to escort Boer prisoners of war to Saint Helena and Ceylon.

For a few months in 1900, a Colonial Division, consisting of the Cape Mounted Riflemen and several volunteer units under Brig Gen Edward Brabant, served with the British forces in the Orange Free State.

In January 1901, after a second Boer incursion, the government formed the Colonial Defence Force (CDF), under Brig Gen Brabant. It consisted of dozens of town guards and district mounted troops, for local defence, and a few mobile units, which were placed under British Army command. In December 1901, the CDF was merged with the Colonial Forces, which were renamed the Cape Colonial Forces (CCF).

The war ended in British victory in 1902.

== 1903–1913 ==
From 1903, the Cape Colonial Forces consisted of the Defence Department under a commandant-general, the Cape Mounted Riflemen, and the Volunteer Force. The post-war commandants-general were Maj Gen Sir Edward Brabant (1903–1904) and Col Henry Lukin (1904–1912).

Most of the pre-war volunteer units continued, but none of the wartime units was retained. A few new units were formed, including the Cape Peninsula Rifles (1903–1926), and the Cape Naval Volunteers (1905–2005).

King Edward VII recognised the CCF's wartime service by granting its units King's Colours in 1904.

Imperial Germany became the new threat to British interests, and the CMR was mobilised in 1906 to help the Cape Mounted Police fight off the 'Ferreira Raid', a small armed incursion from German South-West Africa. In 1907, a defence plan was prepared in case of a full-scale German invasion.

When the Cape Colony became a province of the new Union of South Africa in 1910, the CCF were placed under the new defence ministry in Pretoria. They were disbanded when the Union Defence Forces (UDF) were formed in 1912, and in 1913 most of the CCF units were incorporated into the UDF. The remainder were disbanded.

== See also ==
- Cape Mounted Riflemen
