= Cape Mounted Riflemen =

South African military units

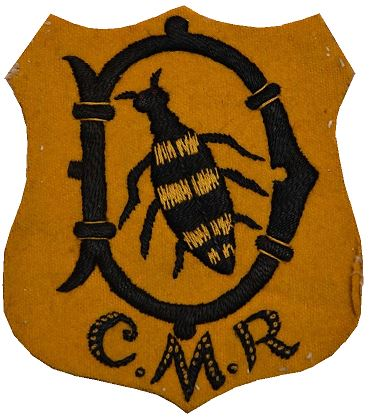
- Cape Mounted Riflemen patch with a CMR blisterbeetle (Hycleus oculatus) in the centre
- Active: 1793 - 1926
- Allegiance: Union of South Africa; (United Kingdom) British Empire
- Branch: South African Army British Army
- Garrison/HQ: Simon's Town
- Engagements: Cape Frontier Wars; Moorosi Campaign; Basutoland Gun War; Matabeleland Campaign; Bechuanaland Campaign; Second Boer War; World War I; Rand Revolt

The Cape Mounted Riflemen were South African military units.

There were two separate successive regiments of that name. To distinguish them, some military historians describe the first as the "imperial" Cape Mounted Riflemen (originally the "Cape Regiment"), and the second as the "colonial" Cape Mounted Riflemen.

== Cape Mounted Riflemen (1) ==
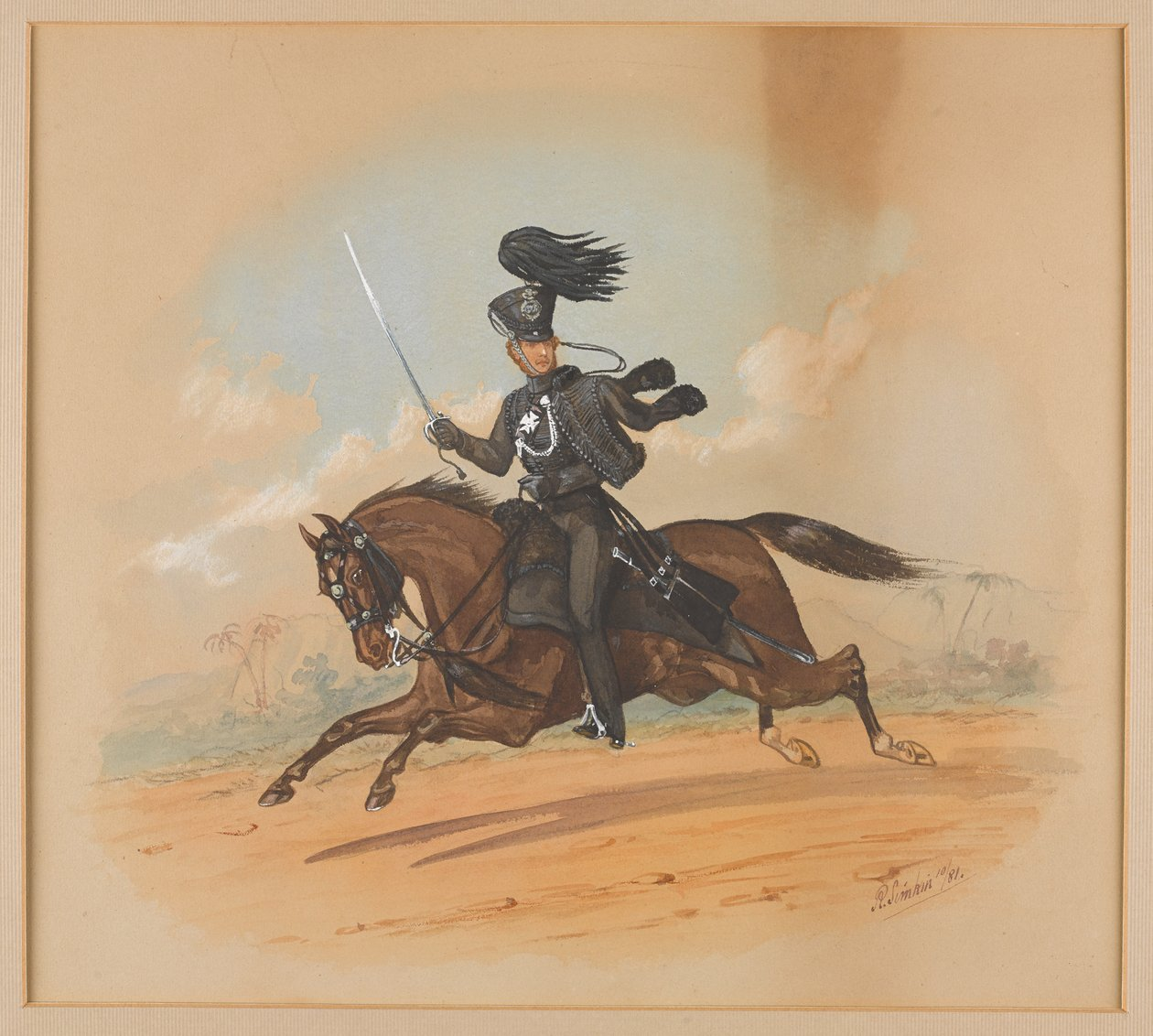
Portrait of a regimental lieutenant colonel

The first, so-called "imperial", unit, was formed by the Dutch administration of the Cape Colony in 1793, to enlarge its garrison because of the threat posed by the war in Europe. It was known as the Pandour Corps, and consisted of Khoisan and Coloured men under White officers.

=== Cape Regiment (1795–1827) ===
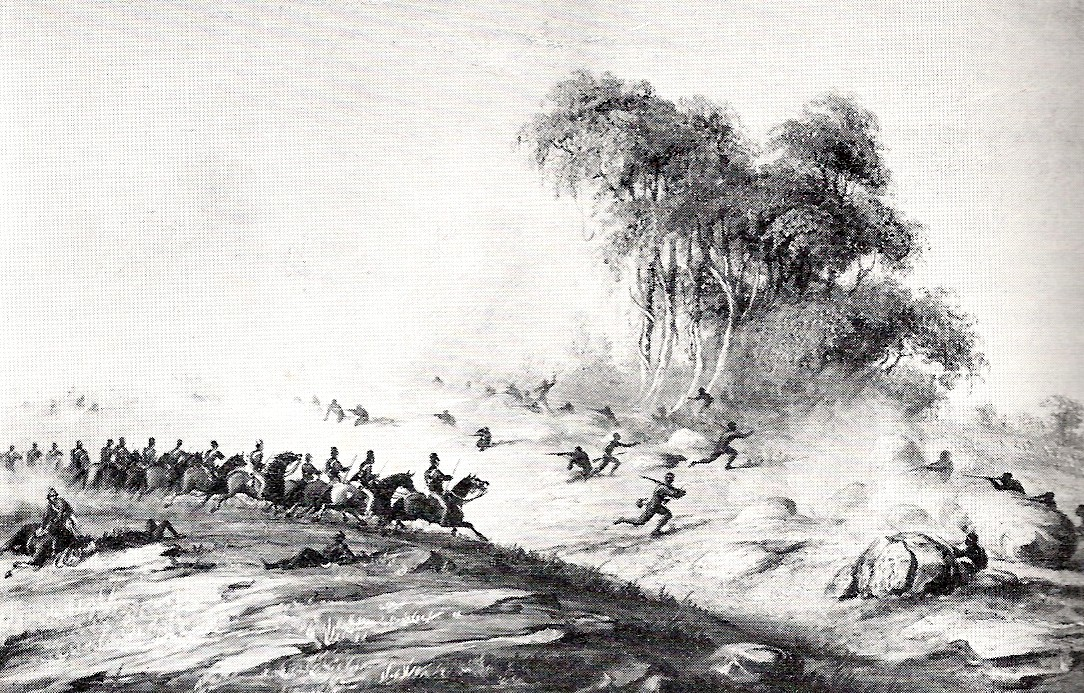
The regiment charging Xhosa warriors at Waterkloof on 14 October 1851 during the Eighth Xhosa War

The British retained the unit after taking over the colony in 1795, and renamed it the Cape Regiment. When the Dutch resumed the administration in 1803, they changed the name to the Corps van Vrye Hottentotten, i.e. "Corps of Free Hottentots" and again, in 1805, to the Hottentot Ligte Infanterie, i.e. "Hottentot Light Infantry". After British rule was reinstated in 1806, the unit was called the Cape Regiment again. The regiment had its headquarters at Simonstown and formed a key component of the Cape's frontier defences, repeatedly distinguishing itself in the early frontier wars. In 1817, it was divided into mounted and infantry sections, and was renamed the Cape Corps of Cavalry and Infantry, or "Cape Corps" for short.

=== Cape Mounted Riflemen (1827–1870) ===
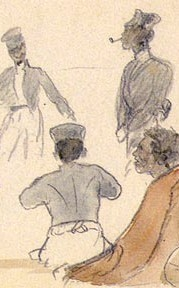
1850 illustration of off-duty regimental soldiers

In 1827, the infantry section was disbanded, leaving only the mixed-race cavalry unit. The resulting exclusively mounted corps was renamed Cape Mounted Riflemen. The unit was deployed in several operations and campaigns: the 4th, 5th, 6th, 7th, and 8th Cape Frontier Wars, the siege of Durban (1842), and the Basuto War. The CMR were disbanded in 1870. In 1915 the earlier name, "Cape Corps", was revived for a unit of Coloured soldiers. The name Cape Regiment was revived for another Coloured unit, in 1986.

== Cape Mounted Riflemen (2) ==
The Cape Colony government founded the second, so-called "colonial", in 1855, as the para-military Frontier Armed and Mounted Police (FAMP).

=== Frontier Armed and Mounted Police (1855–78) ===
The function of this locally recruited multiracial force was to maintain law and order in the districts along the colony's frontier with the Xhosa kingdoms in the Transkei. A new constitution that prohibited discrimination on the basis of race and instituted the non-racial Cape Qualified Franchise partially assuaged some of the Xhosa people's grievances, leading to a period of relative peace on the frontier. Nevertheless, conflicts did erupt over the following decades, and the FAMP played a central role in policing them.

The FAMP was operationally deployed in the Transkei in 1858, against the Koranna in 1869, in apprehending the Zulu chief Langalibalele in 1873, in Griqualand West in 1875, and in the 9th Frontier War (1877–1878).

When the Cape attained "Responsible Government" in 1872, its new prime minister, John Molteno, shifted the focus of government policy to internal development, rather than territorial expansion. Nonetheless, his government expanded the FAMP, whose efficiency and military capacity Molteno had a very high opinion of. The new government was also of the opinion that a competent FAMP force would remove the need for any outside British intervention in the region.

Consequently, by 1876, the FAMP had grown to have units stationed at Komga, Queenstown, Palmietfontein, King Williams Town, Peddie, Butterworth, Kenhardt, Fort Murray, Ealing Post and Kokstad. An artillery unit was added in 1874. The FAMP were also re-organised for rapid mobility; lightly equipped and possessing considerable local knowledge, they formed a very effective police force for the rough and mountainous frontier terrain.

=== Cape Mounted Riflemen (1878–1913) ===
Finally in 1878, the FAMP were fully militarised, as a unit of the Colonial Forces, and renamed Cape Mounted Riflemen.

A change in the Cape Government in 1878, and the new Sprigg Government's expansionist policies, led to outbreaks of conflict, both within the Cape Colony, and around its borders. These conflicts were part of a wider surge of warfare across southern Africa, stemming from the attempt by the London Colonial Office to enforce a system of British-controlled Confederation onto the region. The CMR were involved in several of the more local conflicts, which directly involved the Cape Colony.

In 1879, the CMR fought in the Moorosi campaign, where they gained much distinction. They also fought in the Basutoland Gun War (1880–1881), the Matabeleland campaign (1893–1894), the Bechuanaland campaign in 1897, and the Second Boer War (1899–1902). During these wars, the CMR came to comprise the dominant portion of the whole of the Cape Forces. As before, during peacetime the CMR served as a police force.

== Union Defence Force ==
=== 1st South African Mounted Riflemen (1913–26) ===
In 1913, the CMR were incorporated into the new Union Defence Force as the 1st South African Mounted Riflemen. In World War I they fought in the German South-West Africa campaign (1914–1915). In 1922, they were deployed in operations to crush the Rand Revolt on the Witwatersrand.

The 1st SAMR were disbanded in 1926, for financial reasons.

== Legacy ==
The CMR blisterbeetle (Hycleus oculatus) is named after the Cape Mounted Riflemen.

== See also ==
- Cape Colonial Forces
