= List of Victoria Cross recipients of the Indian Army =

The Victoria Cross

The Victoria Cross (VC) was awarded to 153 members of the British Indian Army and civilians under its command, from 1857 until independence in 1947. The Victoria Cross is a military decoration awarded for valour "in the face of the enemy" to members of armed forces of some Commonwealth countries and previous British Empire territories. It takes precedence over all other Orders, decorations and medals. It may be awarded to a person of any rank in any service and to civilians under military command. The VC is traditionally presented to the recipient by the British monarch during an investiture at Buckingham Palace, though in a large number of cases this was not possible and it was presented in the field by a prominent civil or military official. The VC was introduced in Great Britain on 29 January 1856 by Queen Victoria to reward acts of valour during the Crimean War.

Indian troops were not originally eligible for the VC, because since 1837 they had been eligible for the Indian Order of Merit—the oldest British gallantry award for general issue. When the VC was created, Indian troops were still controlled by the British East India Company, and did not come under Crown control until 1860. European officers and men serving with the East India Company were not eligible for the Indian Order of Merit; the VC was extended to cover them in October 1857. It was only at the end of the 19th century that calls for Indian troops to be awarded the VC intensified. Indian troops became eligible for the award in 1911. The first awards to Indian troops appeared in The London Gazette on 7 December 1914 to Darwan Singh Negi and Khudadad Khan, whose gallantry on 31 October 1914 was nearly a month earlier than Negi's gallantry on 24/25 November. Negi was presented with the VC by King George V two days earlier, on 5 December 1914, during a visit to troops in France. He is one of a small number of soldiers presented with his award before it appeared in the London Gazette.

There have been a total of 148 VC recipients who were serving with an Indian Army or Honourable East India Company (HEIC) unit. 63 VCs were awarded to British officers and men of the HEIC during the Anglo-Persian War (1856–1857) and the Indian Rebellion of 1857. 33 VCs were awarded for action in various campaigns between the rebellion in 1857 and the First World War. 18 VCs were awarded for action in the First World War, and 30 in the Second World War. In addition to these, 5 civilians under military command were awarded the VC.

== Recipients ==
This along with the *, indicates that the Victoria Cross was awarded posthumously.

Name	Unit	Date of action	Conflict	Place of action
James Adams	Bengal Ecclesiastical Department	1879	Second Anglo-Afghan War	Killa Kazi, Afghanistan
Robert Adams	Corps of Guides	1897	Tirah Campaign	Nawa Kili, India
Frederick Aikman	4th Bengal Native Infantry	1858	Indian Rebellion of 1857	Amethi, India
Robert Aitken	13th Bengal Native Infantry	1857	Indian Rebellion of 1857	Lucknow, India
Michael Allmand	Indian Armoured Corps	1944*	Second World War	Pin Hmi Road Bridge, Burma
Henry Andrews	Indian Medical Service	1919*	Waziristan campaign (1919–1920)	Waziristan, India
Charles Baker	Bengal Police Battalion	1858	Indian Rebellion of 1857	Suhejnee, Bengal
Premindra Bhagat	Royal Bombay Sappers and Miners	1941	Second World War	Metemma, Abyssinia
James Blair	2nd Bombay Light Cavalry	1857	Indian Rebellion of 1857	Neemuch, India
Guy Boisragon	Indian Staff Corps	1891	Hunza-Naga Campaign	Nilt Fort, India
Francis Brown	1st European Bengal Fusiliers	1857	Indian Rebellion of 1857	Narnoul, India
Sam Browne	46th Bengal Native Infantry	1858	Indian Rebellion of 1857	Seerporah, India
William Bruce	59th Scinde Rifles	1914*	First World War	Givenchy, France
John Buckley	Commissariat Department	1857	Indian Rebellion of 1857	Delhi, India
Thomas Butler	1st European Bengal Fusiliers	1857	Indian Rebellion of 1857	Lucknow, India
Thomas Cadell	2nd European Bengal Fusiliers	1857	Indian Rebellion of 1857	Delhi, India
William Cafe	56th Bengal Native Infantry	1858	Indian Rebellion of 1857	Fort Ruhya, India
Herbert Carter	Poona Mounted Infantry	1903	Fourth Somaliland Expedition	Jidballi, Somaliland
George Channer	Bengal Staff Corps	1875	Perak War	Perak, Malaya
William Chase	28th Bombay Native Infantry	1880	Second Anglo-Afghan War	Kandahar, Afghanistan
George Chicken	Indian Naval Brigade	1858	Indian Rebellion of 1857	Peroo, Bengal
Herbert Clogstoun	19th Madras Native Infantry	1859	Indian Rebellion of 1857	Chichumbah, India
Alexander Cobbe	King's African Rifles	1902	Third Somaliland Expedition	Erigo, Somaliland
William Connolly	Bengal Horse Artillery	1857	Indian Rebellion of 1857	Jhelum, India
John Cook	Bengal Staff Corps	1878	Second Anglo-Afghan War	Peiwar Kotal, Afghanistan
Edmond Costello	22nd Punjab Infantry	1897	Tirah Campaign	Malakand, India
Garrett Creagh	Bombay Staff Corps	1879	Second Anglo-Afghan War	Kam Dakka, Afghanistan
John Crimmin	Bombay Medical Service	1889	Third Burmese War	Lwekaw, Burma
William Cubitt	13th Bengal Native Infantry	1857	Indian Rebellion of 1857	Chinhut, India
Arthur Cumming	12th Frontier Force Regiment	1942	Second World War	Kuantan, Malaya
Mir Dast	55th Coke's Rifles (Frontier Force)	1915	First World War	Wieltje, Belgium
John Daunt	11th Bengal Native Infantry	1857	Indian Rebellion of 1857	Chota Behar, India
Frank de Pass	34th Prince Albert Victor's Own Poona Horse	1914*	First World War	Festubert, France
Bernard Diamond	Bengal Horse Artillery	1857	Indian Rebellion of 1857	Bolandshahr, India
Fazal Din	10th Baluch Regiment	1945*	Second World War	Meiktila, Burma
Thomas Duffy	1st Madras European Fusiliers	1857	Indian Rebellion of 1857	Lucknow, India
James Dundas	Bengal Engineers	1865	Bhutan War	Dewan-Giri, India
Richard Fitzgerald	Bengal Horse Artillery	1857	Indian Rebellion of 1857	Bolandshahr, India
Andrew Fitzgibbon	India Medical Establishment	1860	Third China War	Taku Forts, China
George Forrest	Bengal Veterans Establishment	1857	Indian Rebellion of 1857	Delhi, India
George Fosbery	4th Bengal European Regiment	1863	Waziristan campaign (1919–1920)	North-West Frontier, India
Yeshwant Ghadge	5th Mahratta Light Infantry	1944*	Second World War	Upper Tiber Valley, Italy
Gaje Ghale	5th Gurkha Rifles	1943	Second World War	Chin Hills, Burma
Peter Gill	Loodiana Regiment	1857	Indian Rebellion of 1857	Benares, India
Charles Goodfellow	Bombay Engineers	1859	Indian Rebellion of 1857	Kathiawar, India
Hugh Gough	1st Bengal European Light Cavalry	1857	Indian Rebellion of 1857	Alumbagh, India
Charles Gough	5th Bengal European Cavalry	1857	Indian Rebellion of 1857	Khurkowdah, India
Charles Grant	Indian Staff Corps	1891	Manipur Expedition	Thobal, Burma
John Grant	8th Gurkha Rifles	1904	British expedition to Tibet	Gyantse Jong, Tibet
Bhanbhagta Gurung	2nd Gurkha Rifles	1945	Second World War	Snowdon East, Tamandu, Burma
Lachhiman Gurung	8th Gurkha Rifles	1945	Second World War	Taungdaw, Burma
Thaman Gurung	5th Gurkha Rifles	1944*	Second World War	Monte San Bartolo, Italy
Ali Haidar	13th Frontier Force Rifles	1945	Second World War	Fusignano, Italy
Rao Abdul Hafiz Khan	9th Jat Infantry	1944*	Second World War	Imphal, India
Walter Hamilton	Corps of Guides	1879	Second Anglo-Afghan War	Futtehabad, Afghanistan
Arthur Hammond	Bengal Staff Corps	1879	Second Anglo-Afghan War	Kabul, Afghanistan
Hastings Harington	Bengal Horse Artillery	1857	Indian Rebellion of 1857	Lucknow, India
James Hills	Bengal Horse Artillery	1857	Indian Rebellion of 1857	Delhi, India
Duncan Home	Bengal Engineers	1857	Indian Rebellion of 1857	Delhi, India
Eustace Jotham	51st Sikhs	1915*	First World War	Tochi Valley, India
James Innes	Bengal Engineers	1858	Indian Rebellion of 1857	Sultanpore, India
Namdeo Jadhav	5th Mahratta Light Infantry	1945	Second World War	Senio River, Italy
Hanson Jarrett	26th Bengal Native Infantry	1858	Indian Rebellion of 1857	Baroun, India
Edward Jennings	Bengal Horse Artillery	1857	Indian Rebellion of 1857	Lucknow, India
Karamjeet Judge	15th Punjab Regiment	1945*	Second World War	Meiktila, Burma
Thomas Kavanagh	Bengal Civil Service	1857	Indian Rebellion of 1857	Lucknow, India
Richard Keatinge	Bombay Artillery	1858	Indian Rebellion of 1857	Chundairee, India
William Kenny	39th Garhwal Rifles	1920	Waziristan campaign (1919–1920)	Kot Kai, India
William Kerr	24th Bombay Native Infantry	1857	Indian Rebellion of 1857	Kolapore, India
Khudadad Khan	129th Duke of Connaught's Own Baluchis	1914	First World War	Hollebeke, France
Shahamad Khan	89th Punjabis	1916	First World War	Beit Ayeesa, Mesopotamia
Lala	41st Dogras	1916	First World War	El Orah, Mesopotamia
Ganju Lama	7th Gurkha Rifles	1944	Second World War	Ningthoukhong, Burma
Thomas Laughnan	Bengal Horse Artillery	1857	Indian Rebellion of 1857	Lucknow, India
Harry Lyster	72nd Bengal Native Infantry	1858	Indian Rebellion of 1857	Calpee, India
Donald Macintyre	Bengal Staff Corps	1872	Looshai Expedition	Lalgnoora, India
Hector MacLean	Corps of Guides	1897*	Tirah Campaign	Nawa Kili, India
Patrick Mahoney	1st Madras European Fusiliers	1857	Indian Rebellion of 1857	Mungulwar, India
John Malcolmson	3rd Bombay Light Cavalry	1857	Anglo-Persian War	Khoosh-ab, Persia
Ross Mangles	Bengal Civil Service	1857	Indian Rebellion of 1857	Arrah, India
Arthur Mayo	Indian Naval Brigade	1857	Indian Rebellion of 1857	Arrah, India
Francis Maxwell	Indian Staff Corps	1900	Second Boer War	Korn Spruit, South Africa
William McDonell	Bengal Civil Service	1857	Indian Rebellion of 1857	Arrah, India
Hugh McInnes	Bengal Horse Artillery	1857	Indian Rebellion of 1857	Lucknow, India
John McGovern	1st Bengal Fusiliers	1857	Indian Rebellion of 1857	Delhi, India
James McGuire	1st Bengal Fusiliers	1857	Indian Rebellion of 1857	Delhi, India
Charles Melliss	Indian Staff Corps	1900	Third Ashanti Expedition	Obassa, Ashanti
Godfrey Meynell	12th Frontier Force Regiment	1935*	Second Mohmand Campaign	Mohmand, India
James Miller	Bengal Ordnance Depot	1857	Indian Rebellion of 1857	Futtehpore, India
Arthur Moore	3rd Bombay Light Cavalry	1857	Anglo-Persian War	Khoosh-ab, Persia
Darwan Negi	39th Garhwal Rifles	1914	First World War	Festubert, France
Gabbar Negi	39th Garhwal Rifles	1915*	First World War	Neuve Chapelle, France
William Olpherts	Bengal Horse Artillery	1857	Indian Rebellion of 1857	Lucknow, India
James Park	Bengal Horse Artillery	1857	Indian Rebellion of 1857	Lucknow, India
Everard Phillipps	11th Bengal Native Infantry	1857*	Indian Rebellion of 1857	Delhi, India
Henry Pitcher	4th Punjab Infantry	1863	Waziristan campaign (1919–1920)	North-West Frontier, India
Harry Prendergast	Madras Engineers	1857	Indian Rebellion of 1857	Mundisore, India
Dighton Probyn	2nd Punjab Cavalry	1857	Indian Rebellion of 1857	India
Tulbahadur Pun	6th Gurkha Rifles	1944	Second World War	Mogaung, Burma
Agansing Rai	5th Gurkha Rifles	1944	Second World War	Bishenpur, Burma
Bhandari Ram	10th Baluch Regiment	1944	Second World War	Arakan, Burma
Chhelu Ram	6th Rajputana Rifles	1943*	Second World War	Djebel Garci, Tunisia
Kamal Ram	8th Punjab Regiment	1944	Second World War	Gari River, Italy
Richhpal Ram	6th Rajputana Rifles	1941*	Second World War	Keren, Eritrea
Karanbahadur Rana	3rd Queen Alexandra's Own Gurkha Rifles	1918	First World War	El Kefr, Egypt
William Raynor	Bengal Veterans Establishment	1857	Indian Rebellion of 1857	Delhi, India
George Renny	Bengal Horse Artillery	1857	Indian Rebellion of 1857	Delhi, India
Richard Ridgeway	Bengal Staff Corps	1879	Basuto War	Konoma, India
Frederick Roberts	Bengal Horse Artillery	1858	Indian Rebellion of 1857	Khodagunge, India
Patrick Roddy	Bengal Army	1858	Indian Rebellion of 1857	Kuthirga, India
George Rolland	1st Bombay Grenadiers	1903	Third Somaliland Expedition	Daratoleh, Somaliland
Matthew Rosamund	37th Bengal Native Infantry	1857	Indian Rebellion of 1857	Benares, India
John Ryan	1st Madras European Fusiliers	1857	Indian Rebellion of 1857	Lucknow, India
Miles Ryan	101st Regiment of Foot (Royal Bengal Fusiliers)	1857	Indian Rebellion of 1857	Delhi, India
Philip Salkeld	Bengal Engineers	1857	Indian Rebellion of 1857	Delhi, India
Reginald Sartorius	6th Bengal Cavalry	1874	First Ashanti Expedition	Abogu, Ashanti
Andrew Scott	Bengal Staff Corps	1877	Balochistan Campaign	Quetta, India
Sher Shah	16th Punjab Regiment	1945*	Second World War	Kyeyebyin, Burma
Badlu Singh	14th Murray's Jat Lancers	1918*	First World War	River Jordan, Palestine
Chatta Singh	9th Bhopal Infantry	1916	First World War	Wadi, Mesopotamia
Gian Singh	15th Punjab Regiment	1945	Second World War	Kamye, Burma
Gobind Singh	28th Light Cavalry	1917	First World War	Épehy, France
Ishar Singh	28th Punjab Regiment	1921	Waziristan campaign (1919–1920)	Haidari Kach, India
Nand Singh	11th Sikh Regiment	1944	Second World War	Maungdaw-Buthidaung Road, Burma
Parkash Singh	8th Punjab Regiment	1943	Second World War	Donbaik, Burma
Prakash Singh	13th Frontier Force Rifles	1945*	Second World War	Kanlan Ywathit, Burma
Ram Sarup Singh	1st Punjab Regiment	1944*	Second World War	Kennedy Peak, Burma
Umrao Singh	Royal Indian Artillery	1944	Second World War	Kaladan Valley, Burma
John Sinton	Indian Medical Service	1916	First World War	Orah Ruins, Mesopotamia
Robert Shebbeare	60th Bengal Native Infantry	1857	Indian Rebellion of 1857	Delhi, India
John Smith	Bengal Sappers and Miners	1857	Indian Rebellion of 1857	Delhi, India
John Smith	1st Madras European Fusiliers	1857	Indian Rebellion of 1857	Lucknow, India
John Smith	Indian Staff Corps	1891	Hunza-Naga Campaign	Nilt Fort, India
John Smyth	15th Ludhiana Sikhs	1915	First World War	Richebourg L'Aouve, France
Edward Thackeray	Bengal Engineers	1857	Indian Rebellion of 1857	Delhi, India
Kulbir Thapa	3rd Queen Alexandra's Own Gurkha Rifles	1915	First World War	Fauquissart, France
Lalbahadur Thapa	2nd Gurkha Rifles	1943	Second World War	Rass-es-Zouai, Tunisia
Netrabahadur Thapa	5th Gurkha Rifles	1944*	Second World War	Bishenpur, Burma
Sher Bahadur Thapa	9th Gurkha Rifles	1944*	Second World War	San Marino, Italy
Jacob Thomas	Bengal Horse Artillery	1857	Indian Rebellion of 1857	Lucknow, India
Henry Tombs	Bengal Horse Artillery	1857	Indian of 1857	Delhi, India
James Travers	2nd Bengal Native Infantry	1857	Indian Rebellion of 1857	Indore, India
William Trevor	Bengal Engineers	1865	Bhutan War	Dewan-Giri, India
John Tytler	66th Bengal Native Infantry	1858	Indian Rebellion of 1857	Choorpoorah, India
William Vousden	5th Punjab Cavalry	1879	Second Anglo-Afghan War	Kabul, Afghanistan
William Walker	4th Gurkha Rifles	1903	Third Somaliland Expedition	Daratoleh, Somaliland
William Waller	25th Bombay Light Infantry	1858	Indian Rebellion of 1857	Gwalior, India
John Watson	1st Punjab Cavalry	1857	Indian Rebellion of 1857	Lucknow, India
George Wheeler	9th Gurkha Rifles	1917	First World War	Shumran, Mesopotamia
George Wheeler	7th Hariana Lancers	1915*	First World War	Shaiba, Mesopotamia
Frederick Whirlpool	3rd Bombay European Regiment	1857	Indian Rebellion of 1857	Jhansi, India
Harry Whitchurch	Indian Medical Service	1895	Chitral Expedition	Chitral Fort, India
John Wood	20th Bombay Native Infantry	1856	Anglo-Persian War	Bushire, Persia
