= List of Brigade of Gurkhas recipients of the Victoria Cross =

The Victoria Cross

The Victoria Cross (VC) is a military decoration bestowed on members of the British or Commonwealth armed forces for acts of valour or gallantry performed in the face of the enemy. In the British honours system and those of many Commonwealth nations it is the highest award a soldier can receive for actions in combat. It was established in 1856 and since then has been awarded 1,356 times, including to three recipients who were awarded the VC twice.

The British Army's Brigade of Gurkhas, units composed of Nepalese soldiers—although originally led by British officers—has been a part of the army since 1815. When raised, it originally focused on conflicts in the Far East, but the transfer of Hong Kong from British to Chinese hands necessitated that the brigade move its base to the UK. A battalion is still maintained in Brunei and as at 2016, units serve in Afghanistan.

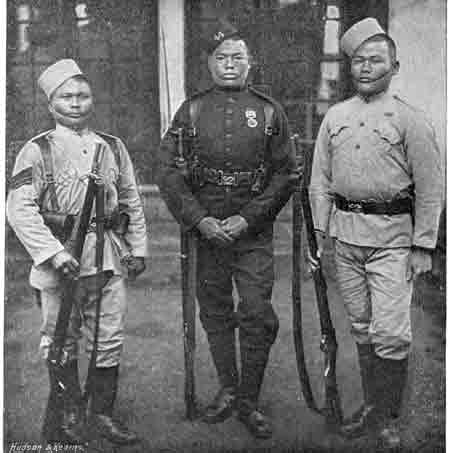
Gurkha Soldiers (1896)

Since the VC was introduced it has been awarded to Gurkhas or British officers serving with Gurkha regiments 26 times. The first award was made in 1858 to a British officer of the Gurkhas, John Tytler, during the campaigns that followed the Indian Rebellion of 1857. The first award to a native Gurkha, Kulbir Thapa, was in 1915 during the First World War. When the Victoria Cross was initially established, Gurkhas, along with all other native troops of the British East India Company Army or the British Indian Army, were not eligible for the decoration and as such, until 1911, all of the Gurkha recipients of the award were British officers who were attached to Gurkha regiments. Until that time the highest award that Gurkhas were eligible for was the Indian Order of Merit. Since 1911 however, of the 16 VCs awarded to men serving with Gurkha regiments, 13 have been bestowed on native Gurkhas. The most recent award was made in 1965 to Rambahadur Limbu, during the Indonesia–Malaysia confrontation. Along with the Royal Green Jackets, the Gurkha regiments are among the most heavily decorated Commonwealth units.

In 1950, when India became a republic, Gurkhas serving in the Gurkha regiments of the Indian Army lost their eligibility for the Victoria Cross and they are now covered under the Indian honours system. Under this system the Param Vir Chakra (PVC), which is India's highest military decoration for valour, is considered to be equivalent to the Victoria Cross. As such only those serving in the Gurkha units of the British Army remain eligible for the Victoria Cross.

Two George Cross (GC) medals have been awarded to Gurkha soldiers for acts of bravery displayed not in combat. The GC is the highest award bestowed by the British government for non-operational gallantry or gallantry not in the presence of an enemy. In the UK honours system, the George Cross is equal in stature to the Victoria Cross. This has been the case since the introduction of the George Cross in 1940. The two Gurkha recipients of the George Cross or its erstwhile equivalent the Empire Gallantry Medal (EGM) are Nandlal Thapa and Chitrabahadur Gurung. Both were awarded the Empire Gallantry Medal for their gallantry in the rescue operations following the 1935 Quetta Earthquake. When the George Cross was created in 1940, recipients of the EGM could exchange their EGMs for the GC. Thapa did that, but Gurung could not, since the latter died in 1939.

== Recipients ==
* indicates that the Victoria Cross was awarded posthumously

Gurkha Brigade Victoria Cross Recipients
Name	Unit (Note: Staff corps were created in 1861 to provide British officers for native regiments, including the Gurkhas, who were designated as "attached to" the various native groups. The units are ordered by Gurkha regiment.)	Date of action	Conflict	Place of action
John Tytler	66th Bengal Native Infantry later 1st King George V's Own Gurkha Rifles	1858	Indian Rebellion of 1857	Choorpoorah, India
Donald Macintyre	Bengal Staff Corps attached to 2nd King Edward VII's Own Gurkha Rifles	1872	Looshai Expedition	Lalgnoora, India
George Channer	Bengal Staff Corps attached to 1st King George V's Own Gurkha Rifles	1875	Perak War	Perak, Malaya
John Cook	Bengal Staff Corps attached to 5th Royal Gurkha Rifles	1878	Second Anglo-Afghan War	Peiwar Kotal, Afghanistan
Richard Ridgeway	Bengal Staff Corps attached to 8th Gurkha Rifles	1879	Naga Hills expeditions	Konoma, India
Charles Grant	Indian Staff Corps attached to 8th Gurkha Rifles	1891	Manipur Expedition	Thobal, Burma
Guy Boisragon	Indian Staff Corps attached to 5th Royal Gurkha Rifles	1891	Hunza–Naga campaign	Nilt Fort, India
John Manners Smith	Indian Staff Corps attached to 5th Royal Gurkha Rifles	1891	Hunza–Naga campaign	Nilt Fort, India
William Walker	4th Prince of Wales' Own Gurkha Rifles	1903	Third Somaliland Expedition	Daratoleh, Somaliland
John Grant	8th Gurkha Rifles	1904	British expedition to Tibet	Gyantse Jong, Tibet
Kulbir Thapa	3rd Queen Alexandra's Own Gurkha Rifles	1915	First World War	Fauquissart, France
George Wheeler	9th Gurkha Rifles	1917	First World War	Shumran, Mesopotamia
Karanbahadur Rana	3rd Queen Alexandra's Own Gurkha Rifles	1918	First World War	El Kefr, Egypt
Lalbahadur Thapa	2nd King Edward VII's Own Gurkha Rifles	1943	Second World War	Rass-es-Zouai, Tunisia
Gaje Ghale	5th Royal Gurkha Rifles	1943	Second World War	Chin Hills, Burma
Michael Allmand	Indian Armoured Corps attached to 6th Gurkha Rifles	1944*	Second World War	Pin Hmi Road Bridge, Burma
Tulbahadur Pun	6th Gurkha Rifles	1944	Second World War	Mogaung, Burma
Netrabahadur Thapa	5th Royal Gurkha Rifles	1944*	Second World War	Bishenpur, Burma
Sher Bahadur Thapa	9th Gurkha Rifles	1944*	Second World War	San Marino, Italy
Agansing Rai	5th Royal Gurkha Rifles	1944	Second World War	Bishenpur, Burma
Thaman Gurung	5th Royal Gurkha Rifles	1944*	Second World War	Monte San Bartolo, Italy
Frank Blaker	Highland Light Infantry attached to 9th Gurkha Rifles	1944*	Second World War	Taunggyi, Burma
Ganju Lama/Gyamtso Shangderpa	7th Gurkha Rifles	1944	Second World War	Ningthoukhong, Burma
Lachhiman Gurung	8th Gurkha Rifles	1945	Second World War	Taungdaw, Burma
Bhanbhagta Gurung	2nd King Edward VII's Own Gurkha Rifles	1945	Second World War	Snowdon East, Tamandu, Burma
Rambahadur Limbu	10th Princess Mary's Own Gurkha Rifles	1965	Indonesia–Malaysia confrontation	Sarawak, Borneo

== Sources ==
- Parker, John (2005). The Gurkhas: The Inside Story of the World's Most Feared Soldiers. Headline Book Publishing. ISBN 978-0-7553-1415-7.
