= Jangir-e-Lae =

- Part of Hunza–Nagar Campaign
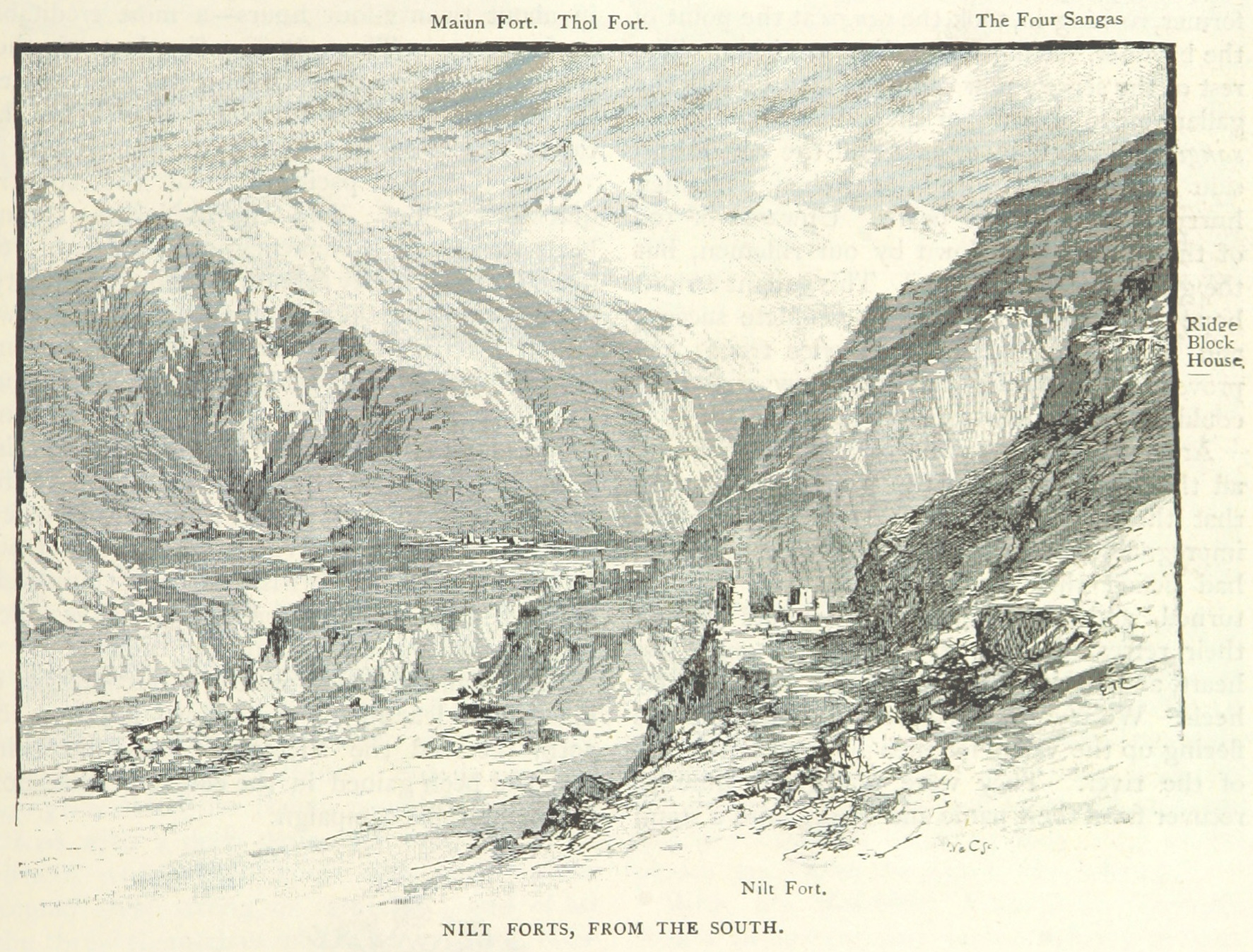
- Nilt forts
Date	1 December – 23 December, 1891 (23 days)
Location	Nagar
Result	British Indian Victory

Belligerents
Nagar	British Raj

Commanders and leaders
Azur Khan	Algernon George Arnold Durand

Strength
100+	1,000 regulars 2,360 irregulars

Casualties and losses
100+ 127 captured	54+

The Jangir-e-Lae (otherwise known as the Anglo-Brusho War) was a battle fought by troops from the British Raj under the command of Colonel Algernon George Arnold Durand against the people of Nagar and Hunza in the area of Nilt in modern-day Pakistan from December 1 to 23, 1891 as part of the Hunza–Nagar Campaign. The Nagar and Hunza people at the time were led by Tham (Chief) Azur Khan who was acting on behalf of his father Jafar Zahid Khan who was paralyzed. The British were victorious and gained control of Nagar and its forts (Nilt Fort, Mayun Fort, and Thole Fort) after continuous fighting lasting over 20 days. More than 100 people from Nagar lost their lives with another 127 imprisoned. On the British side, four British officers and over 50 Dogra levies were killed.

On December 2, the British captured Nilt Fort but were unable to seize the Mayun Fort. Durand was injured in this engagement. One of Nagar's commanders Mohammad Shah Wazir was killed on the same day.

On December 23, the final fort fell into British hands.

Azur Khan fled during the battle to Chinese Turkestan where he was later apprehended by the Chinese and turned over to the British. He was imprisoned in Srinagar and later placed under house arrest.

The battle, as well as the Hunza-Nagar Campaign, were part of attempts by the British Empire to check the expansion and influences of the Russian Empire and, to a lesser extent, the Qing Empire in Central Asia.
