= Lachhiman Gurung =

Nepalese Gurkha recipient of the Victoria Cross

Lachhiman Gurung VC
- Gurung in 2003
- Born: 30 December 1917; Dahakhani, Chitwan, Kingdom of Nepal
- Died: 12 December 2010 (aged 92); London, England
- Military career
- Allegiance: British India; India
- Branch: British Indian Army; Indian Army
- Service years: 1940–1947
- Rank: Hon. Havildar
- Nickname: VC Baajey (Note: Baajey translates to "Grandpa" in Nepali.)
- Service number: 87726
- Units: 4th Battalion, 8th Gurkha Rifles, Indian Army
- Conflicts: World War II • Burma campaign
- Awards: Victoria Cross

Lachhiman Gurung VC (Nepali: लाछिमान गुरुङ; 30 December 1917 – 12 December 2010) was a Nepalese Gurkha recipient of the Victoria Cross, the highest and most prestigious award for gallantry in the face of the enemy that can be awarded to British and Commonwealth forces. He is best known as the "Gurkha who took on 200 soldiers with only one hand" because of his actions in World War II.

== Birth ==
Gurung was born on 30 December 1917, in the village of Dahakhani VDC (now also called Ichchhakamana Rural Municipality), Chitwan District of Nepal, the son of Partiman Gurung.

== Army service ==
He joined the British Indian Army in December 1940, permitted to enlist in wartime although he was only 4 ft 11 in (1.50 m) tall and so below the peacetime minimum height. He was 27 years old, and a rifleman in the 4th Battalion, 8th Gurkha Rifles, in the Indian Army during World War II when the following deed took place in May 1945 for which he was awarded the VC.

His battalion was part of the 89th Indian Infantry Brigade of the 7th Indian Infantry Division, which was ordered to cross the Irrawaddy River and attack Japanese forces to the north of the road from Prome to Taungup. The Japanese withdrew towards Taungdaw, where Gurung was part of the two companies of the 4th Battalion, 8th Gurkha Rifles, waiting when the Japanese attacked in force in the early morning.

On 12/13 May 1945 at Taungdaw, Burma (now Myanmar), Rifleman Lachhiman Gurung was manning the most forward post of his platoon which bore the brunt of an attack by at least 200 of the Japanese enemy. He hurled back two hand grenades which had landed in his trench, but the third exploded in his right hand after he attempted to throw it back, blowing off his fingers, shattering his arm and severely wounding him in the face, body and right leg. His two comrades were also badly wounded. The rifleman disregarded his wounds and loaded and fired his rifle with his left hand for four hours (all while screaming "Come and fight a Gurkha!"), calmly waiting for each attack which he met with fire at point blank range.

His citation in The London Gazette ends with...

...Of the 87 enemy dead counted in the immediate vicinity of the Company locality, 31 lay in front of this Rifleman's section, the key to the whole position. Had the enemy succeeded in over-running and occupying Rifleman Lachhiman Gurung's trench, the whole of the reverse slope position would have been completely dominated and turned.

This Rifleman, by his magnificent example, so inspired his comrades to resist the enemy to the last, that, although surrounded and cut off for three days and two nights, they held and smashed every attack.

His outstanding gallantry and extreme devotion to duty, in the face of almost overwhelming odds, were the main factors in the defeat of the enemy.

He received his Victoria Cross from the Viceroy of India, Field Marshal Lord Wavell at the Red Fort in Delhi on 19 December 1945.

Gurung was hospitalised for the wounds he received during the above action and subsequently lost his right eye and the use of his right hand, but he continued to serve with the 8th Gurkhas, choosing to remain with them when they were transferred to the newly independent Indian Army in 1947. He later achieved the rank of Hon. Havildar and he returned to his village in Nepal on completion of his service in 1947.

== Later life ==
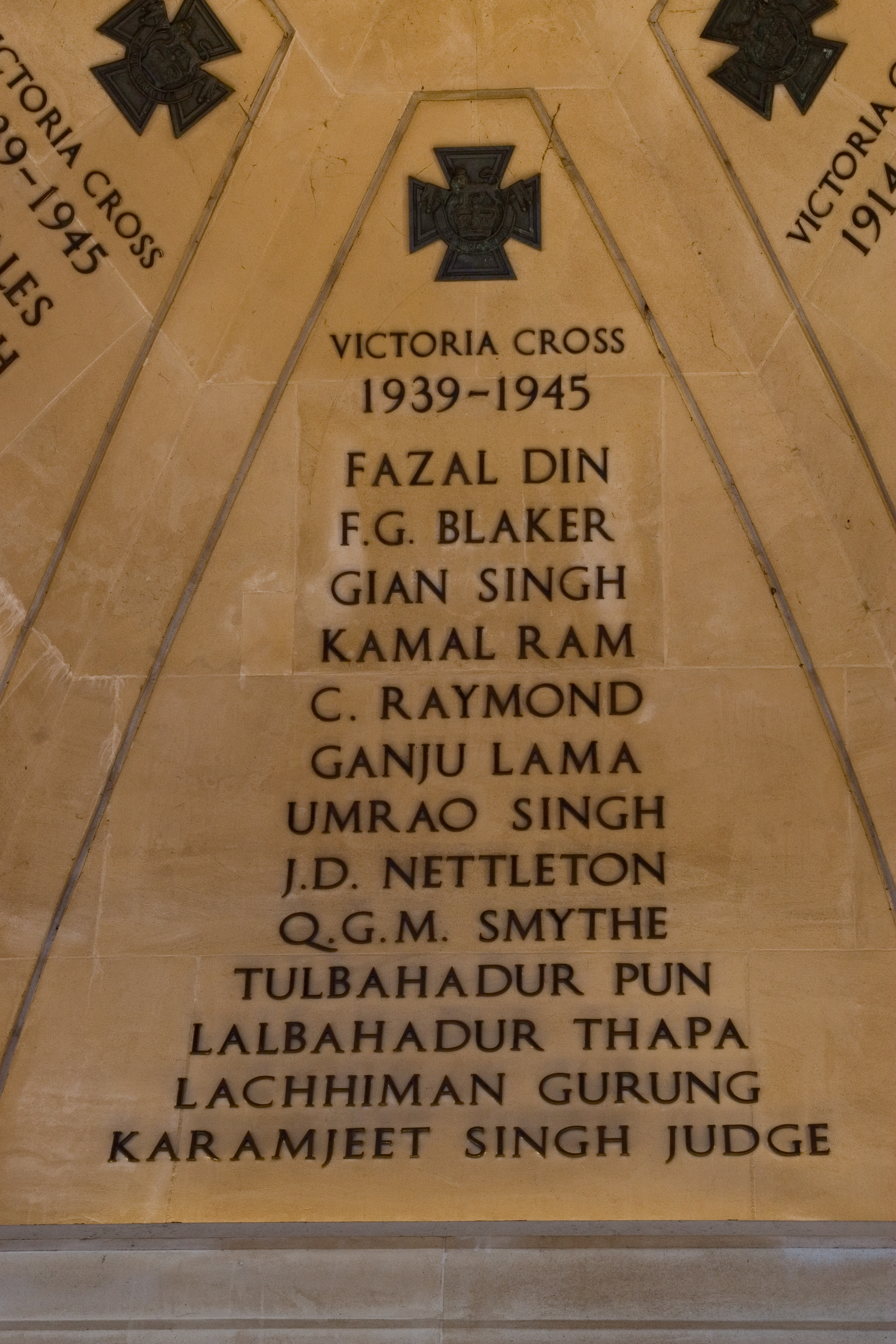
Inscription of Lachhiman Gurung VC's name on the "Memorial Gates" at Constitution Hill, London SW1

Back home, he farmed on a small holding.

He married twice; having two sons and a daughter from his first marriage, and two more sons from his second. One of his sons later became an officer in the 8th Gurkha Rifles.

A new house was provided for him and his family in 1995 near the Gurkha Welfare Centre at Chitwan, using a donation of £2,000 from Armourers and Brasiers Company. Later in 1995, he received a cheque for £100,500 from the Gurkha Welfare Trust, presented by British Prime Minister John Major at 10 Downing Street. £8,000 was also awarded to him by the Indian Army as a loan for his Victoria Cross medal, which he gave to them as an inspiration for young servicemen.

In 2008, Gurung and Honorary Lieutenant Tul Bahadur Pun VC were two of the five claimants in a legal claim to allow Gurkha servicemen who had retired before July 1997 (when the Gurkha base moved from Hong Kong to the UK) to settle in the UK. The High Court ordered the government to review its policy, and Gurung was allowed to settle in Hounslow, where he was looked after by his granddaughter, Amrita.

Gurung was admitted to the Charing Cross Hospital on 19 November after his health worsened, suffering from pneumonia. Gurung died on 12 December 2010. He was surrounded by his second wife, Manmaya, and his five children.

His funeral was held on Wednesday 22 December 2010 at Hounslow Civic Centre, Lampton Road, Hounslow, Middlesex, TW3 4DN.

== The medal ==
The medal is currently held in India, in the possession of Gurung's parent unit, the 4th Battalion, 8th Gurkha Rifles.

== See also ==
- List of Brigade of Gurkhas recipients of the Victoria Cross

== Bibliography ==
- Parker, John (2005). The Gurkhas: The Inside Story of the World's Most Feared Soldiers. Headline Book Publishing. ISBN 978-0-7553-1415-7.
