= John Manners Smith =

Lieutenant-Colonel of the British Indian Army

Lieutenant-Colonel John Manners Smith VC CIE CVO
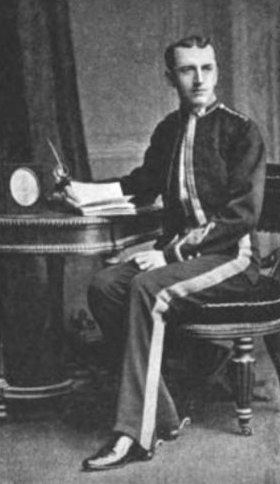
- Born: 30 August 1864; Lahore, British India
- Died: 6 January 1920 (aged 55); London, England
- Burial place: Kensal Green Cemetery
- Military career
- Allegiance: United Kingdom
- Branch: British Indian Army
- Rank: Lieutenant-Colonel
- Units: Norfolk Regiment; Indian Staff Corps - 5th Gurkha Rifles (Frontier Force)
- Conflicts: Hunza-Naga Campaign; Tirah Campaign
- Awards: Victoria Cross; Order of the Indian Empire; Royal Victorian Order

Lieutenant-Colonel John Manners Smith VC CIE CVO (30 August 1864 – 6 January 1920) was a British Indian Army and Indian Political Service officer who was a recipient of the Victoria Cross, the highest and most prestigious award for gallantry in the face of the enemy that can be awarded to British and Commonwealth forces.

== Biography ==
=== Early life and career ===
Smith was educated at Norwich School and Royal Military College, Sandhurst. After transferring from the Norfolk Regiment to the British Indian Army, Smith joined the Indian Staff Corps and served with 3rd Sikhs and 5th Gurkha Rifles from 1885 to 1887, when he was appointed to the Indian Political Department. He accompanied Sir Mortimer Durand on missions to Sikkim in 1888 and to Kabul in 1893.

=== Victoria Cross ===
Smith was 27 years old, and a lieutenant in the Indian Staff Corps and 5th Gurkha Rifles, British Indian Army, during the Hunza-Naga Campaign, India when the following deed took place for which he was awarded the VC.

On 20 December 1891 near Nilt Fort, British India, Lieutenant Smith led the storming party at the attack and capture of a strong position occupied by the enemy. For nearly four hours on the face of the cliff which was almost precipitous, he moved his handful of men from point to point, and during this time he was unable to defend himself from any attack which the enemy chose to make. He was the first man to reach the summit within a few yards of one of the enemy's sangars, which was immediately rushed, the lieutenant pistolling the first man.

=== Later life and career ===
Between 1889 and 1918, Smith held political appointments in Kashmir, Bundhelkand, Baluchistan, Rajputana, Central India and Nepal. He was Chief Commissioner of Ajmer-Merwara from 1918 to 1919.

He was promoted major in July 1901. He achieved the rank of lieutenant colonel before he retired from the army.

His Victoria Cross is displayed at The Gurkha Museum in Winchester, Hampshire, England.

== See also ==
- List of Brigade of Gurkhas recipients of the Victoria Cross

== Bibliography ==
- Harries, R.; Cattermole, P.; Mackintosh, P. (1991). A History of Norwich School: King Edward VI's Grammar School at Norwich. Norwich: Friends of Norwich School. ISBN 978-0-9518561-1-6.

Government offices
Preceded by Elliot Colvin	Chief Commissioner of Ajmer-Merwara; 1918–1919	Succeeded by Robert Holland
