= John Cook (VC) =

Recipient of the Victoria Cross

John Cook VC
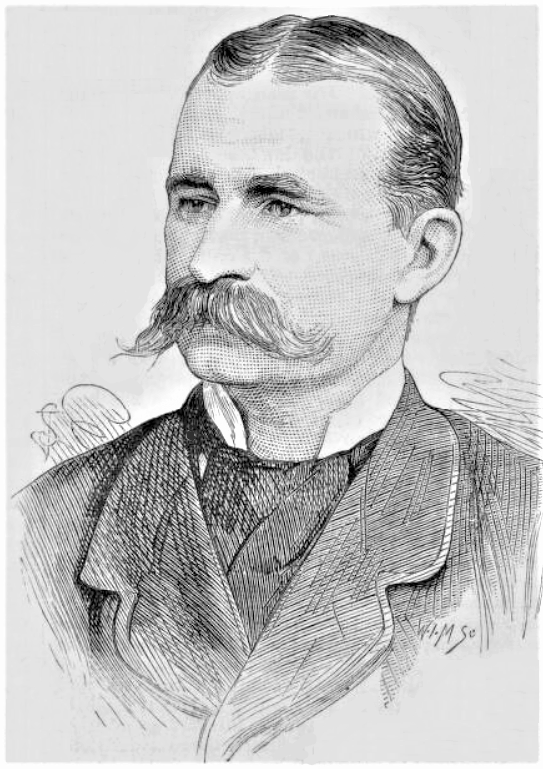
- Major Cook, depicted in the Illustrated London News
- Born: 28 August 1843; Edinburgh, Scotland
- Died: 19 December 1879 (aged 36); Sherpur, Afghanistan
- Burial place: Sherpur Cantonment Cemetery, Kabul
- Military career
- Allegiance: United Kingdom
- Branch: British Indian Army
- Unit: Bengal Staff Corps / 5th Gurkha Rifles
- Conflicts: Umbeyla Frontier Campaign; Second Anglo-Afghan War †
- Awards: Victoria Cross

Major John Cook (28 August 1843 – 19 December 1879) was a Scottish recipient of the Victoria Cross, the highest and most prestigious award for gallantry in the face of the enemy that can be awarded to British and Commonwealth forces. An officer of the Bengal Staff Corps who transferred to the 5th Gurkha Rifles, Cook was a veteran of the Umbeyla Campaign who received the VC posthumously for his actions during the Second Anglo-Afghan War.

== Early life ==
Born in Edinburgh, Cook was educated at Edinburgh Academy before attending the Scottish Naval and Military Academy in Edinburgh from 1856 to 1858, Dr Greig's School in London from 1858 to 1859, and finally the Royal India Military College at Addiscombe from 1859 to 1860.

== Military career ==
Cook sailed to India in late 1861 at the age of eighteen, joining the British Indian Army, Bengal Staff Corps as an ensign before being promoted lieutenant on 29 March 1862, and soon after his arrival was posted to the 3rd Sikh Infantry.

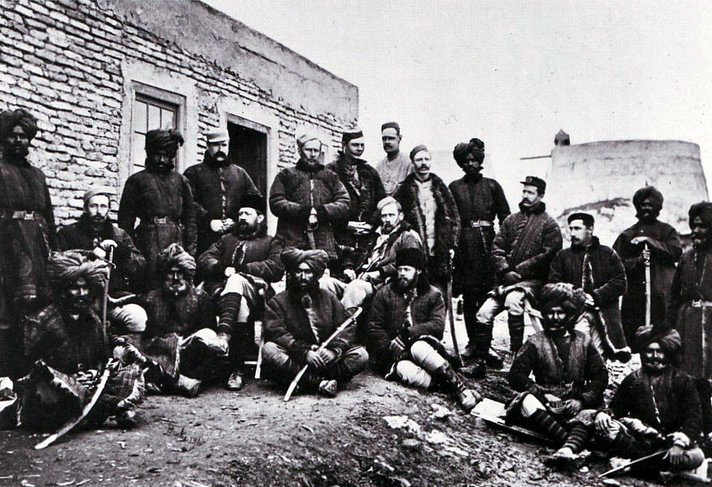
3rd Sikh Infantry at Kabul, 1879.

He was mentioned in despatches for his services in the Umbeyla Campaign in 1863, and also distinguished himself while serving as adjutant of his regiment in the Black Mountain campaign, Hazara Expedition of 1868 on the North West Frontier.

After being promoted captain on 19 December 1872, Cook transferred to the 5th Gurkha Rifles as wing commander in 1873.

On 24 September 1878 at the beginning of the Second Anglo-Afghan War, the 5th Gurkha Rifles were warned for active service, and in October proceeded from Abbottabad to Thal. Here it joined Sir Frederick Robert's Kurram Valley Field Force. Cook crossed the frontier with his regiment as part of Brigadier-General Thelwall's 2nd Brigade and following the reconnaissance of Peiwar Kotal Pass, won his Victoria Cross on the slopes of the Spingawai Kotal, or White Cow Pass. Captain Cook led repeated charges against enemy barricades with a joint force of 5th Gurkhas and 72nd Highlanders. At dawn, as the Afghans fled their positions, Cook collected a few men and charged and killed a large number of enemy who were trying to rescue one of their guns before going to the aide of Major Galbraith. Cook's helmet was pierced by an enemy bullet.

== Victoria Cross ==
He was 35 years old, and a captain in the Bengal Staff Corps, British Indian Army, and 5th Gurkha Rifles during the Second Anglo-Afghan War when the following deed took place for which he was awarded the VC:

For a signal act of valour at the action of the Peiwar Kotal on the 2nd December, 1878, in having, during a very heavy, fire, charged out of the entrenchments with such impetuosity that the enemy broke and fled, when, perceiving, at the close of the melee, the danger of Major Galbraith, Assistant Adjutant-General, Kurum Column Field Force, who was in personal conflict with an Afghan soldier, Captain Cook distracted his attention to himself, and aiming a sword cut which the Douranee avoided, sprang upon him, and, grasping his throat, grappled with him. They both fell to the ground. The Douranee, a most powerful man, still endeavouring to use his rifle, seized Captain Cook's arm in his teeth until the struggle was ended by the man being shot through the head.

He was promoted to the brevet rank of major on 22 November 1879 in recognition of his services during the Afghan Campaign.

== Death in action ==
Cook was attached to Macpherson's Brigade during the December 1879 Siege of the Sherpur Cantonment at Kabul. On 11 December, Cook participated in the attempt to attack the Afghans in the rear at Argundeh but – faced by overwhelming numbers – they were forced to fall back towards Sherpur. Late in the day, Cook distinguished himself in the rearguard action which saved the brigade's baggage. He fought a determined throng of Afghans, and resorted to a bayonet charge which he led with his brother, Lieutenant Walter Cook, 3rd Sikhs, which forced the Afghans to withdraw. Walter Cook was shot in the chest and was carried wounded to the Sherpur Cantonment and John Cook received a head wound.

The next day, 12 December, Cook was still able to take part in the attack on the That-i-Shah peak, which dominated the high ground around Kabul. During this action Cook received a fatal wound, being struck by a bullet that passed through the bone of his left leg below the knee. After spending the night on the hill in the open he was taken to the hospital at the besieged Sherpur, and died of wounds on 19 December 1879.

On 21 December 1879, Cook was buried in the Sherpur Cantonment British Cemetery, locally known as the 'Gora Kabar' which literally means 'White Graveyard'. He was mentioned in despatches by Frederick Roberts on 23 January 1880.

== Medals and awards ==
- Victoria Cross on 21 March 1879.
- Mentioned in Despatches in May 1880.
- India General Service Medal (1854–1895) with clasps "North West Frontier" and "Umbeyla"
- Afghanistan Medal (1878–1880) with clasps "Peiwar Kotal", "Charisia" and "Kabul"

The Victoria Cross and campaign medals awarded to Cook were sold on 17 September 2004 by the London auctioneers Dix Noonan Webb for £82,000. They were purchased for the Michael Ashcroft Trust, the holding institution for Lord Ashcroft's VC collection, which is displayed at the Imperial War Museum in London.

== See also ==
- List of Brigade of Gurkhas recipients of the Victoria Cross

== Bibliography ==
- Hensman, Howard (2009). The Afghan War 1879–1880. Lancer. ISBN 978-0981537863.
- Weekes, Colonel H.E. (2009). History of the 5th Royal Gurkha Rifles. Naval & Military Press. ISBN 978-1843427728.
