= Bhanbhagta Gurung =

Nepalese Gurkha soldier and recipient of the Victoria Cross

Bhanbhagta Gurung VC
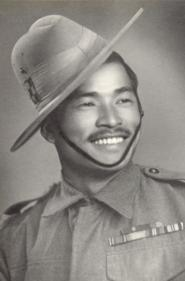
- Born: September 1921; Phalbu, Nepal
- Died: 1 March 2008 (aged 86); Gorkha, Nepal
- Military career
- Allegiance: British India
- Branch: British Indian Army
- Service years: 1939–1946
- Rank: Hon. Havildar
- Units: 2nd Gurkha Rifles
- Conflicts: World War II: Burma campaign
- Awards: Victoria Cross; Star of Nepal

Havildar Bhanbhagta Gurung, VC (Nepali: भनभक्त गुरुङ; September 1921 – 1 March 2008), also known as Bhanbhakta Gurung, was a Nepalese Gurkha recipient of the Victoria Cross, the highest and most prestigious award for gallantry in the face of the enemy that can be awarded to British and Commonwealth forces, awarded for his actions while serving as a Rifleman with the 3rd Battalion of the 2nd Gurkha Rifles in Burma during the Second World War.

== Early life and service ==
Bhanbhagta Gurung was born in Phalpu, a small hill village in western Nepal in the district of Gorkha in September 1921. He enlisted in the British Indian Army during World War II, joining 3rd Battalion of the 2nd King Edward VII's Own Gurkha Rifles (The Sirmoor Rifles), which recruited from the Gurung people, at the age of eighteen.

Promoted to lance naik (equivalent to lance corporal), he served in the first Chindit expedition (Operation Longcloth) led by Brigadier Orde Wingate into northern Burma in March 1943. He was serving in Number 4 Column, deep behind Japanese lines across the Chindwin River, when the column was ambushed by the Japanese 33rd Division and ordered to disperse. His battalion was withdrawn from the line after the expedition for several months of training and refitting, and redeployed in March 1944 in Arakan in the 25th Indian Infantry Division, fighting down the Mayu Range towards Akyab. Bhanbhagta was promoted to Naik (corporal).

Shortly before the action that won him the VC, he had been reduced to the ranks for neglect of duty after being blamed for taking the wrong hill, to the ire of the battalion commander (although it later transpired that he had followed the orders of his platoon commander, who had given him the wrong target).

In February 1945, the 25th Indian Division landed at Ru-ywa, as a diversion from the offensive by General Sir William Slim's Fourteenth Army towards Mandalay, and advanced to the Irrawaddy River through the An pass, held by the Japanese 54th Division from a number of hills. The Gurkhas held two hills, code-named "Snowdon" and "Snowdon East", but were attacked by the Japanese and pushed back. They were ordered to retake the hills.

== Details ==
Bhanbhagta Gurung was about 24 years old, and a Rifleman in the 3rd Battalion, 2nd Gurkha Rifles, British Indian Army when the following deed took place for which he was awarded the VC:

On 5 March 1945 at Snowdon-East, near Tamandu, Burma (now Myanmar), Gurung and his unit were approaching Snowdon-East. His section became pinned down by enemy fire including machine guns and mortars. An enemy sniper in a tree was inflicting casualties on the section, "Rifleman Bhanbhagta Gurung, being unable to fire from the lying position, stood up fully exposed to the heavy fire and calmly killed the enemy sniper with his rifle, thus saving his section from suffering further casualties".

The section advanced to within 20 yards of the objective, and again it came under fire. Without waiting for orders, Gurung dashed out alone to attack the first enemy fox-hole. "Throwing two grenades, he killed the two occupants and without any hesitation rushed on to the next enemy fox-hole and killed the Japanese in it with his bayonet". He cleared two further fox-holes with bayonet and grenades. "During his single-handed attacks on these four enemy fox-holes, Rifleman Bhanbhagta Gurung was subjected to almost continuous and point-blank Light Machine Gun fire from a bunker on the North tip of the objective." Knowing that the bunker would hold up both his own platoon and another, "for the fifth time [he] went forward alone in the face of heavy enemy fire to knock out this position. He doubled forward and leapt on to the roof of the bunker from where, his hand grenades being finished, he flung two No. 77 smoke grenades into the bunker slit." Gurung killed two Japanese soldiers who ran out of the bunker with his Kukri, and then crawled into the cramped bunker and killed the remaining Japanese soldier by "beat[ing] the gunner's brains out with a rock".

Gurung ordered a Bren gunner and two riflemen to take up positions in the bunker. "The enemy counter-attack followed soon after, but under Rifleman Bhanbhagta Gurung's command the small party inside the bunker repelled it with heavy loss to the enemy. Rifleman Bhanbhagta Gurung showed outstanding bravery and a complete disregard for his own safety. His courageous clearing of five enemy positions single-handed was in itself decisive in capturing the objective and his inspiring example to the rest of the Company contributed to the speedy consolidation of this success."

His regiment gained the battle honour "Tamandu" as a result of the engagement and he received his Victoria Cross from King George VI at Buckingham Palace.

== Later life ==
Soon after the war ended, Gurung's company commander tried to persuade him to continue serving, but he declined as he had a frail widowed mother as well as a young wife and children to take care of in Nepal. When he quit the regiment in January 1946 he had regained his former rank of Naik and had been given the rank of Honorary Havildar. In addition to his VC he was also awarded the Star of Nepal, 3rd Class, in 1945. In 2000 the Gurkha training company block at Catterick Garrison in the UK was named after him.

His three sons also served in the 2nd Gurkhas. Bhanbhagta suffered from asthma for many years and for the last four years of his life was housebound at his youngest son's house at Gorkha. His oldest son Krishna Bahadur Gurung's youngest son is now a captain in the 1RGR army in Brunei with his wife and children.

He died on 1 March 2008, aged 86.

== The medal ==
His Victoria Cross is displayed at The Gurkha Museum at Winchester, Hampshire, in England.

== See also ==
- List of Brigade of Gurkhas recipients of the Victoria Cross
