= William George Walker =

British Indian Army officer and recipient of the Victoria Cross

Major-General William George Walker VC CB
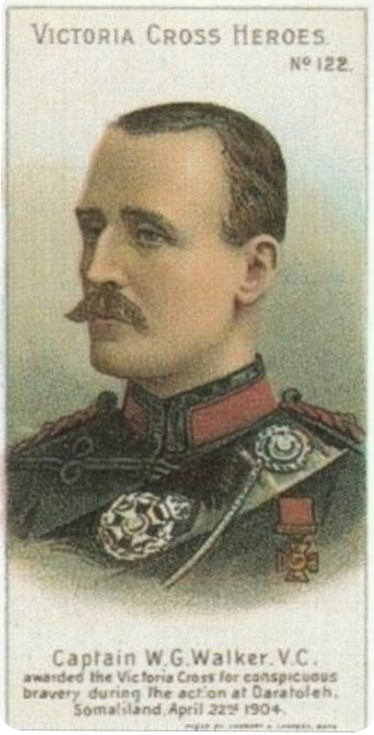
- Captain Walker depicted on a cigarette card
- Born: 29 May 1863; Nainital, British India
- Died: 16 February 1936 (aged 72); Seaford, East Sussex, England
- Military career
- Allegiance: United Kingdom
- Branch: British Indian Army
- Rank: Major-General
- Units: 4th Gurkha Rifles
- Commands: 2nd Division; 9th Sirhind Brigade
- Conflicts: Third Somaliland Expedition; First World War
- Awards: Victoria Cross; Companion of the Order of the Bath; Mentioned in Despatches

Major-General William George Walker, VC, CB (29 May 1863 – 16 February 1936) was a senior British Indian Army officer and a recipient of the Victoria Cross.

== Early career ==
Walker was born at Nainital, India, on 29 May 1863, the son of Deputy Surgeon General William Walker, Indian Medical Service. He was commissioned in the Suffolk Regiment in August 1885, seconded to the Indian Staff Corps in May 1887, and promoted to captain in 1896. In India, Walker served on the North-West Frontier, including campaigns in Samana, 1891 and Waziristan, 1894–95. In 1903–04 he served in the Dervish War.

== VC action ==
Walker was 39 years old, and a captain in the 4th Gurkha Rifles, Indian Army, attached to the Bikanir Camel Corps during the Third Somaliland Expedition when he won the VC. On 22 April 1903 after the action at Daratoleh, British Somaliland, the rearguard got considerably behind the rest of the column. Captain Walker and Captain George Murray Rolland, with four other men, were with a fellow officer when he fell badly wounded, and while one went for assistance, Captain Walker and the rest stayed with him, endeavouring to keep off the enemy. This they succeeded in doing, and when the officer in command of the column, Major John Edmund Gough, arrived, they managed to get the wounded man on to a camel. He was, however, hit a second time and died immediately. Rolland and Gough also received the VC for this action.

== Later life ==
Walker returned to India, and served as commandant of the 1st Battalion, 4th Gurkha Rifles, becoming a brevet lieutenant colonel in September 1904, a colonel in January 1911, and appointed a Companion of the Order of the Bath (CB) in June 1914.

Walker served in the First World War. His first major role was when he was made commander of the 9th Sirhind Brigade from 3 January 1915 when he was promoted to the temporary rank of brigadier general and assigned to command the brigade. He achieved the temporary rank of major general on 5 November 1915 and succeeded Major General Henry Horne as general officer commanding (GOC) of the 2nd Division. In 1916 his temporary rank became permanent "for distinguished service in the Field",

Walker died at the age of 72 on 16 February 1936 in Seaford, East Sussex, and was cremated at the Woodvale Crematorium in Brighton and is commemorated there.

His VC is displayed at the National Army Museum, Chelsea, London.

== See also ==
- List of Brigade of Gurkhas recipients of the Victoria Cross

== Notes ==
Military offices
Preceded by Henry Horne	GOC 2nd Division; 1915–1916	Succeeded by Cecil Pereira
