= George Campbell Wheeler =

George Campbell Wheeler VC
- Born: 7 April 1880; Yokohama, Japan
- Died: 26 August 1938 (aged 58); Barton-on-Sea, Hampshire
- Burial place: St Mary Magdalene Churchyard, New Milton
- Military career
- Allegiance: United Kingdom
- Branch: British Indian Army
- Service years: 1900-
- Rank: Lieutenant colonel
- Units: 9th Gurkha Rifles
- Conflicts: World War I
- Awards: Victoria Cross

George Campbell Wheeler VC (7 April 1880 – 26 August 1938) was a recipient of the Victoria Cross, the highest and most prestigious award for gallantry in the face of the enemy that can be awarded to British and Commonwealth forces.

== Early life ==
Wheeler was born in 1880, and attended Bedford School from 1893 to 1897. He was commissioned as a second lieutenant on the unattached list on 20 January 1900 "with a view to [his] appointment on the Indian Staff Corps". Posted to the Madras Command three months later, he was formally transferred to the Indian Staff Corps in april 1901, and served with the 9th (Gurkha Rifle) Bengal Infantry. He was promoted to lieutenant on 20 April 1902.

== Details ==
He was 36 years old, and a major in the 2nd Battalion, 9th Gurkha Rifles, British Indian Army during World War I when the following deed took place for which he was awarded the VC.

On 23 February 1917 at Shumran on the River Tigris, Mesopotamia, Major Wheeler, together with one Gurkha officer and eight men of Khas battalion crossed the river and rushed the enemy's trench in the face of very heavy fire. Having obtained a footing on the far bank, he was almost immediately counter-attacked by the enemy with a party of bombers. Major Wheeler at once led a charge, receiving in the process a severe bayonet wound in the head. In spite of this, however, he managed to disperse the enemy and consolidate his position.

He later achieved the rank of lieutenant colonel.

== The medal ==
His Victoria Cross is displayed at the National Army Museum, Chelsea, London.

== See also ==
- List of Brigade of Gurkhas recipients of the Victoria Cross
