= Guy Boisragon =

Recipient of the Victoria Cross

Brigadier Guy Hudleston Boisragon VC
- Born: 5 November 1864; Kohat, British India
- Died: 14 July 1931 (aged 66); Biarritz, France
- Burial place: Kensal Green Cemetery
- Relatives: Alan Maxwell Boisragon (first cousin)
- Military career
- Allegiance: United Kingdom
- Branch: British Indian Army
- Rank: Brigadier
- Units: 1/5 Gurkha Rifles (Frontier Force)
- Commands: 1/5 Gurkha Rifles (Frontier Force)
- Conflicts: North-West Frontier; Hunza-Naga Campaign; Tirah Campaign; World War I
- Awards: Victoria Cross

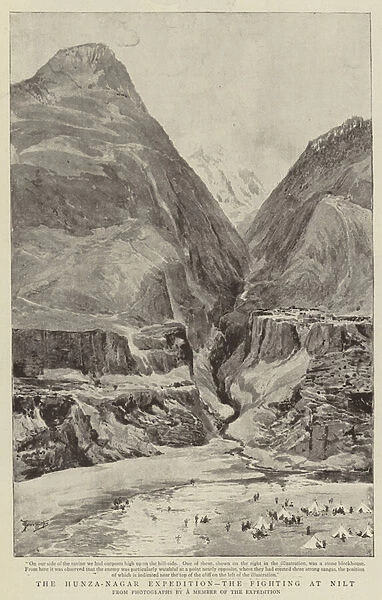
Fighting at the Nilt Fort where Boisragon won his VC

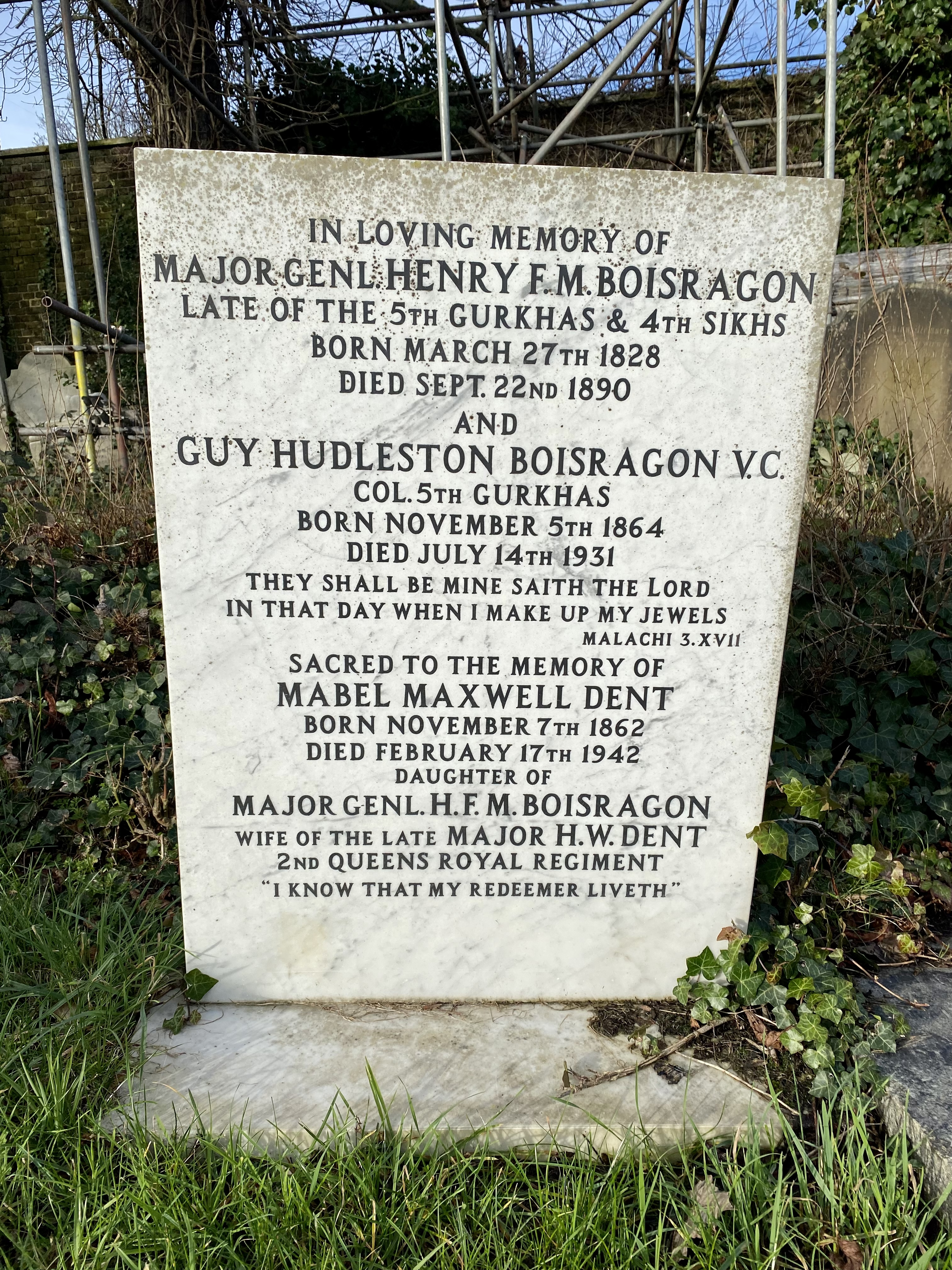
Boisragon's grave at Kensal Green Cemetery in 2024

Brigadier Guy Hudleston Boisragon VC (5 November 1864 – 14 July 1931) was a recipient of the Victoria Cross, the highest and most prestigious award for gallantry in the face of the enemy that can be awarded to British and Commonwealth forces.

Boisragon was 27 years old, and a lieutenant in the Indian Staff Corps, British Indian Army, and 5th Gurkha Rifles during the Hunza-Nagar Campaign, India when the following deed took place for which he was awarded the VC.

On 2 December 1891 during the attack on Nilt Fort, India, Lieutenant Boisragon led the assault, forcing his way through difficult obstacles to the inner gate, when he returned for reinforcements, moving fearlessly to and fro under heavy cross-fire until he had collected sufficient men to drive the enemy from the fort.

He later achieved the rank of brigadier.

== Medal entitlement ==
Brigadier Guy Hudleston Boisragon is entitled to the following medals

Ribbon	Description	Notes
	Victoria Cross (VC)	1892
	India General Service Medal (1854)	5 Clasps -: Hazara 1888; Hazara 1891; Samana 1891; Hunza 1891; Waziristan 1894–95
	India Medal	3 Clasps -: Punjab Frontier 1897–98; Samana 1897; Tirah 1897–98
	1914-15 Star	
	British War Medal	
	World War I Victory Medal	Mentioned in dispatches
	Order of the Nile	Egypt – 4th Class
	King George V Coronation Medal	1911

== See also ==
- List of Brigade of Gurkhas recipients of the Victoria Cross
