= Donald Macintyre (Indian Army officer) =

Winner of the Victoria Cross

Major General Donald Macintyre VC
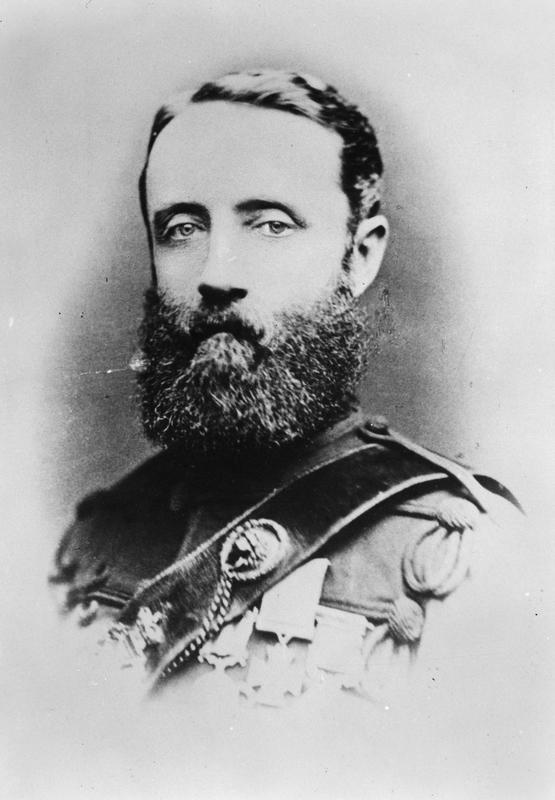
- Born: 12 September 1831; Kincraig, Inverness-shire
- Died: 15 April 1903 (aged 71); Fortrose, Ross-shire
- Burial place: Rosemarkie Churchyard
- Relatives: William Brydon CB (brother-in-law); James Travers VC (brother-in-law)
- Military career
- Allegiance: United Kingdom
- Branch: British Indian Army
- Rank: Major general
- Units: Bengal Staff Corps
- Conflicts: Lushai Expedition; Second Anglo-Afghan War
- Awards: Victoria Cross

Major General Donald Macintyre VC (12 September 1831 – 15 April 1903) was a Scottish recipient of the Victoria Cross, the highest and most prestigious award for gallantry in the face of the enemy that can be awarded to British and Commonwealth forces.

== Early life ==
Macintyre was born in Kincraig, Scotland in 1831, the second son of Donald Macintyre of Calcutta and his wife, Margaret Mackenzie. Of his sisters, one married the army surgeon William Brydon, one of the few European survivors of the 1842 retreat from Kabul, and another James Travers, who won the VC in the Indian Mutiny.

Macintyre was educated at Addiscombe Military Seminary from 1848 to 1850.

== Career ==
Macintyre obtained a commission in the Bengal Army of the British Indian Army in June 1850. Joining the 66th Gurkha Regiment, he served in a number of small campaigns on the North West Frontier. During the 1857–8 Indian Mutiny, he helped raise an extra Gurkha regiment (later the 4th Gurkha Rifles), and to protect the hill passes on the Kali Kumaon frontier from Rohilkhand rebels. He was promoted to captain in June 1862.

Becoming a major in June 1870, Macintyre served with the Lushai Expedition of 1871–2 as second in command of the 2nd Gurkha Rifles. It was here that Macintyre, a 40 year old major in the Bengal Staff Corps, was awarded the VC for the following deed:

On 4 January 1872 during the Lushai Campaign, Major Macintyre led the assault on the stockaded village of Lalgnoora. He was the first to reach and climb over the 8–9 feet high stockade, and successfully stormed it under heavy enemy fire.

He was also mentioned in dispatches and, in September 1872, promoted to brevet lieutenant-colonel. Macintyre was appointed lieutenant-colonel on 14 January 1876. He commanded the 2nd Prince of Wales's Own Gurkhas at the occupation of Cyprus (1878) and in the Second Anglo-Afghan War (1878–9).

In October 1887, Macintyre was appointed brevet colonel. He was granted the honorary rank of major general upon retirement in December 1880.

== Later life ==
Macintyre was an extensive traveller and fellow of the Royal Geographical Society. He published an account of his experiences in Hindu Koh: Wanderings and Wild Sports on and beyond the Himalayas (1889).

He subsequently lived in Fortrose, Ross-shire where he died on 15 April 1903, aged 71, and was buried in Rosemarkie churchyard.

== The medal ==
His Victoria Cross is displayed at The Gurkha Museum in Winchester, Hampshire, England.

== See also ==
- List of Brigade of Gurkhas recipients of the Victoria Cross
- Monuments to Courage (David Harvey, 1999)
- The Register of the Victoria Cross (This England, 1997)
