= Sher Bahadur Thapa =

Recipient of the Victoria Cross (1921–1944)

Sher Bahadur Thapa VC
- Born: 20 November 1921; Ghalechap, Jyamaruk, Tanahu district, Nepal
- Died: 19 September 1944 (aged 22); San Marino
- Burial place: Gurkha War Cemetery, Rimini
- Military career
- Allegiance: British India
- Branch: British Indian Army
- Service years: 1942-44 †
- Rank: Rifleman
- Units: 1st Battalion, 9th Gurkha Rifles
- Conflicts: World War II; Italian Campaign; Battle of San Marino †
- Awards: Victoria Cross

Sher Bahadur Thapa (Nepali: शेरबहादुर थापा) VC (20 November 1921 – 19 September 1944) was a Nepalese Gurkha recipient of the Victoria Cross, the highest and most prestigious award for gallantry in the face of the enemy that can be awarded to British and Commonwealth forces.

== Details ==
He belonged to the Thapa Chhetri of Lamichhane Thapa clan and was a son of Ramdhoj Thapa, a permanent resident of Ghalechap of Tanahu, Nepal. Thapa enlisted in the British Indian Army on 20 November 1942 and was a 22-year-old rifleman in the 1st Battalion of the 9th Gurkha Rifles during World War II, when the following deed took place at the Battle of San Marino, for which he was awarded the VC.

His citation in the London Gazette reads:

On 18/19 September 1944 at San Marino, Italy, when a company of the 9th Gurkha Rifles encountered bitter opposition from a German prepared position, Rifleman Sher Bahadur Thapa and his section commander, who was afterwards badly wounded, charged and silenced an enemy machine-gun. The rifleman then went on alone to the exposed part of a ridge where, ignoring a hail of bullets, he silenced more machine-guns, covered a withdrawal and rescued two wounded men before he was killed.

His Victoria Cross is currently held by his regiment 9 Gorkha Rifles.

== See also ==
- Thaman Gurung
- List of Brigade of Gurkhas recipients of the Victoria Cross
