= Andrew Scott (VC) =

- Born: 22 August 1840; Devon, England
- Died: 5 September 1882 (aged 42); Srinagar, British India
- Burial place: Kashmir Cemetery
- Military career
- Allegiance: United Kingdom
- Branch: British Indian Army
- Rank: Major
- Units: Bengal Staff Corps
- Conflicts: Balochistan Campaign; Second Anglo-Afghan War
- Awards: Victoria Cross

Major Andrew Scott VC (22 August 1840 – 5 September 1882) was an English recipient of the Victoria Cross, the highest and most prestigious award for gallantry in the face of the enemy that can be awarded to British and Commonwealth forces.

== Details ==
Scott was 36 years old, and a captain in the Bengal Staff Corps, British Indian Army during the Balochistan Campaign when the following deed took place for which he was awarded the VC.

On 26 July 1877 at Quetta, British India, Captain Scott was on duty at the regimental parade ground in the evening when he heard that British officers were being killed and immediately rushed to the rescue. He found one lieutenant cut down and another hard pressed and wounded but being protected by a sepoy. Captain Scott bayoneted two of the assailants and closed with a third, who fell with him to the ground and was killed by the sepoys of the regiment. This action saved the life of the wounded lieutenant.

He was killed in action at Srinagar, Kashmir, on 5 September 1882.

== Further information ==
He later achieved the rank of major.

== See also ==
- Monuments to Courage (David Harvey, 1999)
- The Register of the Victoria Cross (This England, 1997)
