= Frederick Barter =

Welsh Victoria Cross recipient (1891-1952)

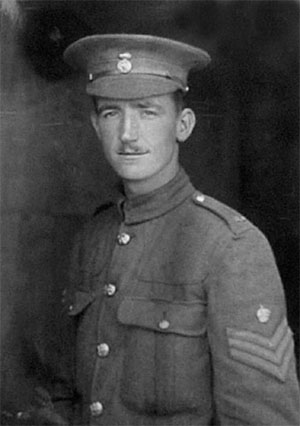
- Born: 17 January 1891; Cardiff, Glamorganshire, Wales
- Died: 15 May 1953 (aged 62); Poole, Dorset, England
- Military career
- Allegiance: United Kingdom
- Branch: British Army
- Service years: 1908-1922
- Rank: Company Sergeant Major
- Nickname: Fred
- Service number: 3902
- Units: Royal Welch Fusiliers
- Conflicts: World War I; Western Front; Second Battle of Artois; Battle of Festubert; Palestine; Action of Berukin
- Awards: Victoria Cross; Military Cross; Cross of St. George (Russia)

Captain Frederick Barter VC MC (17 January 1891 – 15 May 1953) was a British Army officer and a Welsh recipient of the Victoria Cross (VC), the highest and most prestigious award for gallantry in the face of the enemy that can be awarded to British and Commonwealth forces.

Frederick Barter was born in Cardiff. Whilst his elder brother John joined the army as a full-time Regular, Frederick joined as a part-time reservist, both men served with the Royal Welsh Fusiliers. In the autumn of 1914 Frederick was sent to reinforce the 1st Battalion, which had suffered many casualties, including his elder brother John amongst the dead.

He was commissioned as an officer in 1915 and served in France. The next year he returned to Britain to take up a post as an instructor in Shropshire. Later, he was transferred to the Gurkhas, and saw action in Palestine. During this campaign, one of his subordinates was decorated with the Victoria Cross, and he was decorated with the Military Cross. He retired from the army in 1922.

In the interwar years, he married, and was living and working in Middlesex. He served with the Home Guard during WW2. He died in a nursing home in Poole in 1953.

== Early life ==
He was born at 66 Minny Street, Cathays, Cardiff, the second eldest of the three sons and a daughter born to Mr Samuel and Mrs Emily Ann Barter. This address is on his baptism register entry, and the 1891 Wales census return. He and his grandparents lived in the same locality, at 158 Woodville Road, as at the time of the 1901 census. His initial education was at Crwys Road Board School in Cardiff.

Barter enlisted in the Royal Welsh Fusiliers (retitled in 1920 as the Royal Welch Fusiliers) on 4 December 1908, under Special Reserve terms of service of six years. After completing six months of full-time mandatory training he became a civilian and transferred to the Reserves, albeit on call until 3 December 1914. In 1911, he resided with his widowed father at 60 Daniel Street, Cathays, Cardiff, and was employed as a labourer. (His father resided at the same address in 1921, with his daughter Elizabeth and son-in-law.) His employment as a parcel porter with the Great Western Railway at Cardiff in February 1912 is documented in a surviving ledger. His youngest brother Robert also worked for the same employer as a porter, and continued to work there during the 1930s.

Before the war, Barter worked as a collier and later as a porter on the Great Western Railway. He was working as a stove repairer for the Cardiff Gas Light and Coke Company when the First World War broke out.

== Wartime Military service ==
On 5 August 1914, the day after the British declaration of war on Germany, Barter was mobilised for service. He and other reservists that had been mobilised were posted to the 3rd (Reserve) Battalion. This was a holding unit, and used as a pool of trained men who could be drafted and sent to the front as reinforcements. The 3rd (Reserve) Battalion was at Wrexham from August 1914 to May 1915.

The 1st Battalion landed at Zeebrugge on 7 October, and by the 30th of the month had been reduced to 86 men and one officer after heavy fighting at Zonnebeke and Zandvoorde. (One of the fatalities was his elder brother John.) To remedy this, a draft of reinforcements, including Barter, disembarked in France on 25 November 1914. He was a Sergeant at this time.

He was 24 years old, and a Company sergeant major when the following deed took place for which he was awarded the VC.

On 16 May 1915 at Festubert, France, Company Sergeant-Major Barter, when in the first line of German trenches, called for volunteers to enable him to extend our line, and with the eight men who responded, he attacked the German position with bombs, capturing three German officers, 102 men and 500 yards of their trenches. He subsequently found and cut 11 of the enemy's mine leads situated about 20 yards apart.

He was commissioned as a Second Lieutenant in the Special Reserve of Officers, with the Royal Welsh Fusiliers, with a seniority date of 26 August 1915. He continued to serve in France, but returned to take up the position of Instructor at the Western Command Bombing School, Prees Heath, Shropshire. His service as a temporary commissioned officer was from 26 August 1915 to 5 May 1917 inclusive, a duration of 1 year and 253 days.

In February 1917 he prepared to travel to India the following month, where he would be stationed at Kohat, on the North West Frontier. On 16 March 1917 he was seconded on probation with the Indian Army and was attached to the 4th Battalion, 3rd Queen Alexandra's Own Gurkha Rifles, with seniority as a Second Lieutenant of 26 May 1916. He was promoted to Lieutenant 26 May 1917. From 26 January 1918 he was attached to the 2nd Battalion. He was awarded the Military Cross, announced in the London Gazette dated 26 July 1918, for his gallantry on 12 March 1918 at Benat Burry. The MC citation reads as follows:

For conspicuous gallantry and devotion to duty when ordered to make a flank attack. He led his two platoons up a precipitous hill and turned the enemy's flank. Then, placing one platoon with two Lewis guns to command the enemy's line of retreat, he gallantly led an attack with the other platoon from the rear and flank, killing or capturing practically the whole garrison.

He was presented with his ribbon on 2 April 1918. His life was saved in the subsequent action on 10 April 1918 at El Kufr by Karanbahadur Rana Magar, who was awarded the Victoria Cross. Barter was invalided to England with fever in January 1919.

He received a permanent commission in the Indian Army on 6 May 1917, and promoted captain on 26 May 1920. He retired from the Indian Army on 5 November 1922.

During the Second World War, he served as a Major in the Home Guard (United Kingdom). He and his wife, who died in 1944, were living in Southall. He commanded a Company of 4th Middlesex Home Guard. He died in a nursing home in Poole, Dorset on 15 May 1953.

== Legacy ==
His VC is displayed at the Royal Welch Fusiliers Museum at Caernarfon Castle.

== Bibliography ==
=== Primary Sources ===
- The Quarterly Indian Army List for January 1920. Calcutta: Superintendent Government Printing. 1920.
- "Retirements with Gratuity, pp.1894-1900b". The Half Yearly Indian Army List for October 1923. Calcutta: Superintendent Government Printing. October 1923.
- "Part Two Supplement: War Services of Officers of the Army, etc, Gradation List of Officers of the British Army - Captains". The Quarterly Army List for July 1922. London: His Majesty's Stationery Office. 1922 – via Fold3.

=== Secondary Sources ===
- Batchelor, Peter; Matson, Christopher (1997). The Western Front 1915. VCs of the First World War. Stroud, Gloucestershire: Sutton Publishing Ltd. ISBN 978-0-7509-1980-7.
- Langley, David (June 2014). "British Line Infantry Reserves for the Great War - Part 1". Stand To! (100). The Western Front Association: 23–27.
- Langley, David (September 2014). "British Line Infantry Reserves for the Great War - Part 2". Stand To! (101). The Western Front Association: 27–31.
- Woodyatt, Maj.-Gen. Nigel G., ed. (1929). The Regimental History of the 3rd Queen Alexandra's Own Gurkha Rifles from April 1815 to December 1927.
