= Lalbahadur Thapa =

Nepali recipient of the Victoria Cross

Lalbahadur Thapa Magar VC
- Born: February 1906; Sumsa, W/No:6, Baglung, Dhawalagiri Anchaal, Nepal
- Died: 19 October 1968 (aged 62); Pakalihawa, Nepal
- Burial place: Pakalihawa Cemetery
- Military career
- Allegiance: British India
- Branch: British Indian Army
- Rank: Subedar-Major
- Units: 1st Battalion, 2nd Gurkha Rifles
- Conflicts: World War II; North African campaign
- Awards: Victoria Cross

Lalbahadur Thapa Magar VC (Nepali: लालबहादुर थापामगर; February 1906 – 19 October 1968) was a Nepali Gorkha recipient of the Victoria Cross, the highest and most prestigious award for gallantry in the face of the enemy that can be awarded to British and Commonwealth forces.

== Details ==
He was approximately 37 years old, and a Subedar in the 1st Battalion, 2nd Gurkha Rifles, in the Indian Army during World War II when the following deed took place for which he was awarded the VC.

On 5/6 April 1943 during the silent attack on Rass-es-Zouai, Tunisia, Subadar Lalbahadur Thapa, taking command of two sections, made his first contact with the enemy at the foot of a pathway winding up a narrow cleft which was thickly studded with enemy posts. The garrison of the out-posts was all killed by the subadar and his men, by kukri or bayonet and the next machine-gun posts were dealt with similarly. This officer then continued to fight his way up the bullet-swept approaches to the crest where he and the riflemen with him killed four - the rest fled. Thus secured, advance by the whole division was made possible.

He later achieved the rank of Subedar-Major

== The medal ==
His Victoria Cross is displayed at The Gurkha Museum in Winchester, Hampshire, England.

== See also ==
- List of Brigade of Gurkhas recipients of the Victoria Cross
