= Karanbahadur Rana Magar =

Recipient of the Victoria Cross

Karanbahadur Rana Magar VC
- Rana during the First World War
- Born: 21 December 1898; Mangalthan, Gulmi, Nepal
- Died: 25 July 1973 (aged 74); Litung, Nepal
- Military career
- Allegiance: British India
- Branch: British Indian Army
- Rank: Rifleman
- Units: 3rd Gurkha Rifles
- Conflicts: World War I
- Awards: Victoria Cross

Karanbahadur Rana Magar VC (21 December 1898 – 25 July 1973) was a Nepalese Gurkha recipient of the Victoria Cross, the highest and most prestigious award for gallantry in the face of the enemy that can be awarded to members of British and Commonwealth forces.

== Details ==
Karan Bahadur Rana was born in Litung, near Bharse, Gulmi district of Nepal, and belonged to the Magar tribe of Nepal. During the First World War he joined the 3rd Queen Alexandra's Own Gurkha Rifles of the British Indian Army, and was posted to the regiment's 2nd battalion, then serving with the 75th Division in Palestine.

On 9 April 1917, the British XXI Corps was on the coastal sector of Palestine just north of Jaffa with the 75th Division on the right of the corps. The British planned an operation which in several stages would capture Tulkarm. The 75th Division launched a preliminary attack at 05:10 hours on 9 April and met fierce resistance. On 10 April, in the fighting at El Kefr, Palestine, Rifleman Karanbahadur Rana, 2nd Battalion, 3rd Queen Alexandra's Own Gurkha Rifles, 75th Division, was awarded the Victoria Cross for most conspicuous bravery. The citation published on 21 June 1918 stated:

For most conspicuous bravery, resource in action under adverse conditions, and utter contempt for danger.

During an attack, he, with a few other men, succeeded under intense fire, in creeping forward with a Lewis gun in order to engage an enemy machine gun which had caused severe casualties to officers and other ranks who had attempted to put it out of action. No. 1 of the Lewis gun opened fire, and was shot immediately. Without a moment's hesitation Rifleman Karanbahadur pushed the dead man off the gun, and in spite of bombs thrown at him and heavy fire from both flanks, he opened fire and knocked out the enemy machine-gun crew; then, switching his fire on to the enemy bombers and riflemen in front of him, he silenced their fire. He kept his gun in action and showed the greatest coolness in removing defects which on two occasions prevented the gun from firing. During the remainder of the day he did magnificent work, and when a withdrawal was ordered he assisted with covering fire until the enemy were close on him. He displayed throughout a very high standard of valour and devotion to duty.:

The unit, date and place of VC actions were not gazetted from 1916 until 11 November 1918. These details were gazetted on 31 March 1919 when Karanbahadur Rana was listed with the '2/3rd Q.A.O. Gurkha Rif.', the date '10.4.18' and place 'El Kefr'. The gazette incorrectly stated El Kefr was in Egypt; it is in Palestine. In silencing the enemy machine-gun, Karanbahadur Rana, enabled his company commander, Lieutenant Frederick Barter, who had been lying within 30 yards of the machine gun for five and a half hours to withdraw. As a company sergeant-major with The Royal Welch Fusiliers, Lieutenant Barter had been awarded the Victoria Cross for conspicuous bravery at Festubert, France, on 16 May 1915.

At the end of two days of attacks, the offensive was called off.

Rana continued his military service after the war, serving in the 1919–1921 Waziristan campaign. He later returned to Nepal and died at Litung, Bharse Gulmi in Nepal on 25 July 1973, aged seventy-four.

== The medal ==
After his death, Rana's VC and other medals were obtained from one of his sons by the Gurkha Museum in Winchester, Hampshire, England, where they have been displayed since November 1974.

== See also ==
- List of Brigade of Gurkhas recipients of the Victoria Cross
