= Netrabahadur Thapa =

Nepalese Gurkha (1916 - 1944)

Netrabahadur Thapa Magar VC
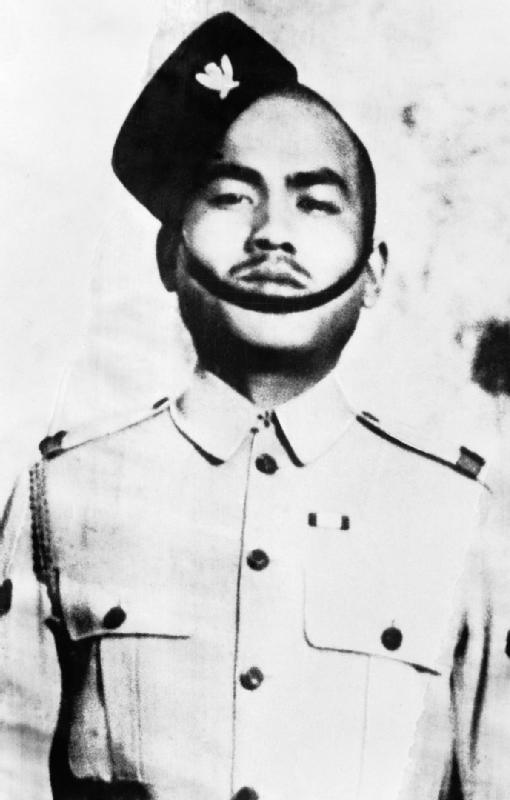
- Born: 8 January 1916; Rahu, Nepal
- Died: 26 June 1944 (aged 28); Bishenpur, India
- Military career
- Allegiance: British India
- Branch: British Indian Army
- Rank: Acting Subedar
- Units: 2nd Battalion, 5th Royal Gurkha Rifles
- Conflicts: World War II; Burma campaign †
- Awards: Victoria Cross

Netrabahadur Thapa Magar VC (Nepali: नेत्रबहादुर थापामगर 8 January 1916 – 26 June 1944) was a Nepalese Gurkha recipient of the Victoria Cross, the highest and most prestigious award for gallantry in the face of the enemy that can be awarded to British and Commonwealth forces.

== Details ==
On 25–26 June 1944, at the age of twenty eight, Magar was an acting subedar of the 2nd Battalion of the 5th Royal Gurkha Rifles in the Indian Army during World War II. He was in command of a small isolated hill post at Bishenpur, India when the Japanese army attacked in force. The men, inspired by their leader's example, held their ground and the enemy were beaten off, but casualties were very heavy and reinforcements were requested. When these arrived some hours later they also suffered heavy casualties. Thapa retrieved the reinforcements' ammunition himself and mounted an offensive with grenades and kukris, until he was killed.

== See also ==
- List of Brigade of Gurkhas recipients of the Victoria Cross
