= Gaje Ghale =

Recipient of the Victoria Cross (1922–2000)

Gaje Ghale VC
- Born: 1 August 1918; Barpak VDC, Gorkha District, Nepal
- Died: 28 March 2000 (aged 81)
- Military career
- Allegiance: British India; India
- Branch: British Indian Army; Indian Army
- Service years: 1936 - 1964
- Rank: Hon. Captain
- Units: 5th Royal Gurkha Rifles
- Conflicts: World War II
- Awards: Victoria Cross; Order of the Star of Nepal

Gaje Ghale (Nepali: गजे घले) VC (1 August 1918 – 28 March 2000) was a Nepalese Gurkha recipient of the Victoria Cross, the highest and most prestigious award for gallantry in the face of the enemy that can be awarded to British and Commonwealth forces.

== Biography ==
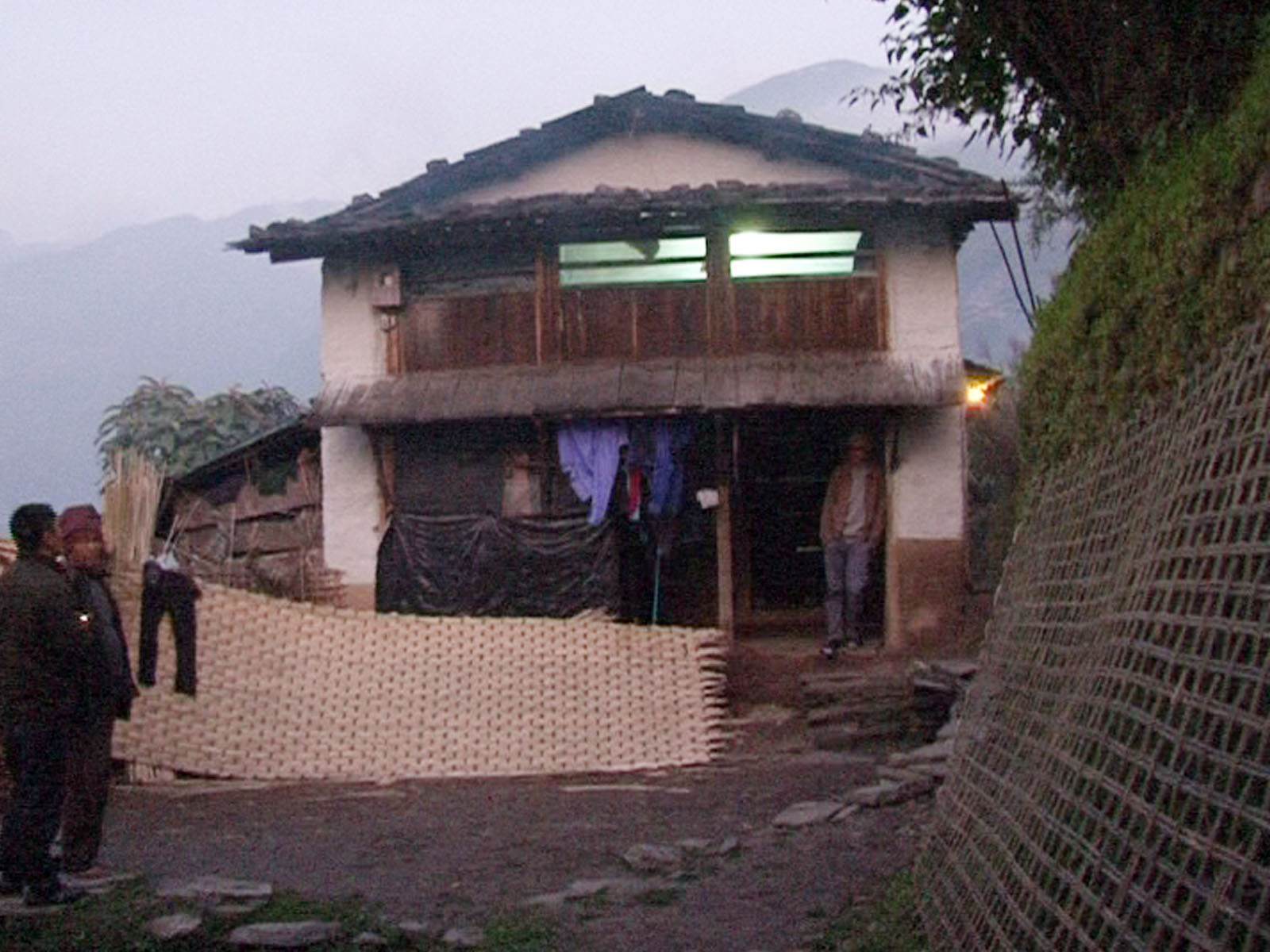
House of VC Gaje Ghale in Gorkha District, Nepal

Ghale was born in the Gorkha district of Nepal. He joined the British Indian Army in 1934. Ghale was 22 years old, and a Havildar in the 2nd Battalion of the 5th Royal Gurkha Rifles in the Indian Army during World War II when the following deed took place, for which he was awarded the VC. His medal citation reads:

The KING has been graciously pleased to approve the award of the VICTORIA CROSS to:-

No. 6816 Havildar Gaje Ghale, 5th Royal Gurkha Rifles (Frontier Force), Indian Army.

In order to stop an advance into the Chin Hills [then in Burma, now in Myanmar] of greatly superior Japanese forces it was essential to capture Basha East hill which was the key to the enemy position.

Two assaults had failed but a third assault was ordered to be carried out by two platoons of Havildar Gaje Ghale's company and two companies of another battalion.

Havildar Gaje Ghale was in command of one platoon: he had never been under fire before and the platoon consisted of young soldiers.

The approach for this platoon to their objective was along a narrow knife-edge with precipitous sides and bare of jungle whereas the enemy positions were well concealed. In places, the approach was no more than five yards wide and was covered by a dozen machine guns besides being subjected to artillery and mortar fire from the reverse slope of the hill.

While preparing for the attack the platoon came under heavy mortar fire but Havildar Gaje Ghale rallied them and led them forward.

Approaching to close range of the well-entrenched enemy, the platoon came under withering fire and this N.C.O. was wounded in the arm, chest and leg by an enemy hand grenade.

Without pausing to attend to his serious wounds and with no heed to the intensive fire from all sides, Havildar Gaje Ghale closed his men and led them to close grips with the enemy when a bitter hand to hand struggle ensued.

Havildar Gaje Ghale dominated the fight by his outstanding example of dauntless courage and superb leadership. Hurling hand grenades, covered in blood from his own neglected wounds, he led assault after assault by shouting the Gurkha's battle-cry.

Spurred on by the irresistible will of their leader to win, the platoon stormed and carried the hill by a magnificent all out effort and inflicted very heavy casualties on the Japanese.

Havildar Gaje Ghale then held and consolidated this hard won position under heavy fire and it was not until the consolidation was well in hand that he went, refusing help, to the Regimental Aid Post, when ordered to do so by an officer.

The courage, determination and leadership of this N.C.O. under the most trying conditions were beyond all praise.

Ghale was subsequently commissioned as a jemadar (war-substantive subedar) and continued to serve in the Indian Army post-1947. He was promoted substantive subedar on 20 February 1948, retiring as an Hon. Captain.

== See also ==
- List of Brigade of Gurkhas recipients of the Victoria Cross

== Notes ==
- Gaje Ghale, VC, The Times, 30 March 2000. Retrieved 10 October 2009.
