= Algernon Durand =

From the frontispiece of The Making of a Frontier

Algernon George Arnold Durand, CB, CIE (31 March 1854 – 8 October 1923) was a British soldier.

He was the third son of General Henry Marion Durand and younger brother of Edward, 1st Baronet Durand, and Mortimer.

He fought in the Second Anglo-Afghan War (1878–1880) at the Battle of Kandahar on 1 September 1880. He served as the district agent at Gilgit (1889–1894). In 1891, as a colonel, he commanded the successful Hunza–Nagar campaign, in which he was wounded. He wrote an account of the campaign, The Making of a Frontier, published in 1899. He was the military secretary to Lord Elgin, Viceroy of India (1894–1899), whose niece, Elizabeth, daughter of Thomas Charles Bruce, he married. He served at court as a Gentlemen at Arms. He was one of the founding members of the Central Asian Society in 1901.
