= Kulbir Thapa Magar =

Nepalese Gurkha recipient of the Victoria Cross

Kulbir Thapa Magar VC
- Born: 15 December 1888; Palpa, Nepal
- Died: 3 October 1956 (aged 67)
- Military career
- Allegiance: British India
- Branch: British Indian Army
- Rank: Havildar
- Units: 3rd Queen Alexandra's Own Gurkha Rifles
- Conflicts: World War I
- Awards: Victoria Cross

Kulbir Thapa Magar VC (15 December 1888 – 3 October 1956) was the first Nepalese Gurkha recipient of the Victoria Cross, the highest and most prestigious award for gallantry in the face of the enemy that can be awarded to British and Commonwealth forces.

== Biography ==
Born on 15 December 1888 in Palpa, Nepal, to Haria Gulte, Thapa was a 26-year-old Rifleman in the 2nd Battalion, 3rd Queen Alexandra's Own Gurkha Rifles, British Indian Army, during the First World War when the following deed took place for which he was awarded the Victoria Cross. On 25 September 1915 in Fauquissart, France Rifleman Kulbir Thapa, having been wounded himself, found a wounded soldier of The Leicestershire Regiment behind the first-line German trench (believed initially to be a 20-year-old soldier from Melton Mowbray by the name of Bill Keightley but since confirmed to be 19152 Private Evan Jones who received a letter from the Adjutant Captain B Dalton, of the 2nd Battalion Queen Alexandra's Own 3rd Gurkha Rifles, dated the 25th February 1916, requesting details of the action, that was made known in 2014 having been kept by the family together with a photograph of Kulbir Thapa for 99 years). Although urged to save himself, the Gurkha stayed with the wounded man all day and night. Early next day, in misty weather, he dragged him through the German wire, within spitting distance from the Germans, and, leaving him in a place of comparative safety, returned and brought in two wounded Gurkhas, one after the other. He then went back, and, in broad daylight, fetched the British soldier, carrying him most of the way under enemy fire.

The act of faith and courage attracted attention, and when he emerged from his trench for the third time with one more wounded comrade over his shoulder, the German soldiers clapped their hands to encourage the Gurkha on, however the Gurkha walked right across the No-Mans-Land back to his own side.

The Victoria Cross awarded to Kulbir Thapa was in the first group of awards for the Battle of Loos which were gazetted on 18 November 1915. Of the 18 VCs gazetted that day no less than 17 were presented by the King at Buckingham Palace in nine presentations between December 1915 and January 1917. Kulbir Thapa rejoined his battalion in Egypt on 4 January 1916 and did not receive his medal until a year later. The Governor-General of India, Lord Chelmsford, at a special parade on Tuesday, 30 January 1917, at the vice-regal lodge, Delhi, India, presented medals and orders to 200 Indian officers and men including the Victoria Cross to Rifleman Kulbir Thapa, 3rd Queen Alexandra's Own Gurkha Rifles, and two other Indian soldiers.

He later achieved the rank of Havildar.

== Legacy ==
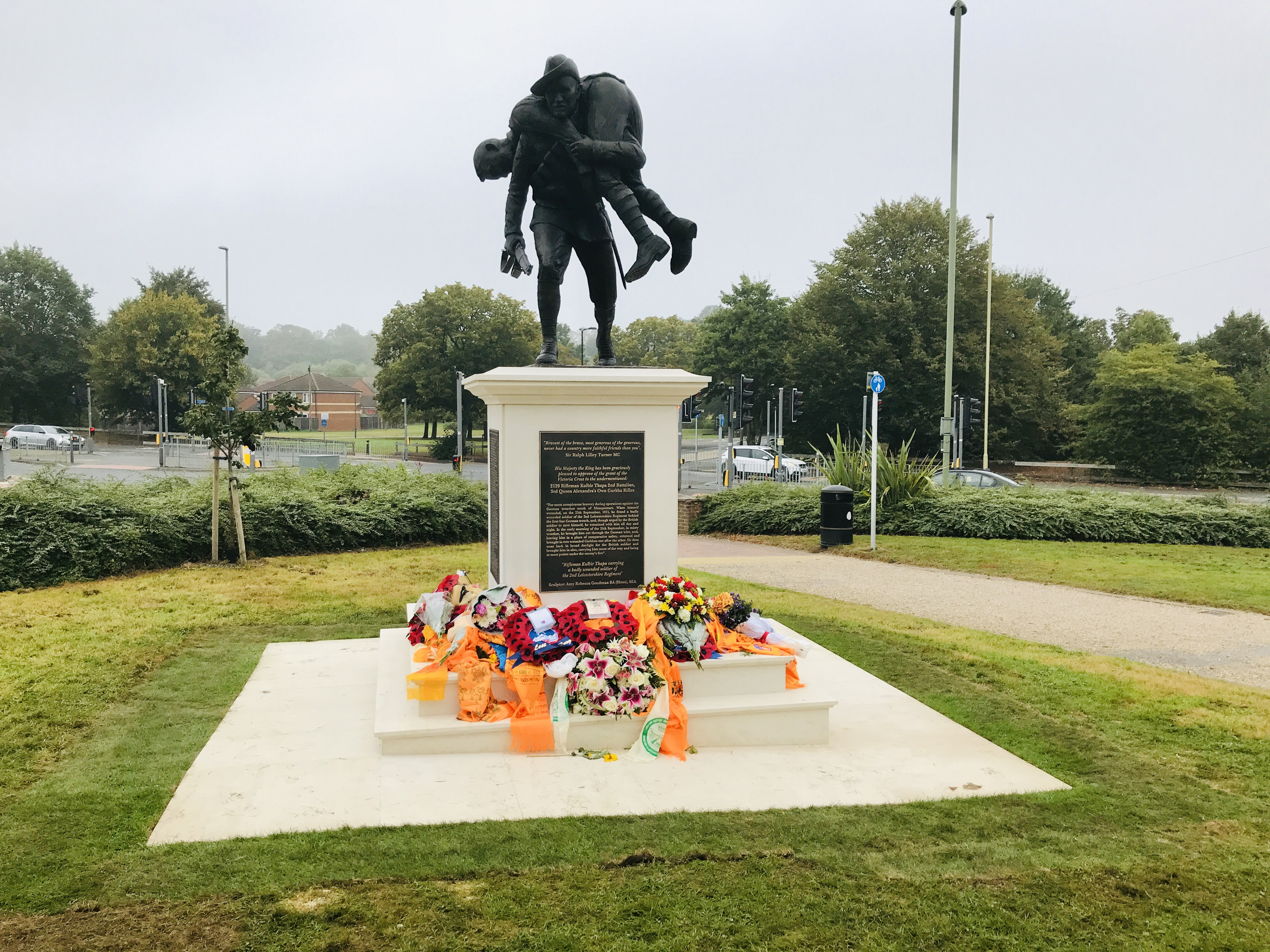
Statue of Kulbir Thapa in the action that was to win him the Victoria Cross in 1915

His Victoria Cross is displayed at The Gurkha Museum in Winchester, Hampshire, England. The Royal Mail issued a 1st class stamp featuring his portrait in their second set of six stamps marking anniversaries of the First World War in May 2015.

On 25 September 2021 a life-size bronze statue of Thapa carrying a wounded British soldier from the Leicestershire Regiment off the battlefield during World War One was unveiled in Princes Gardens in Aldershot in Hampshire. The memorial was commissioned by the Greater Rushmoor Nepali Community to highlight the bond between Nepal and Great Britain dating back more than two centuries. Funded by private donations, the £180,000 statue was created by Hampshire-based sculptor Amy Goodman.

=== In popular culture ===
- Gurkha: Beneath the Bravery, 2023 film is based on Thapa's life. Samir Gurung plays the role of Kulbir Thapa Magar.

== See also ==
- List of Brigade of Gurkhas recipients of the Victoria Cross
