= Dahakhani =

Village development committee in Bagmati Province, Nepal

दाहाखानी सुन्दर वस्ति Dahakhani
- Village development committee
- Nickname: दाहाखानी-७,चितवन
- Location in Nepal
- Coordinates: 27.77°N 84.55°E
- Country: Nepal
- Province: Bagmati Province
- District: Chitwan District

Government

Population (2011)
  - Total: 4,803
- Time zone: UTC+5:45 (Nepal Time)

Dahakhani is a village development committee in Chitwan District in Bagmati Province of southern Nepal. At the time of the 2011 Nepal census it had a population of 4,803 people (2,304 male; 2,499 female) living in 939 individual households.
