= Agansing Rai =

British Indian army officer (1920–2000)

Agansing Rai VC
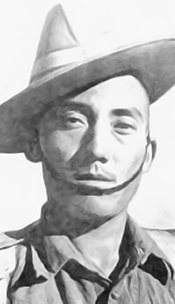
- Born: 24 April 1920; Amsara, Okhaldhunga district, Kingdom of Nepal
- Died: 27 May 2000 (aged 80); Kathmandu, Nepal
- Military career
- Allegiance: British India; India
- Branch: British Indian Army; Indian Army
- Rank: Honorary Captain
- Unit: 5th Royal Gurkha Rifles
- Conflicts: World War II
- Awards: Victoria Cross

Agansing Rai VC (24 April 1920 – 27 May 2000) was a Nepalese Gurkha recipient of the Victoria Cross, the highest and most prestigious award for gallantry in the face of the enemy that can be awarded to British and Commonwealth forces.

== Background ==
He was born in village development Diyale ward No.3 Aapashwara Toll, in the Okhaldhunga district of Nepal.

== Victoria Cross ==
Agansing Rai was a 24-year-old Naik in the 2nd Battalion, 5th Royal Gurkha Rifles, in the Indian Army during World War II, when he led his section in an attack on one of two posts which had been taken by the enemy and were threatening the British forces' communications on 26 June 1944 near the town of Bishenpur in the state of Manipur, India.

Under withering fire Agansing Rai and his party charged a machine-gun. Agansing Rai killed three of the crew. When the first position had been taken, he then led a dash on a machine-gun firing from the jungle, where he killed three of the crew, his men accounting for the rest. He subsequently tackled an isolated bunker single-handed, killing all four occupants. The enemy became so demoralised that they fled and the second post was recaptured.

== Further information ==
He later achieved the rank of Hon. Lieutenant after serving in the Indian Army. He died in Kathmandu.

Agansing Rai's VC group were sold at auction in 2004 and now form part of the Lord Ashcroft VC collection in the Imperial War Museum in London.

== See also ==
- List of Brigade of Gurkhas recipients of the Victoria Cross
