= Thaman Gurung =

British Indian army officer (1924–1944)

- Born: 2 October 1924; Singla, Nepal
- Died: 10 November 1944 (aged 20) near Modigliana, Emilia-Romagna, Italy
- Burial place: Rimini Gurkha War Cemetery, Rimini
- Military career
- Allegiance: British Indian Army
- Rank: Rifleman
- Unit: 1st Battalion 5th Royal Gurkha Rifles (Frontier Force)
- Conflicts: World War II; Italian campaign †
- Awards: Victoria Cross

Thaman Gurung VC (2 October 1924 – 10 November 1944) was a Nepalese Gurkha recipient of the Victoria Cross, the highest and most prestigious award for gallantry in the face of the enemy that can be awarded to British and Commonwealth forces.

== Details ==
He was 20 years old, and a Rifleman in the 1st Battalion, 5th Royal Gurkha Rifles (Frontier Force), in the Indian Army during World War II when the following deed took place for which he was awarded the VC.

The citation in the London Gazette reads:

In Italy on 10 November 1944 a Company of the 1st battalion 5th Royal Gurkha Rifles (Frontier Force) was ordered to send a fighting patrol on to Monte San Bartolo, an objective of a future attack. In this patrol were two scouts, one of whom was Rifleman Thaman Gurung.

By skillful stalking both scouts succeeded in reaching the base of the position undetected. Rifleman Thaman Gurung then started to work his way to the summit; the second scout attracted his attention to Germans in a slit trench just below the crest, who were preparing to fire with a machine gun at the leading section. Realizing that if the enemy succeeded in opening fire, the section would certainly sustain heavy casualties, Rifleman Thaman Gurung leapt to his feet and charged them. Completely taken by surprise, the Germans surrendered without opening fire.

Rifleman Thaman Gurung then crept forward to the summit of the position, from which he saw a party of Germans, well dug in on reverse slopes, preparing to throw grenades over the crest at the leading section. Although the sky-line was devoid of cover and under accurate machine gun fire at close range, Rifleman Thaman Gurung immediately crossed it, firing on the German position with his Tommy gun, thus allowing the forward section to reach the summit, but due to heavy fire from the enemy machine guns, the platoon was ordered to withdraw.

Rifleman Thaman Gurung then again crossed the sky-line alone and although in full view of the enemy and constantly exposed to heavy fire at short range, he methodically put burst after burst of Tommy gun fire into the German slit trenches, until his ammunition ran out. He then threw two grenades he had with him and rejoining his section, collected two more grenades and again doubled over the bullet-swept crest of the hill top and hurled them at the remaining Germans. This diversion enabled both rear sections to withdraw without further loss. Meanwhile, the leading section, which had remained behind to assist the withdrawal of the remainder of the platoon, was still on the summit, so Rifleman Thaman Gurung, shouting to the section to withdraw, seized a Bren gun and a number of magazines. He then, yet again, ran to the top of the hill and, although he well knew that his action meant almost certain death, stood up on the bullet-swept summit, in full view of the enemy, and opened fire at the nearest enemy positions. It was not until he had emptied two complete magazines, and the remaining section was well on its way to safety, that Rifleman Thaman Gurung was killed.

It was undoubtedly due to his superb gallantry that his platoon was able to withdraw from an extremely difficult position without many more casualties than were in fact incurred and that some very valuable information was obtained which resulted in the capture of the feature three days later. The rifleman's bravery cost him his life.

His medals are not publicly held.

== See also ==
- List of Brigade of Gurkhas recipients of the Victoria Cross
