= Monte San Bartolo =

Mountain in Italy

Coordinates: 43°55′13.727″N 12°53′43.5546″E

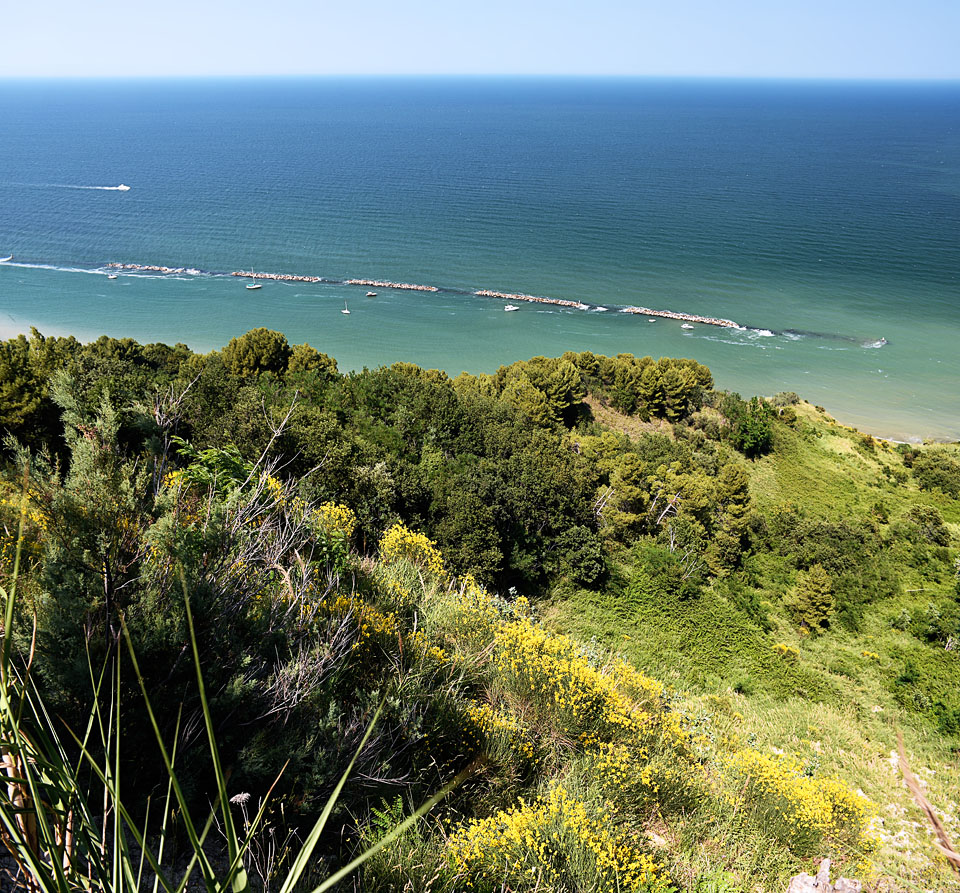
Monte San Bartolo

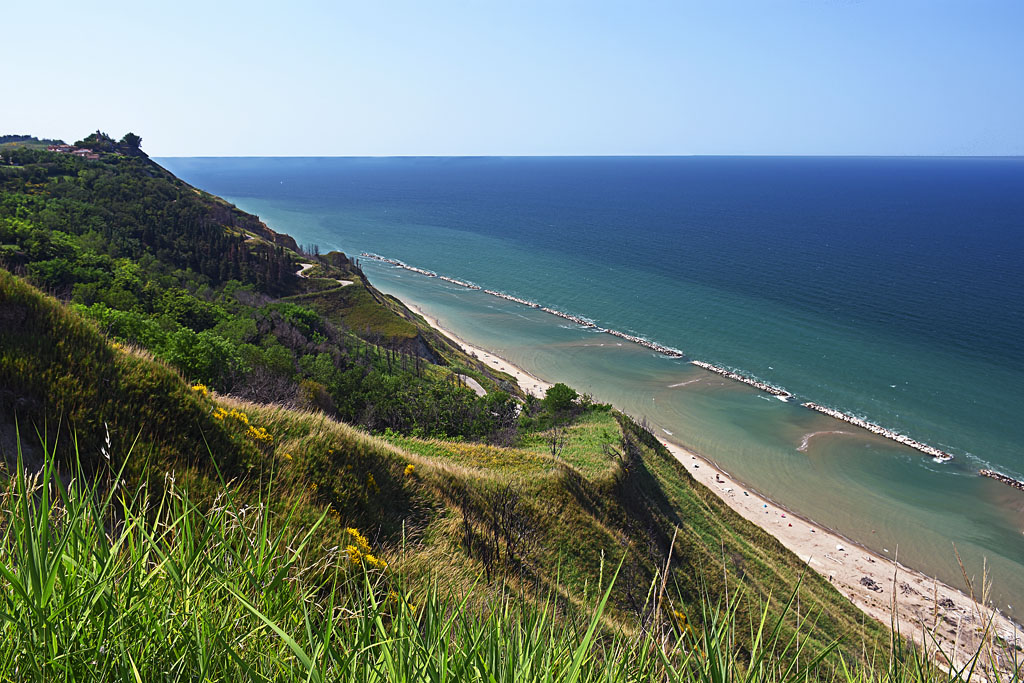
Fiorenzuola beach

Monte San Bartolo is a mountain located in the Marche region of Italy. The mountain forms part of the Parco naturale regionale del Monte San Bartolo, a regional park of Italy. The mountain forms the beginning of the coastal hill system in the centre of Italy. This system follows the beaches of the north Adriatic Sea.

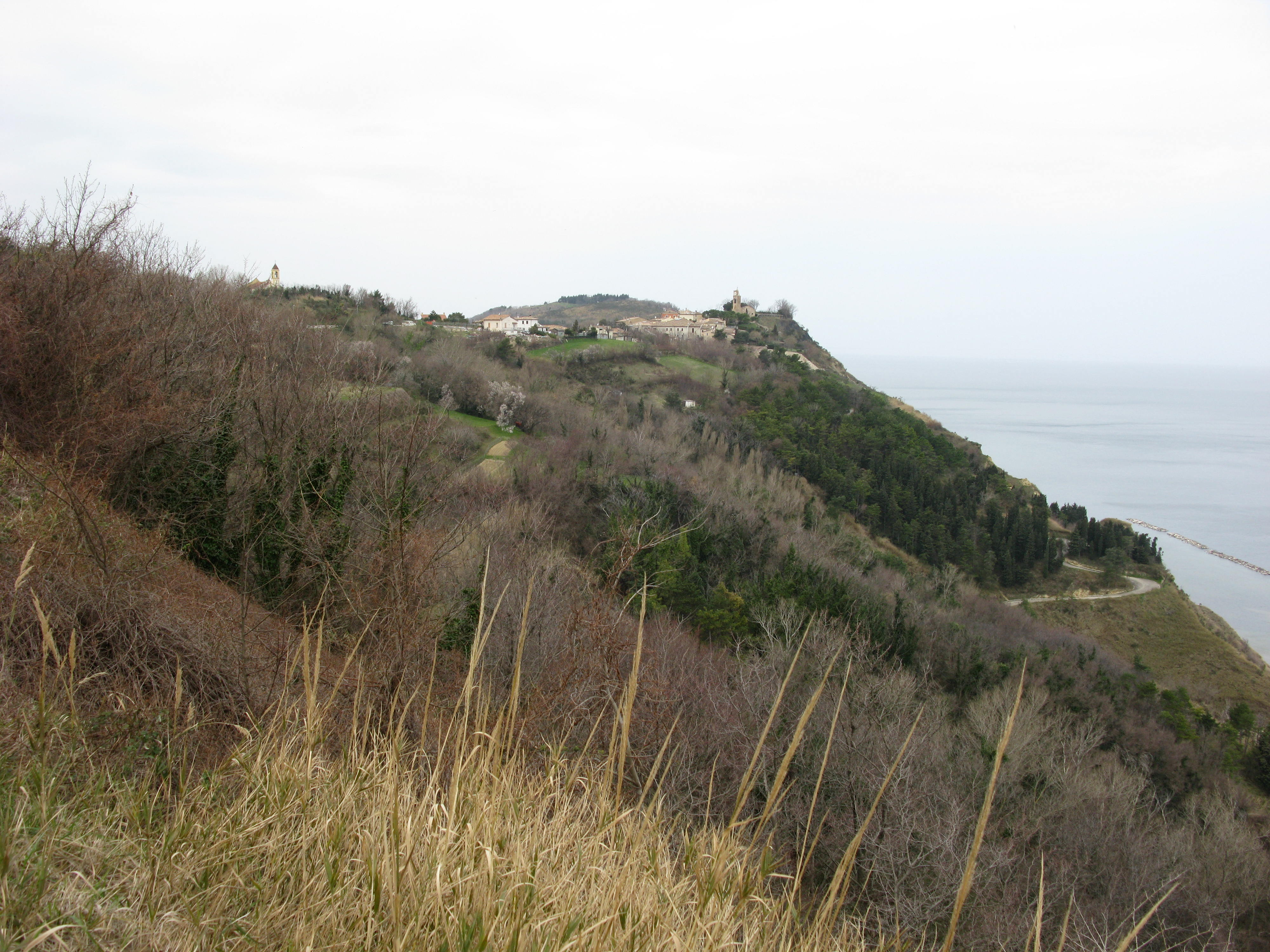
Monte San Bartolo

== General references ==
- Pages by the Park Authority on Parks.it
