= Hunza–Nagar Campaign =

1891 British military campaign

- Part of British colonisation of India and Anglo-Indian wars
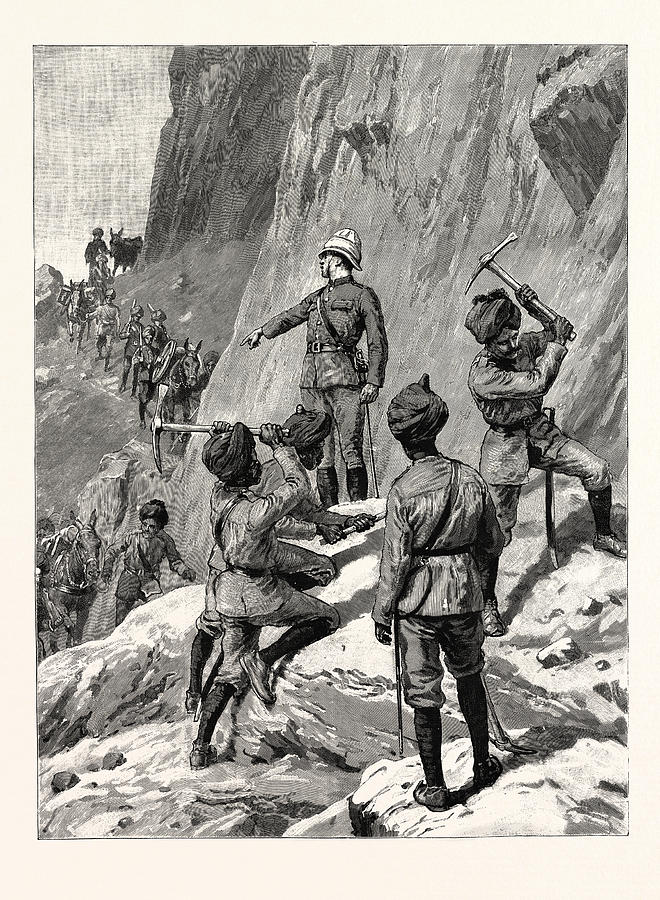
- The Fighting near Gilgit
Date	1891
Location	Hunza and Nagar
Result	British victory: All forts captured by British forces; Mirs of Hunza and Nagar flee to China; New rulers installed
Territorial changes	Submission of Hunza and Nagar to British suzerainty

Belligerents
Hunza; Nagar	(United Kingdom) British Empire: British Raj

Commanders and leaders
Safdar Ali Khan (Mir of Hunza); Raja Azur Khan (Mir of Nagar)	(United Kingdom) Algernon George Arnold Durand; (United Kingdom) Captain Aylmer; (United Kingdom) Lieutenant Bosiragon

Units involved
Hunza-Nagar forces	British Empire; India Imperial Service Troops: 5th Gurkhas; 20th Punjab Infantry; Bengal Sappers & Miners; 24th Hazara Mountain Battery (Frontier Force); Spedding's Pathans; Punial Levies

Strength
British estimates:-: 5,000	5th Gurkhas:-: 188; 20th Punjab Infantry:-: 28; 24th Hazara Mountain Battery:-: 2 Guns; Bengal sappers and Miners:-: 7; Kashmir Imperial Service Infantry:-: 661; Speddings Pathans:-: 200; Punali levies:-: 150; Total:-: 1,000 riflemen

Casualties and losses
Hunza-Nagar sources:- 100+ 127 captured	Hunza-Nagar sources:- 54+

The Hunza-Nagar Campaign was an armed conflict in 1891 fought by troops serving the British Raj against the princely states of Hunza and Nagar in the Gilgit Agency (now part of the Gilgit-Baltistan region in Pakistan). It is also known in Pakistan as the Anglo-Brusho War or Jangir-e-Lae.

== Prelude ==
Colonel Algernon George Arnold Durand, the British Political Administrator of the Gilgit Agency, undertook measures to strengthen British influence in the region. These efforts, aimed at furthering British strategic interests, involved infrastructure development initiatives such as road, telegraph, and mail system improvements. All the while, Durand maintained communication with the Mir of Gilgit. (Note: Mir is a title which is derived from the Arabic word Amir or Emir, which means a leader of a group or tribe.) Notably, Durand initiated the improvement of the road connecting Kashmir to the Russian frontier, which passed through Hunza and Nagar. The rulers of these two states perceived these developments as a potential threat to their previously enjoyed isolation.

Following the establishment of the Gilgit Agency in 1889, the British moved to consolidate their influence in the region. This included efforts to secure the borders with neighboring states such as Nagar and Hunza. In 1890, tensions arose when the British reinforced Chalt Fort near the border, citing reports of potential attacks from forces associated with Nagar and Hunza. They also continued to improve the road leading to the fort. In May 1891, representatives from Nagar and Hunza demanded the British cease roadwork and withdraw from the fort, which they claimed was on their territory. Algernon Durand maintained the fort's reinforcement and accelerated road construction. Nagar and Hunza viewed Durand's actions as an escalation and blocked mail from the British Resident in Chinese Turkmenistan from passing through their territory. British India interpreted this as a violation of the 1889 agreement with Hunza, specifically the clause guaranteeing free passage of mail. After issuing an ultimatum that was ignored, they initiated the Anglo-Brusho Campaign of 1891.

== Developments ==
In November 1891, under Colonel Algernon Durand's command, a force of approximately 1,000 troops assembled in Gilgit. Composed primarily of Gurkhas, Dogras, and Kashmiri soldiers, the force prepared for a northward advance towards Hunza and Nagar. The operation was conducted with secrecy. During their journey, they captured an individual suspected of acting as a spy for the Hunza Mir. After being interrogated by Durand's advisors, the individual reportedly revealed an alternative strategy: a surprise attack on the Chalt garrison involving Hunza fighters disguised as Gilgiti porters carrying supplies. These disguised individuals would gain entry to the fort and initiate an attack, allowing other Hunza forces to exploit the opportunity and breach the defenses.

In response to the situation in Hunza and Nagar, Algernon Durand assembled a combined force of approximately 1,000 Gurkhas and Kashmiris, along with several hundred Pathan road builders, a mountain artillery battery, 16 British officers, and 7 engineers. The challenging terrain significantly slowed the British force's progress, taking them a week to reach Chalt, their designated operations base situated only 32 kilometers (20 miles) north of Gilgit.

Durand received a message from Safdar Ali:

Chalt is even more precious to us than the strings of our wives pyjamas

In response to the British ultimatums, Safdar Ali, the Khan of Hunza, demanded the return of Chalt, a disputed territory. He warned Algernon Durand, the British political agent, that any British incursion into Hunza would face resistance not only from Hunza but also potentially from China and Russia. Safdar Ali asserted that he had secured Russian support against the British, whom he characterized as militarily weaker. Additionally, reports from Kashgar indicated that he had sought financial and military aid from both the Russian consul and the Chinese governor.

On November 29th, Algernon Durand, the British political agent, issued ultimatums to Raja Azur, Khan of Nagar, and Safdar Ali, Khan of Hunza. These ultimatums cited British concerns about Russian activities in the Pamirs region and the need to secure passage through Hunza and Nagar to address the situation. They also emphasized the British desire to maintain the existing political structure and avoid interference in the internal affairs of the two states.

== Campaign ==
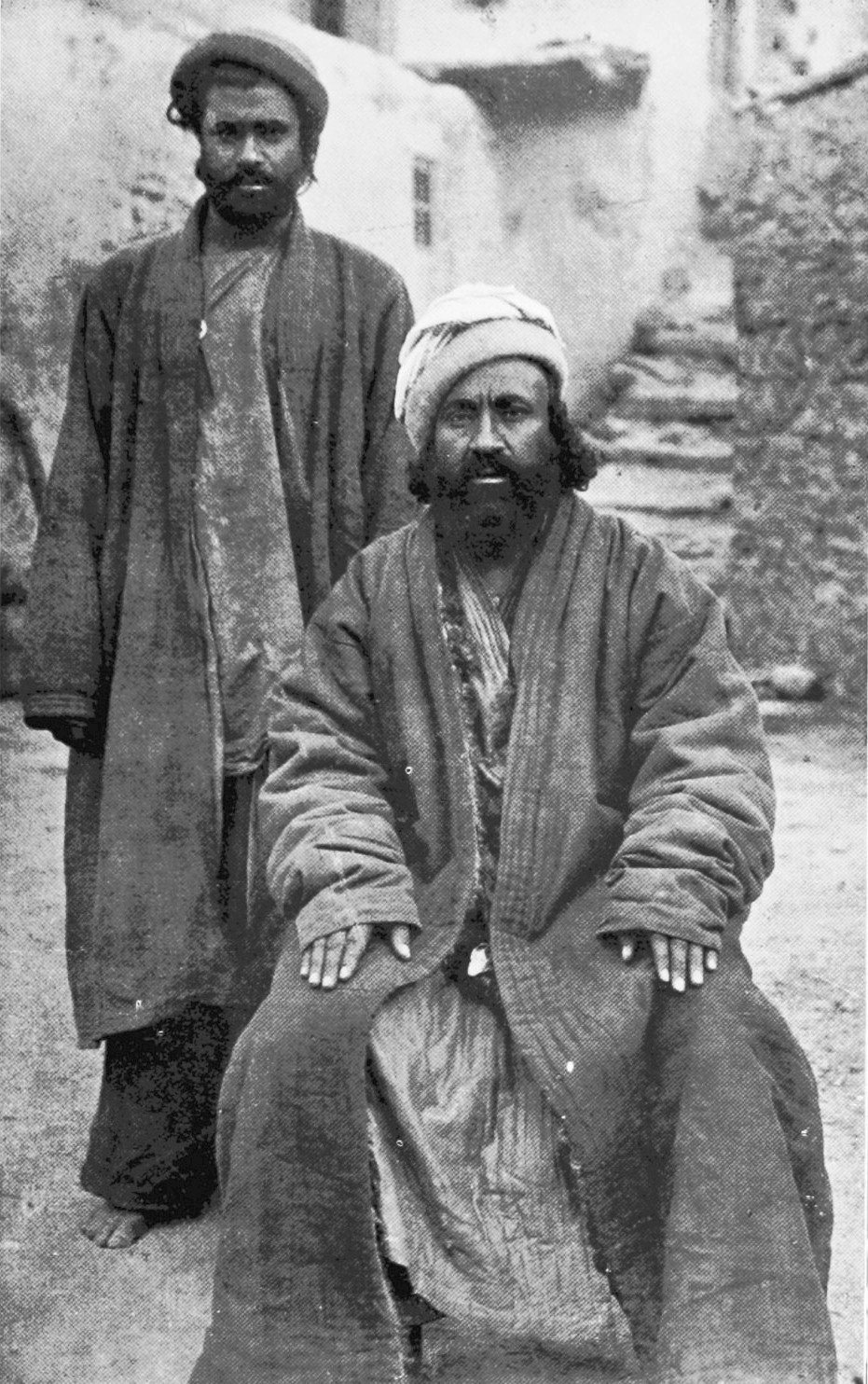
Mir of Nagar, Raja Azur Khan (also commander of lashkar forces)

=== Failed Attempt to take Chalt fort ===
In the spring of 1891, while stationed in Gilgit, Algernon Durand received reports that Safdar Ali, the Khan of Hunza, was planning an attack on a Kashmiri fort. These reports came shortly after news of Yanov's (Note: Yavnov was a Russian colonel who threatened the British officer and barred him from returning through Afghan territory to Gilgit because Pamir was claimed by Russia as part of its territory.) arrival in northern Hunza, leading to speculation about a possible link between the events.

Algernon Durand responded to this attempt by dispatching soldiers to dismantle Hunza-controlled rope bridges and bolstering the Kashmiri garrison. Recognizing the potential for another attempt by Safdar Ali, possibly with Russian support, he remained vigilant. Safdar Ali subsequently succeeded in convincing the ruler of the relatively small state of Nagar to join him in resisting the British and their Kashmiri allies.

=== Siege of Nilt fort ===
On December 1st, the British military campaign commenced. Following orders from Algernon Durand, engineers constructed a temporary bridge across the Hunza River, enabling the force to advance. Their objective was the mountain capital of Safdar Ali, Baltit (formerly known solely as Hunza). The troops encountered significant challenges during their advance. They navigated nearly vertical climbs and descents through a series of steep canyons, facing sustained gunfire from Hunza-Nagar sharpshooters positioned in fortified structures called "sangars" (Note: Sangar is fortification which is a term for a small temporary fortified position made up of stone or built of sandbags and similar materials.) located atop caves or rock formations. The first major obstacle they encountered was the stone fort of Nilt, belonging to the king of Nagar.

The Asian castle, known for its durable construction, featured thick walls pierced only by tiny arrow slits. Algernon Durand's seven-pounder mountain guns, small cannons designed for mountain warfare, had limited impact against these defenses. Gurkha marksmen faced difficulty targeting defenders positioned within the narrow openings, a defensive feature strategically designed by the Hunza and Nagar forces. After being injured and encountering a jammed machine gun, Durand relinquished command. He ordered sappers, under Captain Fenton Aylmer, to breach the main gate with explosives. Supported by covering fire, Captain Aylmer, his orderly Pathan, and two subalterns approached the fortress wall and successfully dislodged defenders from their positions.

Captain Aylmer, along with his soldiers, used their firearms at close range through the narrow openings in the gate. Under heavy gunfire, they rushed towards the base of the main gate carrying explosive charges. The charges were attached to the gate and secured with stones. After initiating the detonation sequence, Aylmer and another soldier retreated to a safe distance. However, the initial attempt was unsuccessful. Despite sustaining a leg wound and powder burns, Aylmer returned to the gate and attempted to relight the malfunctioning fuse. He faced further attacks from the opposing forces, resulting in severe hand injuries. Aylmer retreated to cover once more and waited for the detonation. The second attempt with the fuse was successful.

Knight quoted:-

We heard a tremendous explosion above the din of guns and musketry, and perceived volumes of smoke rising high into the air

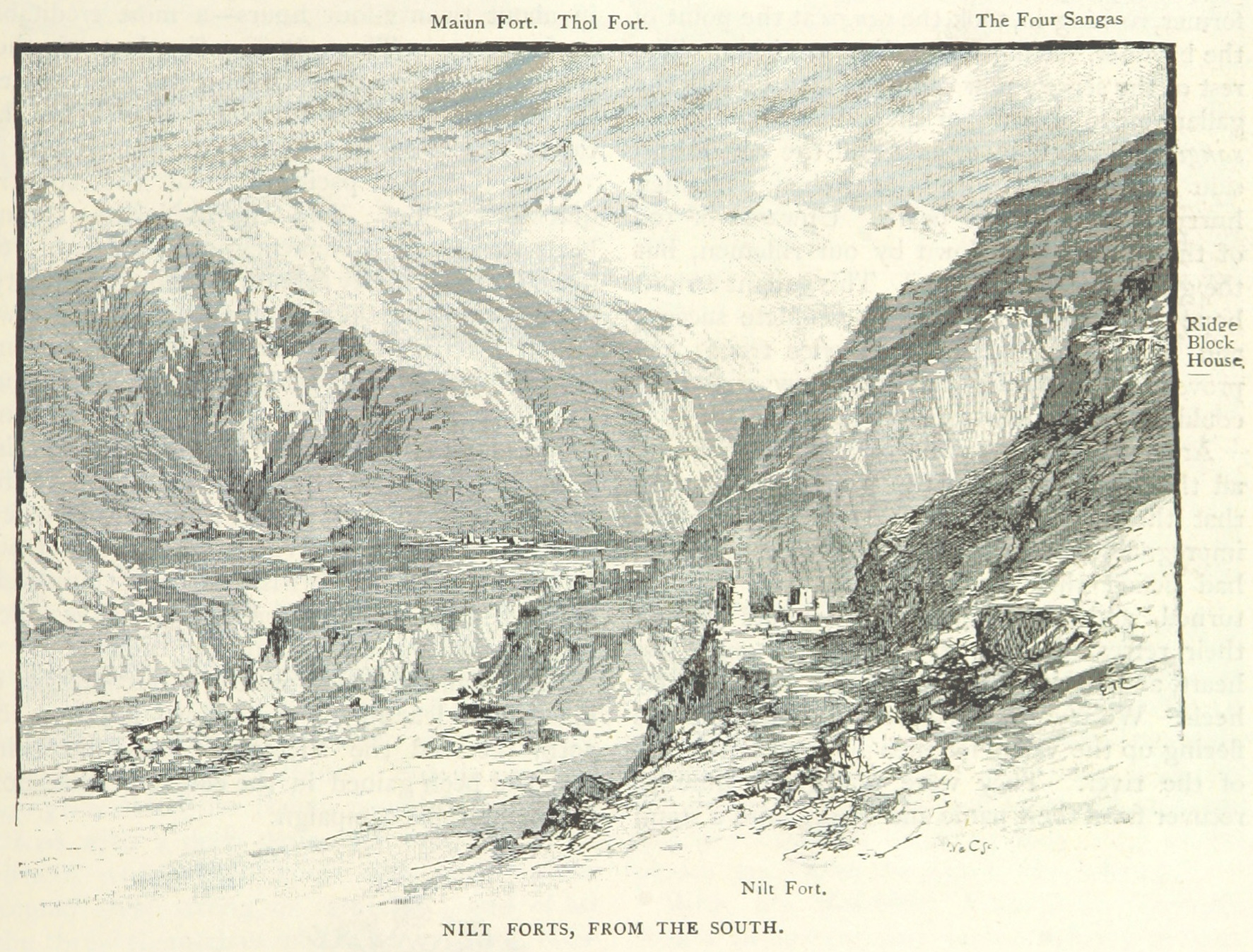
The forts at Nilt

The explosion breached the doorway, creating a large cloud of dust and debris. Aylmer, his two subalterns, and Gurkha soldiers rushed into the fort, where close-quarters combat erupted. The attacking force faced challenges. Disoriented by the smoke and confusion following the detonation, the Gurkhas became caught in crossfire. Blinded by the smoke and misled by the sounds of battle, the main force continued firing upon the fort, drawing return fire. Lieutenant Boisragon crossed enemy lines to request support. The arrival of reinforcements shifted the battle's course and secured the stronghold.

Initially obscured by smoke, the Hunza-Nagar forces soon realized that the battle had shifted inside the fort, while those remaining outside were unaware. Hearing cheers from within, they joined in with breathless support. Upon reaching a vantage point, they witnessed forces pouring through the gate, forcing the defenders to flee through hidden exits. The Nilt Fortress fell, with the British suffering six casualties compared to significantly higher losses on the Hunza-Nagar side. Later, Knight would meet Aylmer. Despite their initial defeat at Nilt, Hunza-Nagar forces continued to resist the invaders as they advanced towards the Hunza capital. In mid-December, they encountered an obstacle more formidable than the Nilt Fort.

=== Sieges of fortress at Thol and Maiun ===
On December 2nd, Captain Bradshaw led an attempt to rebuild the road across the Nilt Nala, aiming to attack the Nagari fortress of Thol on the opposite side. However, they encountered heavy gunfire from Hunza-Nagar forces and were compelled to retreat. Spedding's Pathans, initially shielded, also faced intense fire and were subsequently recalled. Another attack attempt on December 3rd proved unsuccessful. The British forces found themselves in a tense stalemate against the well-armed Hunza-Nagar troops stationed within the mountainous Hunza valley. Fortified positions made a direct assault nearly impossible. As winter approached and concerns regarding the impact on nearby tribes grew, the British forces opted for a siege strategy. They strengthened their own position and prepared for a protracted wait, engaging in daily skirmishes and reconnaissance to identify potential weaknesses. Estimates suggest the fort was garrisoned by around 400 Lashkars.

A reconnaissance mission attempted on December 8th proved unsuccessful. British forces planned a surprise attack on the Hunza-Nagar forces stationed at Nilt Nala on the same day. However, the attack was abandoned due to strong enemy fortifications and high casualties sustained during the initial assault. Pinned down by heavy fire, the British troops withdrew safely under the cover of nightfall. On December 9th, further reconnaissance missions and attacks were unsuccessful. However, they managed to establish observation posts to engage the enemy Lashkars. A Dogra soldier discovered a potential weakness in the Hunza-Nagar position: a steep slope inaccessible to their defensive fire. Meanwhile, maintaining supply lines for the British forces became increasingly challenging. In Captain Bradshaw's absence, Captain Mackenzie assumed command and decided to restrict the circulation of information within the camp regarding the planned attack. This decision aimed to prevent knowledge of the plan reaching the Hunza-Nagar forces.

Under the cloak of darkness, 50 Gurkhas and 50 Dogra soldiers scaled the Nilt Nala undetected by the Hunza-Nagar defenders. At dawn, supporting troops initiated a distracting attack, drawing heavy fire from the Hunza-Nagar forces.

Led by the Gurkhas, the attacking force scaled the 1,200-foot cliff, achieving a momentary element of surprise against the Hunza-Nagar fighters. The defenders responded by throwing rocks down the steep slope, but these attempts proved ineffective. The attackers successfully reached a position near the sangars, outflanking the defenders and forcing them to retreat.

Moving swiftly, the attackers repaired the road and pursued the retreating forces. Unable to escape, particularly near the first sangar on the road to Thol, the defenders surrendered their weapons. The attackers captured 92 Hunza-Nagar soldiers, along with their rifles (primarily Snider-Enfields), a supply of government-issued Dum-dum bullets, and various other weapons.

==== Capture of Thol and Baltit fort ====
Following the fall of Thol Fort, Khan of Nagar Raja Azur and Raja of Hunza Azur Khan retreated to Chinese Turkestan without opposition. On 23 December, the British Raj took control of the Baltit Fort.

== Aftermath ==
The pursuit continued, leading to the infantry's capture of Nagar on the same day. As the British forces advanced, both Nagari and Hunza fighters surrendered. The Mir of Nagar remained in his city and was subsequently arrested, while the Mir of Hunza chose to flee and abandon his people. Dissatisfied with their leader's actions, the Hunzas informed British officers that they had sent forces in pursuit of him. Following the Mir of Hunza's departure, under leadership of Wazir Khurram Shah (Trangfa Ganish) along with other notables negotiatied with the British Officers and thus Hunza was captured without further resistance and bloodshed on December 22nd. Within its fort, British forces discovered a vast arsenal of weapons and ammunition manufactured in Britain, Russia, France, and Belgium, along with stockpiles of locally produced gunpowder. Algernon Durand's column returned to Gilgit on January 11, 1892.

British forces attempted to capture Safdar Ali, and with the assistance of locals, many of his followers deserted him. Consequently, he was forced to flee across the border into China. Nazim Khan and Zafar Khan were installed as the new rulers of Hunza and Nagar, respectively. The regions brought under British control maintained loyalty to the British Indian government and retained a degree of autonomy under British rule. They provided valuable services during the Chitral expedition.

== Legacy ==
In the early 1900s, the British constructed an all-weather pony track connecting Gilgit to Skardu in Baltistan, which was under separate Dogra rule. This construction aimed to improve access to the Gilgit Agency for trade and communication purposes. However, Baltistan remained under independent political and administrative control.

While the Hunza-Nagar campaign (now part of Gilgit-Baltistan) brought a period of peace, the legacy of British rule and the subsequent partition of British India have contributed to ongoing disputes and tensions between India and Pakistan over the region. The area's complex history, including pre-existing territorial claims and local dynamics, plays a significant role in the current situation.

== Awards ==
The British awarded three Victoria Crosses during this campaign.

== See also ==
- Francis Younghusband
- The Great Game
- Jangir-e-Lae

== Notes ==
Note's:-

Reference's:-

== Bibliography ==
- Blood, Peter R. (December 1996). Pakistan A Country Study. DIANE Publishing Company. ISBN 9780788136313.
- Forbes, Archibald; Henty, George Alfred; Griffiths, Arthur (1896). Battles of the Nineteenth Century Volume 1. Cassell. ISBN 9781298820389.
- Hopkirk, Peter (2001). The Great Game On Secret Service in High Asia. Oxford University Press (published 10 May 1990). ISBN 9780192802323.
- Huttenback, Robert A. (1975). "The 'Great Game' in the Pamirs and the Hindu-Kush: The British Conquest of Hunza and Nagar". Modern Asian Studies. 9 (1): 1–29. doi:10.1017/S0026749X00004856. JSTOR 311795.
- John Keay, The Gilgit Game: The Explorers of the Western Himalayas 1865–95 (1994) Oxford University Press
- Knight, Edward Frederick (2001) [1893]. Where Three Empires Meet A Narrative of Recent Travel in Kashmir, Western Tibet, Gilgit, and the Adjoining Countries (Hardcover). Longmans, Green, and Company (published 21 November 2007). ISBN 9789694023298. The author was a volunteer participant in the campaign, and the back half of the book contains a detailed description
- Nevill, Hugh Lewis (1912). Campaigns on the North-west Frontier. J. Murray. ISBN 9780342594405.
- Sadler, John (2023). The Gurkha Way A New History of the Gurkhas. Pen and Sword. ISBN 9781399068277.
- Singh, K. Brahma (2010) [first published Lancer International 1990], History of Jammu and Kashmir Rifles, 1820-1956: The State Force Background (PDF), brahmasingh.co.nf, ISBN 978-81-7062-091-4, archived from the original (PDF) on 2016-03-06
- Welsh, Charles (editor), Famous Battles of the Nineteenth Century, (1905), (Wessels).
- Wright, Robert (2023). "Hunza and the Raj. British Involvement in the Karakoram Mountains 1876 -1946. Including the life of Sir Muhammad Nazim Khan, KCIE". 2023, Hunza and the Raj. Second Edition. Second edition – via academia.edu.
- Haines, Chad (March 13, 2012). Nation, Territory, and Globalization in Pakistan Traversing the Margins (ebook). Taylor & Francis. ISBN 9781136449970.
- Hussain, Shafqat (April 28, 2015). Remoteness and Modernity Transformation and Continuity in Northern Pakistan (ebook). Yale University Press. ISBN 9780300213355.

Preceded by Miranzai Expeditions (1891)	Military history of the North-West Frontier	Succeeded by Chitral Expedition 1895
