= Tamandu =

- Location in Burma
- Coordinates: 19°51′N 93°47′E
- Country: Burma
- Division: Rakhine State
- District: Kyaukpyu
- Township: Ann Township
- Time zone: UTC+6.30 (MST)

Tamandu was a village in Ann Township, Kyaukpyu District, in northern Rakhine State in the westernmost part of Myanmar. Tamandu was located on the southside of the Dalet River (Dalet Chaung) just after it passes through the Kolonzin Range of hills and on the edge of the delta. As of 2010, Tamandu no longer exists; the area is now part of Zuklaing Village Tract.

== History ==
During World War II the Japanese maintained a strategic supply base at Tamandu. It was retaken by the 25th Infantry Division (India) and the 82nd (West Africa) Division in March 1945 as part of the Arakan Campaign, and a number of short documentary films were made there that year. The Tamandu Barracks in Lagos, Nigeria and Tamandu Road in Kano, Nigeria were named after the village.
