= Nilt =

- Location within Gilgit Baltistan
- Coordinates: 36.15°N 74.25°E
- Country: Pakistan
- Province: Gilgit–Baltistan
- Elevation: 2,260 m (7,410 ft)
- Time zone: UTC+5 (PST)

Nilt is a town in Nagar District, Gilgit–Baltistan, Pakistan. It is located at 36°15'0N 74°25'0E with an elevation of 2260 metres (7417 feet).

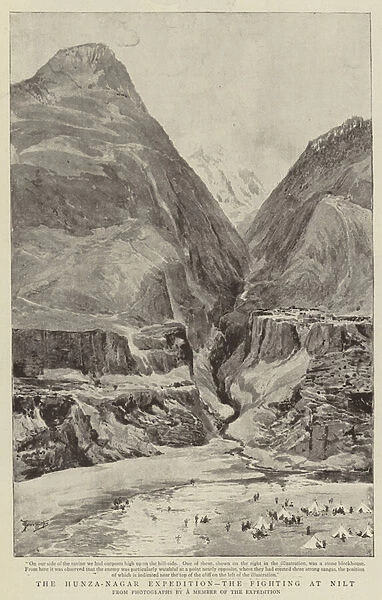
The Hunza-Nagar Expedition, the fighting at Nilt. The Graphic 1892

This area was conquered by the British in 1891 as part of the Hunza-Nagar Campaign.
