= Indian Staff Corps =

Branch of the British Indian Army

The Indian Staff Corps was a branch of the Indian Army during the British Raj. Separate Staff Corps were formed in 1861 for the Bengal, Madras and Bombay Armies, which were later combined into the Indian Army. They were meant to provide officers for the native regiments and for the staff and army departments. They were also designed to offer placements for civil and political appointments for posts which Indian Army officers might be eligible. Those officers who were already employed by the Army had the option to join the Staff Corps or to stay employed under the old conditions of service. In that sense, the Indian Staff Corps was seen by the majority of entrants as synonymous with the Regular Officer Corps of the Indian Armies. This is not to be confused with officers holding staff appointments.

To reduce confusion, the term "Indian Staff Corps" in relation to officers on regimental duty was withdrawn by Lord Kitchener during his unification of the Indian Army. From 1903, officers were gazetted to the "Indian Army".

== Victoria Cross recipients ==
- Guy Boisragon
- Charles Grant
- Francis Maxwell
- Charles Melliss
- John Smith
