= Spurgin =

Spurgin is a surname. Notable people with the surname include:

- Clare Spurgin (1897–1986), British lay magistrate and youth justice activist
- John Spurgin (1796–1866), English physician
- John Blick Spurgin (1821–1903), British army officer
- Pat Pitney (née Spurgin; born 1965), American university administrator and Olympic gold medalist
- William F. Spurgin (1838–1904), American military officer

== See also ==
- Spurgin Residence, historic residence in Iowa
