= Robert Vivian =

British military officer

General Sir Robert Vivian GCB
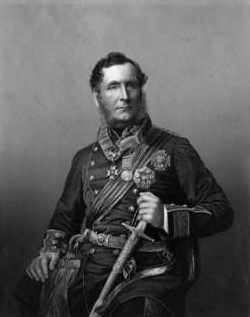
- General Sir Robert Vivian, c. 1880
- Born: 1802; Arundel, Sussex, England
- Died: 3 May 1887 (aged 84–85); Brighton
- Military career
- Allegiance: United Kingdom
- Branch: British Indian Army
- Rank: General
- Conflicts: First Anglo-Burmese War; Crimean War
- Awards: Knight Grand Cross of the Order of the Bath

General Sir Robert John Hussey Vivian (1802 – 3 May 1887) was a British officer in the Madras infantry from the Vivian family.

== Life ==
He was the natural son of Sir Hussey Vivian, 1st Baron Vivian. He was born in 1802 and was brought up as one of the family. He was educated at Burney's school at Gosport, entered the East India Company's army as ensign on 12 June 1819, and the following day was promoted to be lieutenant in the 10th native infantry. He arrived at Madras on 8 July 1819, returned home on furlough in January 1821, and on landing again in India on 15 June 1822 joined his regiment at Belgaon. He was appointed adjutant of the second battalion on 14 March 1823, and in the following year was posted to the 18th Madras native infantry for service in Burma under Sir Archibald Campbell.

Vivian took part in the capture and occupation of Rangoon in May 1824, was made adjutant of the battalion on 4 June, and was engaged in the assaults of Yelgeo and Juzong, in the attack and capture on 10 June of Kamandin, in the repulse of the attack on the lines in front of Rangoon on 1 July, and in the subsequent fighting. He was also in the affairs of the Panglang river, the attack and capture of stockades at Thantabain, the general engagement with Bandoola, the Burmese general, in front of Rangoon on 1 December, when he was slightly wounded, the actions of 5 and 8 December, and the attack on the enemy's fortified camp at Kokien on 15 December.

In 1825, he marched with the army to Prome, was promoted to be captain on 1 August, took part in the assault and capture on 1 December of Simbike, and in the affair near Prome on the following day, and at Patanagoh on the 24th. He was at the storm of Malown on 19 January 1826, and at the battle of Pagham-Mew on 9 February. For his services, he received the medal and clasp. On the conclusion of the war he resigned the adjutancy, and went home on leave of absence.

When Vivian returned to India in July 1827, he was appointed to the staff as assistant adjutant-general of the Nagpur subsidiary force, and in May 1830 was transferred in a similar capacity to the light field division of the Haidarabad subsidiary force at Jalnah. After nearly four years' furlough at home, he resumed this appointment in India until his promotion to a major on 9 December 1836. On 18 January 1837, he took over the command at Madras of a battalion of the 10th Madras native infantry and shortly after accompanied it to Belgaon. In February 1841, he was entrusted with the reduction of Fort Napani, which he captured on the 22nd, and received the thanks of Sir R. Dick, commander-in-chief (general orders dated 19 March 1841), for the judicious arrangements which he had made and the zeal and gallantry with which they were carried into effect. He also received the thanks of the governor in council at Bombay, dated 8 March 1841.

On 15 October 1841, Vivian was promoted to lieutenant-colonel, and on 5 January 1843 was removed to the 1st Madras European regiment, afterwards the Royal Dublin Fusiliers. From 1844 to 1847, he was again at home on furlough, and on his return to India, having the reputation of a smart commanding officer was posted to the command of several native infantry regiments in succession. On 14 August 1849, he was appointed adjutant-general of the Madras Army. He was promoted to brevet colonel on 15 September 1851, and on his resignation of the post of adjutant-general in August 1853, he was complimented in general orders for his services by the commander-in-chief, Madras (29 August 1853).

Vivian returned to England in January 1854, and on 28 November was promoted to major general. In 1855 he became a director of the East India Company. On 25 May of that year he was appointed to command the Turkish contingent in the Crimea, with the local rank of lieutenant-general. He organised this force of twenty thousand men, and with it during the winter of 1855–56 occupied the position of Kerch. For his Crimean services Vivian received the thanks of the government, the first class of the Turkish Order of the Medjidie, and the Turkish war medal.

On 22 January 1857, Vivian was appointed a Knight Commander of the Order of the Bath, and on 21 September 1858 was appointed by the crown a member of the newly constituted Council of India. On 30 September 1862, he was given the first and only colonelcy of the 102nd Regiment of Foot (Royal Madras Fusiliers), and, after its amalgamation in 1881 with the 103rd Foot to form the Dublin Fusiliers, was Colonel of the 1st Battalion of the new regiment. He was promoted lieutenant-general on 24 October 1862, and general on 22 November 1870. He was advanced to Knight Grand Cross of the Order of the Bath on 20 May 1871. He was a deputy-lieutenant for the city of London.

He retired from the service on a pension in 1877 and died on 3 May 1887 at his residence at Brighton, Sussex.

== Family ==
Vivian married, in 1846, Emma, widow of Captain Gordon of the Madras army. She died only four days before his death in 1887.
