= John Ryan (VC 1857) =

Irish recipient of the Victoria Cross

- Born: c. 1823; Kilkenny, Ireland
- Died: 4 March 1858 (aged 34–35); Cawnpore, British India
- Military career
- Allegiance: United Kingdom
- Branch: Madras Army
- Rank: Sergeant
- Units: 1st Madras European Fusiliers
- Conflicts: Indian Mutiny
- Awards: Victoria Cross

John Ryan VC (c. 1823 – 4 March 1858) was an Irish recipient of the Victoria Cross, the highest and most prestigious award for gallantry in the face of the enemy that can be awarded to British and Commonwealth forces.

== Details ==
He was about 34 years old, and a private in the 1st Madras Fusiliers (later The Royal Dublin Fusiliers), Madras Army during the Indian Mutiny when the following deed took place at the Relief of Lucknow for which he (and Peter McManus) were awarded the VC:

A party, on the 26th of September, 1857, was shut up and besieged in a house in the city of Lucknow, by the rebel sepoys...Private McManus in conjunction with Private John Ryan, rushed into the street, and took Captain Arnold, of the 1st Madras Fusiliers, out of a dooly, and brought him into the house in spite of a heavy fire, in which Captain Arnold was again wounded.

In addition to the above act, Private Ryan distinguished himself throughout the day by his intrepidity, and especially devoted himself to rescuing the wounded in the neighbourhood from being massacred. He was most anxious to visit every dooly.

(Extract from Divisional Orders of Major-General Sir James Outram. G.C.B., dated 11 October 1857.)

He later achieved the rank of Sergeant and was killed in action at Cawnpore, India, on 4 March 1858.

== The medal ==
His Victoria Cross is held by the National Army Museum, Chelsea, London.
