= John Blick Spurgin =

Sir John Blick Spurgin KCB CSI (1821–1903) was a British army officer, a prominent figure of the Indian Rebellion of 1857.

== Early life ==
He was the son of John Spurgin and his first wife, Eliza(beth) Walsham (or Walshman) Dax. He joined the Madras Army in 1842, and served with the Royal Madras Fusiliers. Entering at the rank of ensign, he became 2nd lieutenant in 1847. He was posted for a year's duty at Warley Barracks; and during this period he married.

With the Royal Madras Fusiliers, Spurgin took part in the Second Anglo-Burmese War and the capture of Pegu (Bago). He was promoted to captain in 1856.

== Rebellion of 1857 ==
At the outbreak in May 1857 of the Indian Rebellion, the upper command echelons of the Madras Fusiliers were sparse. The colonels were absent: Scudamore Winde Steel had returned permanently to the United Kingdom in 1856, and John Laurie (died 1861 at age 69) was officially on furlough. Morden Carthew, one of the lieutenant colonels, fought in Bengal as a Brigadier-General. The other lieutenant-colonel, Daniel H. Stevenson, was in poor health, and returned to the United Kingdom. The outcome was that at the end of April 1857, James George Smith Neill, who had just arrived from work with the Ottoman allies, took command of the Fusiliers, who had been anticipating a posting to the Anglo-Persian War that had just concluded.

During the early stages of the rebellion, in June 1857, Neill sent Spurgin with troops on rapid night marches along the Ganges River, from Benares (Varanasi) to Allahabad (Prayagraj), to support Henry Havelock's flank. Once at Allahabad, Neill decided on an advance by road to Kanpur (known then as Cawnpore) by road, by Major George Renaud on a punitive mission with a force that left on 30 June, while Spurgin moved along the Ganges, held back a few days to co-ordinate with Havelock.

On 3 July, on the steamer Brahmaputra, Spurgin set off along the river for Kanpur, having to forage for fuel on the way. The memoirs of Francis Cornwallis Maude, who calls the steamer Burrampoota and other variations, gives its captain as Dickson of the East India Company Marine. There were two Fusiliers lieutenants, Nelson Henry Arnold and Bailie (Bailey), both of whom died in the campaign according to Maude (not clear in the latter case), and an army surgeon. (Lieutenant W. S. Bailey had been shot on 13 June.) The vessel carried a number of Madras Fusiliers, two nine-pounder guns, and 20 invalided gunners. It proceeded in parallel with Havelock's advance on land, some 5 miles (8.0 km) away, towing five boats of provisions, and able to average just 1 knot (1.9 km/h; 1.2 mph) along an unfamiliar waterway. On 6 July it came under fire from the bank, requiring an engagement with a landing party. On 7 July a fort with guns was bombarded. On 11 July the steamer anchored, on Havelock's orders, and was attacked by artillery. Rebel boats massed for a crossing but were destroyed, and the rebel leader submitted to Spurgin.

On 9 July Neill sent a telegram to Charles Canning, in which he emphasised that Spurgin was following orders, and that the steamer was underpowered at 30 horsepower (22 kW). He said the river route to Kanpur was vital, and Havelock should be told so. Renaud was advancing on Fatehpur. Jwala Prasad for the rebel leader Tatya Tope sought battle there on 12 July, as Renaud and Havelock made rendezvous. A later newspaper report stated that Spurgin was present at this major action of the Awadh campaign.

Kanpur was taken by Havelock on 17 July. Spurgin's diary makes it clear that, in retaliation for rebel atrocities, sepoys were shot in Kanpur out of hand.

On 22 July, Spurgin was appointed a staff officer to Neill at Kanpur. On 31 July he replied to a letter from Captain Simpson, DAAG at Meerut to the west, including an account of the death of Sir Hugh Wheeler at the Satichaura Ghat.

Spurgin acted as brigade major in the Oudh Field Force (1st Brigade). Neill was killed by a sniper on 25 September, in central Lucknow. Spurgin recovered the body. His manuscript diary include an account of the relief of Lucknow; copies of diary entries from October and November 1857 are in the British Library. He went on to participate in Sir James Outram's operations against the Alambagh and Qaisar Bagh.

Spurgin was promoted to major in July 1858.

== Later life ==
In 1859 Spurgin left India. In 1866 he was promoted, from lieutenant-colonel to colonel. He retired on half-pay for a period, in 1872, from the 102nd Foot.

From 1873 to 1877 Spurgin commanded the 66th sub-district in Ireland. In 1877 he was made major-general, and posted to Naas in Ireland. The Naas Barracks was the future regimental depot of the Royal Dublin Fusiliers. It was in 1881 that Spurgin's old regiment, from 1861 correctly the 102nd (Royal Madras) Fusiliers, was merged with the former Royal Bombay Fusiliers (103rd), to form the Royal Dublin Fusiliers. In 1880 he was given the three-year appointment of the command at Aldershot of the 1st Brigade. He had the retirement rank of Lieutenant-General.

Spurgin was made honorary colonel of the Royal Dublin Fusiliers in January 1895, when Robert Walter M'Leod Fraser moved to the colonelcy of the Royal Irish Regiment.

He died at his home, 167 Victoria Street, London, on 27 November 1903.

== Awards and honours ==
Spurgin was knighted in the 1893 Birthday Honours, being made KCB. He had previous been made CB in 1869, and CSI in 1871.

== Family ==
In December 1848, at St Pancras New Church, Spurgin married Emma, third daughter of Henry Wakefield; she died in 1886 at age 60. Of their children:

- John Henry Spurgin, only son, was an officer in the Scots Fusiliers. He married in 1887 Beatrice Emma Wingrove, daughter of Drummond Wingrove.
- Emma Louisa (died 1887 or 1891) married in 1877 Peter Aubertin.
