= Thomas Duffy (VC) =

Recipient of the Victoria Cross (1824–1868)

- Born: b, 1824; Athlone, County Westmeath
- Died: 23 December 1868; Athlone, County Westmeath Ireland
- Burial place: Athlone area
- Military career
- Allegiance: United Kingdom
- Branch: Madras Army
- Rank: Private
- Units: 1st Madras European Fusiliers
- Conflicts: Indian Mutiny
- Awards: Victoria Cross

Thomas Duffy VC (b, 1824 to 23 December 1868), born in Mount Temple (Caulry), Athlone, County Westmeath, was an Irish recipient of the Victoria Cross, the highest and most prestigious award for gallantry in the face of the enemy that can be awarded to British and Commonwealth forces.

== Details ==
He was approximately 33 years old, and a private in the 1st Madras European Fusiliers (later The Royal Dublin Fusiliers), Indian Army during the Indian Mutiny when the following deed took place on 26 September 1857 at Lucknow, India for which he was awarded the VC: A 24-pounder gun which had been used against the enemy on the previous day was left in an exposed position and all efforts to reach it were unsuccessful, so heavy was the fire maintained on it by the mutineers. Private Duffy, however, who went out with two others, managed to fasten a rope to the gun in such a manner that it could be pulled away and was saved from falling into the hands of the enemy. His citation reads:

For his cool intrepidity and daring skill, whereby a 24-pounder gun was saved from falling into the hands of the enemy. (Extract from Divisional Orders of Major-General Sir James Outram, G.C.B., dated 16 October 1857.)

He died in Athlone on 23 December 1868 and is buried in the Athlone area.

His Victoria Cross was offered at auction on 27 October 1902. Today it is displayed at the National Army Museum in Chelsea, England.
