= 102nd Regiment of Foot (Royal Madras Fusiliers) =

- Active: 1742–1881
- Country: East India Company (1742–1858); United Kingdom (1858–1881)
- Branch: Madras Army (1742–1862); British Army (1862–1881)
- Type: Line infantry
- Size: Regiment (initially, one battalion, next two battalions 1774–1799, and 1824–1830)
- Garrison/HQ: Naas Barracks, County Kildare
- Colors: Blue Facings,
- March: Quick: Slow:
- Engagements: Second Carnatic War; Seven Years' War; Third Carnatic War; Third Anglo-Mysore War; Third Anglo-Maratha War; First Anglo-Burmese War; Second Anglo-Burmese War; Indian Rebellion

The 102nd Regiment of Foot (Royal Madras Fusiliers) was a line infantry regiment of the British Army raised by the Honourable East India Company in 1742. It transferred to the command of the British Army in 1862. Under the Childers Reforms it amalgamated with the 103rd Regiment of Foot in 1881 to form the Royal Dublin Fusiliers.

== History ==
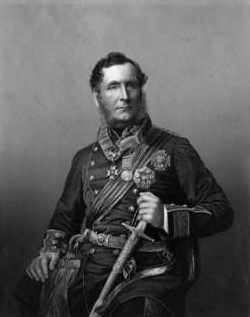
General Sir Robert Vivian, colonel of the regiment in the 1860s

=== Formation ===
The regiment was raised by the Honourable East India Company as the Madras Europeans from independent companies in 1742 – "European" indicating it was composed of British soldiers, not Indian sepoys. It saw action at the siege of Arcot in autumn 1751 during the Second Carnatic War and went on to fight at the Battle of Plassey in June 1757, the Battle of Condore in December 1758 and the Battle of Wandiwash in January 1760 during the Seven Years' War. It also fought at the siege of Pondicherry in September 1760 during the Third Carnatic War. It became the 1st Madras Europeans, on formation of the 2nd and 3rd Madras Europeans, in 1766. It went on to become the 1st Madras European Regiment in 1774. After that it took part in the siege of Nundydroog in October 1791 and the siege of Seringapatam in February 1792 during the Third Anglo-Mysore War.

=== Early nineteenth century ===
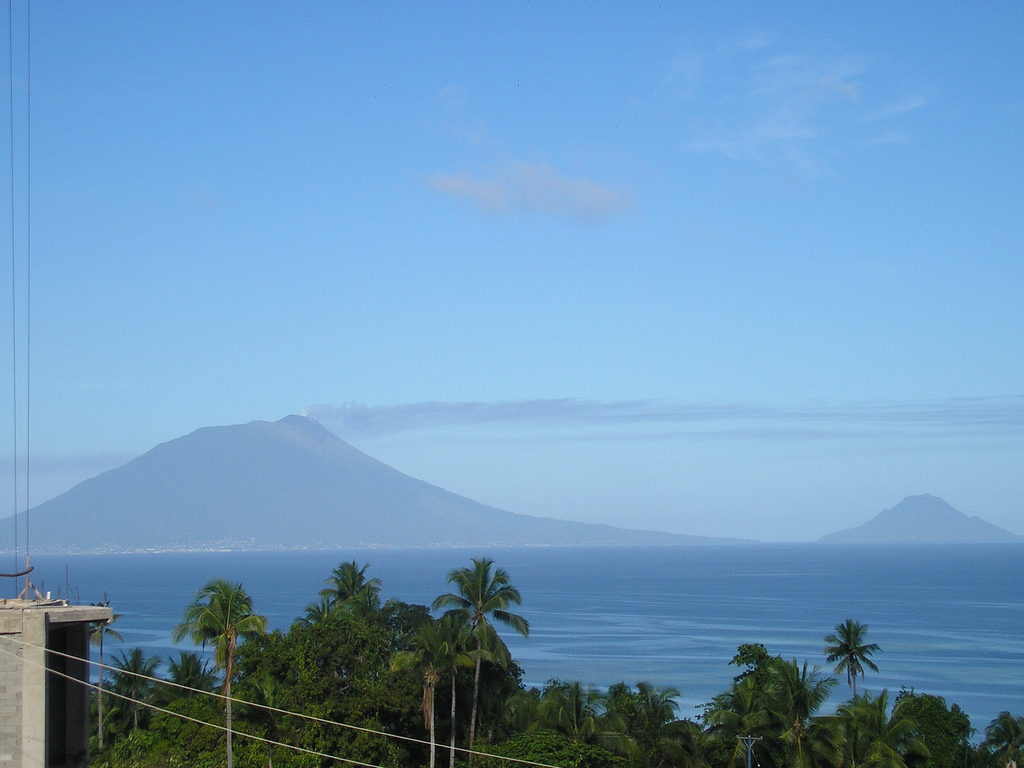
A view of Ternate occupied by the regiment in the early nineteenth century

The regiment next took part in expedition to the Dutch East Indies seeing action at the capture of Amboyna in February 1796 and its recapture in February 1810, the capture of Ternate in April 1801 and its recapture in August 1810 and the capture of Banda in March 1796 and its recapture in August 1810.

=== The Victorian era ===
The regiment returned to India in 1816 and took part in the Battle of Mahidpur in December 1817 during the Third Anglo-Maratha War. It was deployed to Burma in 1824 for service in the First Anglo-Burmese War: it formed part of an army which advanced up the River Irrawaddy to the Kingdom of Ava. It returned to India arriving in Madras in 1826. It transferred to Malacca in 1835 and became the 1st Madras (European) Fusiliers in 1843. After returning to India in early 1852 it was deployed to the Province of Pegu in April 1852 during the Second Anglo-Burmese War.

The regiment fought at the siege and relief of Lucknow in November 1857 during the Indian Rebellion. Three members of the regiment were awarded the Victoria Cross for their actions during the siege. After the Crown took control of the Presidency armies in the aftermath of the Rebellion, the regiment became the 1st Madras Fusiliers in July 1858 and then the 1st Royal Madras Fusiliers in May 1861. It was then renumbered as the 102nd Regiment of Foot (Royal Madras Fusiliers) on transfer to the British Army in September 1862. (Note: "Her Majesty's Government have expressed an anxious desire to preserve the proud recollections of distinguished service which belong especially to the older Regiments of each Presidency, and to incorporate with Her Majesty's Army, Corps which have so greatly contributed to the acquisition and maintenance of Her Majesty's Dominions in the East. Her Majesty having graciously determined to mark Her estimation of the services of Her Indian Armies, by conferring the designation of "Royal" upon three of the European Regiments, and by selecting for this honour one Regiment from each Presidency...has much gratification in announcing that the following Regiments will henceforward bear the honourable designation of "Royal" Regiments... The 1st Madras Fusiliers. The...older Regiments in the several Presidencies will thus be converted into Regiments of Her Majesty's General Army, and will be numbered and designated as follows... The 102nd Regiment of Foot (Royal Madras Fusiliers).) The regiment embarked for England in 1870 and was then deployed to Gibraltar in April 1876 and to Ceylon in 1879.

As part of the Cardwell Reforms of the 1870s, where single-battalion regiments were linked together to share a single depot and recruiting district in the United Kingdom, the 102nd was linked with the 103rd Regiment of Foot (Royal Bombay Fusiliers), and assigned to district no. 66 at Naas Barracks in County Kildare. On 1 July 1881 the Childers Reforms came into effect and the regiment amalgamated with the 103rd Regiment of Foot (Royal Bombay Fusiliers) to form the Royal Dublin Fusiliers.

=== Plassey the tiger ===
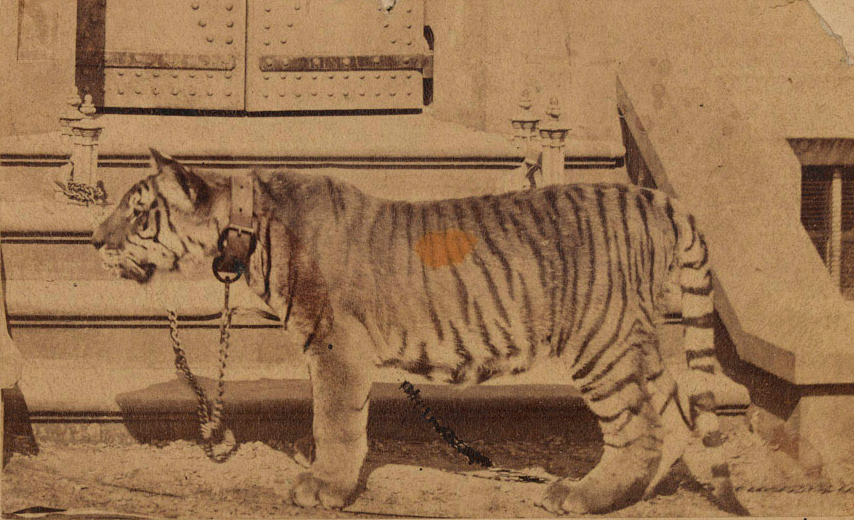
Plassey the tiger around 1870

The 102nd kept a tiger, named Plassey, during their deployments in India and the regiment's garrison at Dover. Named after the Battle of Plassey, the Bengal tiger cub was among a pair captured by Captain Frank Thackwell of the 5th Royal Irish Lancers, and later gifted to the 102nd. Plassey was among the other mascots of the 102nd, that being a dog and an antelope. Plassey came to be such a symbol of the regiment that the cap badge showed him. After the regiment was shipped back to Europe, Plassey stayed with the Dover garrison, where he lived alongside a pair of leopards. However, after having "alarmed" residents, Plassey was sent to the London Zoo, where he died in 1877.

== Battle honours ==
Battle honours won by the regiment were:

- Arcot
- Plassey
- Condore
- Wandiwash
- Pondicherry
- Nundy Droog
- Amboyna
- Ternate
- Banda
- Maheidpoor
- Ava
- Pegu
- Lucknow

== Victoria Crosses ==
- Private Thomas Duffy, Indian Mutiny (6 September 1857)
- Private John Ryan, Indian Mutiny (26 September 1857)
- Private John Smith, Indian Mutiny (16 November 1857)

== Colonels of the Regiment ==
Colonels of the Regiment included:

102nd Regiment of Foot (Royal Madras Fusiliers)

- 1862–1881: Gen. Sir Robert Vivian, GCB
