= Treaty of Seringapatam =

1792 treaty ending the Third Anglo-Mysore War

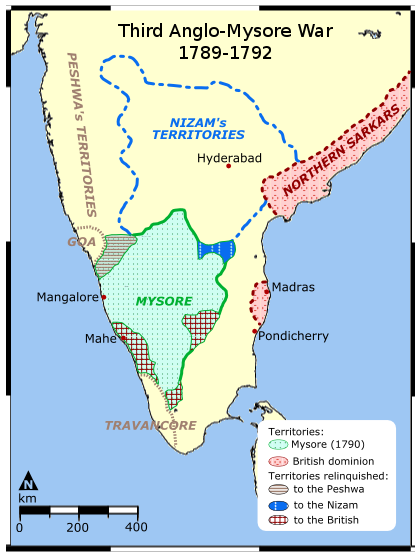
- Territories gained by the allies as per the treaty
- Context: Third Anglo-Mysore War
- Signed: 18 March, 1792
- Location: Seringapatam
- Signatories: (British Raj) Charles Cornwallis Tipu Sultan
- Parties: Maratha Confederacy (British Raj) British East Indies (Hyderabad State) Nizam of Hyderabad Kingdom of Mysore
- Languages: Marathi, Persian, English

The Treaty of Seringapatam (also called Srirangapatinam or Srirangapatna), signed 18 March 1792, ended the Third Anglo-Mysore War. Its signatories included Lord Cornwallis on behalf of the British East India Company, representatives of the Nizam of Hyderabad and the Maratha Empire, and Tipu Sultan, the ruler of Mysore.

== Background ==
The war broke out in late 1789 when Tipu Sultan, the ruler of the Kingdom of Mysore, attacked Travancore, an ally of the British East India Company. After a little over two years of fighting, forces of the company led by Lord Charles, 2nd Earl Cornwallis, along with allied forces from the Maratha Empire and Hyderabad, laid siege in February 1792 to Mysore's capital, Seringapatam (also called Srirangapatinam). Rather than attempting to storm the works at great cost to all sides, Cornwallis entered into negotiations with Tipu to end the conflict. The resulting treaty was signed on 18 March.

Cornwallis had hoped to use the treaty as a wide-ranging peace settlement that would, in addition to reducing or removing the threat of Mysore, prevent conflict between Hyderabad and the Marathas. The Marathas had, however, resisted inclusion of such language.

== Terms ==
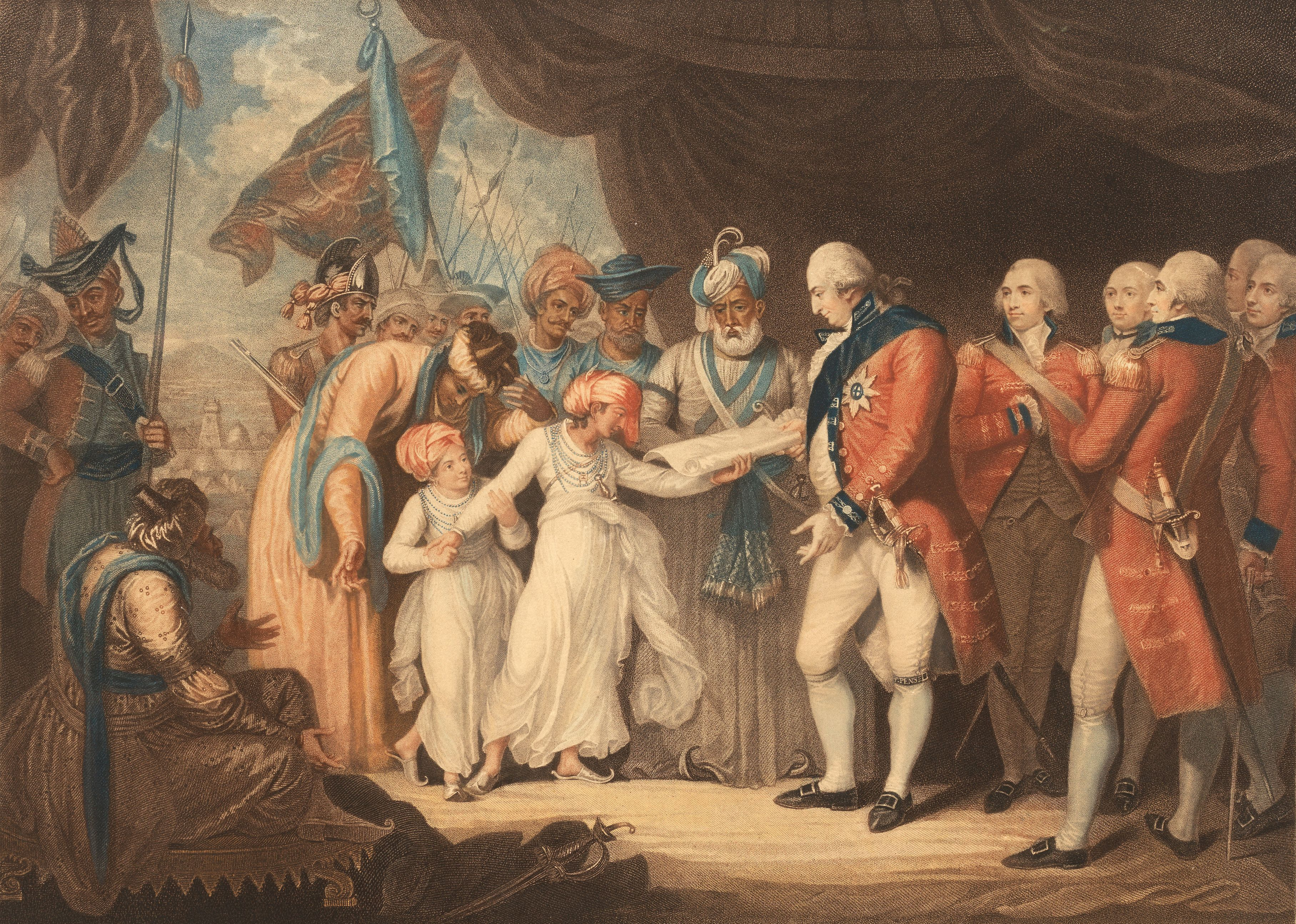
Lord Cornwallis receiving Tipu Sultan's sons as hostages on 26 February 1792

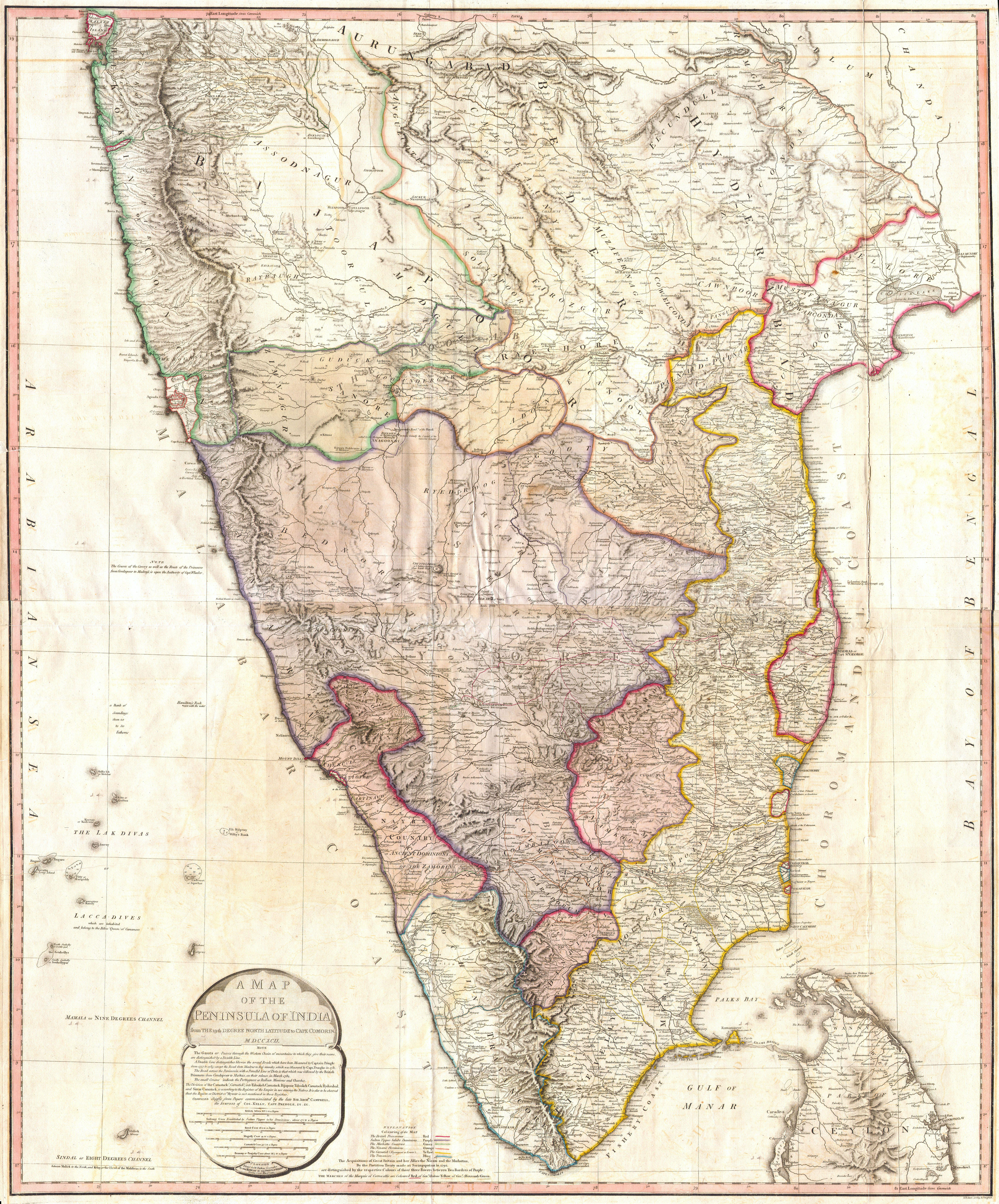
1800 map by James Rennell showing color-coded political areas, military campaigns by the British East India Company, and the lands acquired by the company through the Treaty of Seringapatam

Under the terms of the treaty, Mysore ceded about one-half of its territories to the other signatories. The Peshwa acquired territory up to the Tungabhadra River, the Nizam was awarded land from the Krishna to the Penner River, and the forts of Cuddapah and Gandikota on the south bank of the Penner. The East India Company received a large portion of Mysore's Malabar Coast territories between the Kingdom of Travancore and the Kali River, and the Baramahal and Dindigul districts. Mysore granted the rajah of Coorg his independence, although Coorg effectively became a company dependency.

Tipu Sultan, unable to pay an indemnity of 330 lakhs of rupees, was required to surrender two of his three sons as hostages of war.
