= Robert Downie =

- Robert Downie as depicted on a cigarette card
- Born: 12 January 1894; Glasgow, Lanarkshire, Scotland
- Died: 18 April 1968 (aged 74); Glasgow, Lanarkshire, Scotland
- Burial place: St. Kentigern's Cemetery, Glasgow
- Military career
- Allegiance: United Kingdom
- Branch: British Army
- Rank: Sergeant
- Units: The Royal Dublin Fusiliers; Home Guard
- Conflicts: World War I World War II
- Awards: Victoria Cross; Military Medal
- Other work: Cashier

Robert Downie VC, MM (12 January 1894 – 18 April 1968) was a Scottish recipient of the Victoria Cross, the highest and most prestigious award for gallantry in the face of the enemy that can be awarded to British and Commonwealth forces.

== World War I ==
Born on 12 January 1894 in Glasgow, Scotland, he had enlisted in 1912. He was 22 years old, and a sergeant in the 2nd Battalion, The Royal Dublin Fusiliers, British Army during the First World War when the following deed took place for which he was awarded the VC.

On 23 October 1916 east of Lesboeufs, France, when most of the officers had become casualties, Sergeant Downie, utterly regardless of personal danger and under very heavy fire, organised the attack which had been temporarily checked. At the critical moment he rushed forward shouting "Come on the Dubs!" which had an immediate response and the line rushed forward at this call. Sergeant Downie accounted for several of the enemy and in addition captured a machine-gun, killing the team. Although wounded early in the fight, he remained with his company, giving valuable assistance while the position was being consolidated.

On his homecoming, he arrived at Glasgow Central Station to be met by hundreds of people who carried him shoulder-high to a taxi. Springburn Road was decorated with flags and bunting and lined with hundreds more people, and his achievement was widely reported in the Glasgow press.

== Post World War I ==
On 8 June 1946, Robert attended the World War II Victory Day Celebration Reception held at the Dorchester Hotel, London.

He lived in Charleston Street, Springburn, until his death in 1968. Football fans at Celtic Park regularly saw him on a Saturday as he worked as a cashier at the turnstiles. A modest man, he often played down his bravery, saying he won the medals for having 'shot the cook'. He died on 18 April 1968.

Downie has a grave/memorial at St Kentigern's Cemetery, Glasgow, Scotland. Section 21. Lair 506. Headstone.

== Bibliography ==
- Irish Winners of the Victoria Cross (Richard Doherty & David Truesdale, 2000)
- Monuments to Courage (David Harvey, 1999)
- The Register of the Victoria Cross (This England, 1997)
- Ross, Graham (1995). Scotland's Forgotten Valour. MacLean Press. ISBN 978-1899272006.
- Gliddon, Gerald (2011) [1991]. Somme 1916. VCs of the First World War. The History Press. ISBN 978-0-7524-6303-2.
