= Irish Army Apprentice School =

Irish Defence Forces school

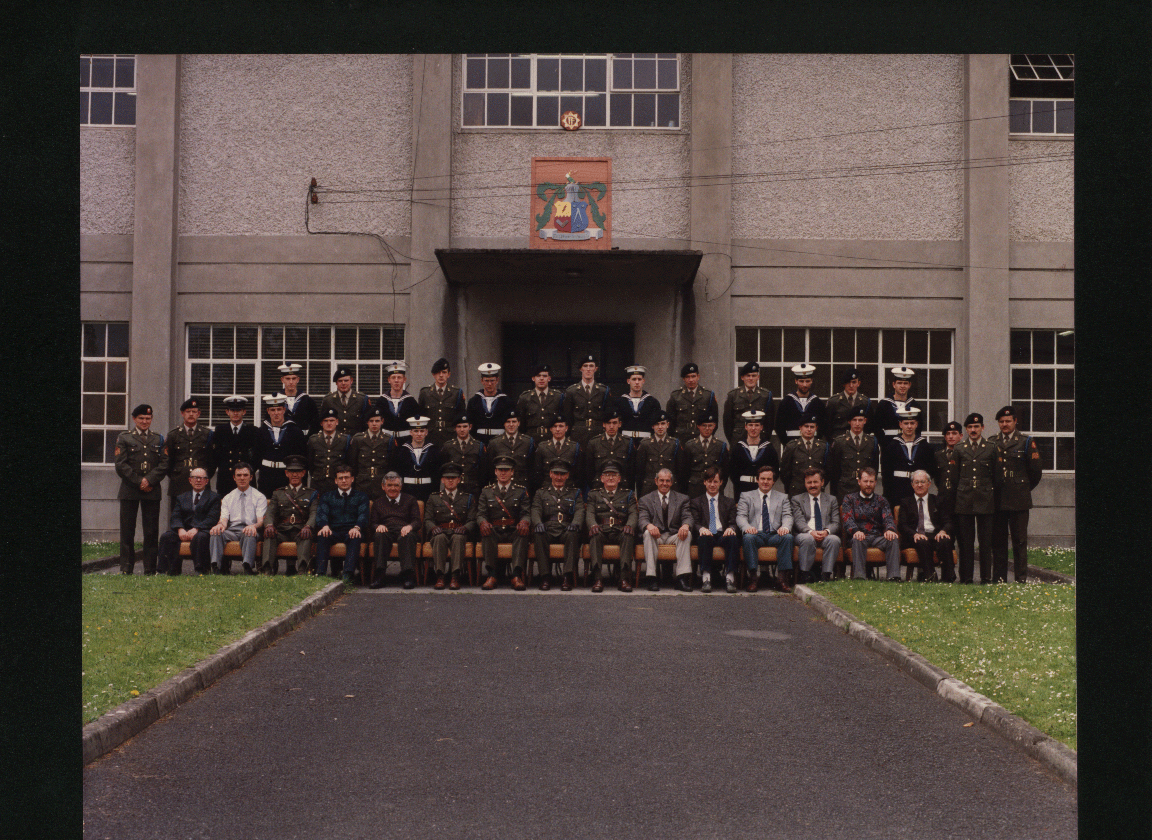
32nd Platoon, Irish Army Apprentice School 1987 to 1989

The Army Apprentice School (Irish: Scoil Phrintisigh an Airm), was situated in Devoy Barracks, Naas, County Kildare.

The school was established on 16 August 1956 when the Irish Defence Forces recognised the need for suitably trained craftsmen within the Irish Army and Naval Service. Apprentices were trained as a soldier first and a tradesman second. The Army Apprentice School (or AAS) closed in 1998 due to Irish government cutbacks at the time. The Irish Defence Forces would later send enlisted personnel to train as apprentices and send them to civilian colleges to be taught. Devoy Barracks was sold to a private company, who would later demolish it and build Kildare County Council offices and "The Osprey Hotel & Spa" on the site. The arch, the mechanics workshops and clock tower are the only structures remaining from the original barracks.

== Crest and motto ==
Crest of the Irish Army Apprentice School (1956 to 1998)

The school's motto, as it appears below the crest is "Ní Obair In Aisce Í", meaning "There is no work without gain".

== Enlistment ==
The apprenticeships had age limits on application. These were initially a minimum age of 15 years and a maximum age of 17 years. However, these age limits were later increased to a minimum age of 16 years and a maximum age of 18 years.

Apprentices under the age of 18 were also required to have their parents' written permission to be able to enlist. Their contract was for a four-year apprenticeship and they signed up for a period of 9 years service, which could later be extended to the standard 21 years service if the apprentice so wished.

If an apprentice wanted to terminate their contract they would have to "buy themselves out" (discharge by purchase). The cost for this in the 1990s was IR£25 during initial training and then rose to £5,000 for the fourth year and until completion of the 9-year contract.

== Apprenticeships and duration ==
Apprenticeships were offered in trades including:

- Electrician, Electrical Artificer (NS)
- Fitter/Armourer
- Motor Technician, Engine Room Artificer (NS)
- Carpenter, Shipwright (NS)
- Radio Technician, Radio/Radar Technician (NS)

The apprenticeship was broken into three parts:

=== 3 Years based in Devoy Barracks ===
Students held the rank of Apprentice, which was the equivalent to the rank of Recruit. Apprentices were required to spend three years at Devoy Barracks in Naas, Co. Kildare. During the three years in Devoy Barracks apprentices attended school onsite from September to June each year. The school was staffed by both civilians and army personnel. All apprentices were housed onsite in Devoy Barracks in dormitory-type prefab buildings and fed in the army dining-hall within the barracks. Apprentices were subject to Military law and standards.

From June to September each year the apprentices were required to undergo Military training, where they were taught the basics of military drill and fieldcraft for which external military instructors were brought in. This included two weeks of intensive training on the ground in either "Kilbride Military Camp" or the Glen of Imaal in Co. Wicklow. Upon completion of the 3 years the apprentices achieved the rank of "2 Star Private" or "Ordinary Seaman" in the case of Naval Apprentices.

=== 9 Weeks of 3 Star Training ===
After completing the 3 years in Devoy Barracks army apprentices were then relocated to a different barracks somewhere in Ireland for 9 weeks to undergo the standard "3 Star Private" military training. Naval apprentices were deployed to the Irish Naval Base in Haulbowline, Co. Cork for Mechanician training. After these 9 weeks the army apprentices were then posted to their new units in the various barracks scattered around Ireland to undergo the 4th year "On the Job" training.

=== 4th year of "On the job" training ===
(Radio Technicians attended the School of Signals in the Curragh Camp. Upon completing this year the Radio Technicians were deployed to different barracks throughout Ireland). The Naval Apprentices would complete additional technical training in the Naval College in Haulbowline before being posted to a Naval ship, usually as an "Able Mechanician" until their 4th apprenticeship year was complete.

== Naval apprentices in the AAS ==
The 32nd platoon was the first mixed Army/Navy apprentice platoon in the Irish Defence Force (PDF). 5 Electrical Artificer and 5 Engine Room Artificer apprentices from the Irish Naval Service spent the first 6 weeks at the Naval depot in Haulbowline island, before joining 20 Army colleagues in the AAS at Devoy Barracks. The Naval detachment were accompanied by a Naval Non Commissioned Officer for the duration of the 3 years of training, initially a Senior chief petty officer. The Navy apprentices wore naval uniform for the duration of their time at the AAS and did not wear the AAS insignia flash. Mixed platoons continued until the eventual closure of the School on a cost basis.

== Dress code ==
Apprentices wore the normal army issue uniform of the time. However, they were unique in having a blue patch on their beret behind the brass "Óglaigh na hÉireann" cap badge, rather than the standard red patch worn by other military personnel. They also wore a blue lanyard hanging from their shoulder on their formal Number 1 dress uniform.
