= John Smith (private) =

English recipient

- Born: c. 1822; London, England
- Died: 6 May 1866 (aged 43-44); Tanjore, British India
- Burial place: Taujore Cemetery, Trichinopoly
- Military career
- Allegiance: United Kingdom
- Branch: Madras Army
- Service years: 1841–1861
- Rank: Private
- Unit: 1st Madras European Fusiliers
- Conflicts: Indian Mutiny
- Awards: Victoria Cross

Private John Smith VC was an English recipient of the Victoria Cross, the highest and most prestigious award for gallantry in the face of the enemy that can be awarded to British and Commonwealth forces.

He was born in London about 1822 and enlisted in the 1st Madras European Fusiliers in 1841. He was awarded the Victoria Cross for action on 16 November 1857 at the Siege of Lucknow. His citation read:

For being one of the first to try and enter the gateway on the north side of Secundra Bagh. On the gateway being burst open, he was one of the first to enter, and was surrounded by the enemy. He received a sword-cut on the head, a bayonet wound on the left side, and a contusion from the butt-end of a musket on the right shoulder, notwithstanding which he fought his way out, and continued to perform his duties for the rest of the day.

Smith was discharged on pension in 1861 and died on 6 May 1866 at Tanjore, India.
