= Electrical artificer =

Engineering personnel flash of the Irish Naval Service

An electrical artificer (EA) is an electrical technician competent in the electrical maintenance of ship's machinery such as engines and generators. This was originally a Royal Navy term for those trained and competent in the installation and maintenance of ships electrical systems.

The title has been replaced in the Royal Navy. However the Irish Naval Service continues to use the term "electrical artificer" for electrical technicians. A distinctive propeller insignia is worn to identify these personnel.

== Training ==
Training is provided in the National Maritime College of Ireland (incorporated into the Cork Institute of Technology). Prior to its closure (in 1998), a number of electrical artificers were trained in the Irish Army Apprentice School and transferred to the Naval Service on completion of training.

== Ranks ==
Rank on completion of training is 'able EA', followed by promotion based on experience and training to 'leading EA', 'petty officer EA' and 'chief petty officer EA'. The highest possible rank is 'warrant officer EA' of which there is only one in the Irish Naval Service.
