= Horace Augustus Curtis =

English recipient of the Victoria Cross

Horace Augustus Curtis VC
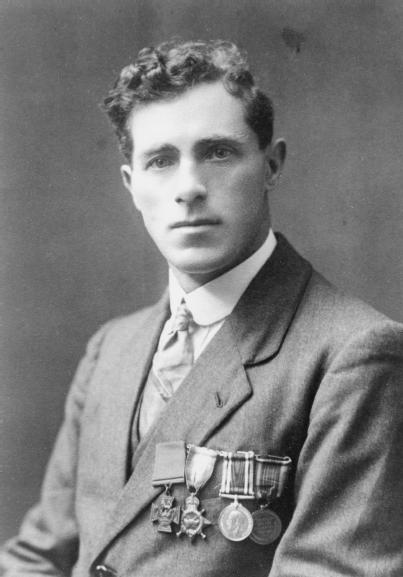
- Born: 7 March 1891; St Anthony-in-Roseland, Cornwall
- Died: 1 July 1968 (aged 77); Redruth, Cornwall
- Military career
- Allegiance: United Kingdom
- Branch: British Army
- Service years: 1914 - 1923
- Rank: Company Sergeant Major
- Units: The Duke of Cornwall's Light Infantry; The Royal Dublin Fusiliers
- Conflicts: World War I
- Awards: Victoria Cross

Horace Augustus Curtis VC (7 March 1891 – 1 July 1968) was an English recipient of the Victoria Cross, the highest and most prestigious award for gallantry in the face of the enemy that can be awarded to British and Commonwealth forces.

== Early life ==
The son of a gamekeeper and the fourth of five children, Horace Augustus Curtis was born in St Anthony-in-Roseland, Cornwall on 7 March 1891. His home was at Glenburn in St Newlyn East. After attending and leaving school he "was employed as a china clay worker until September 1914", just a few weeks after the outbreak of the First World War.

== First World War ==
It was during this time when he, like so many other young men of his generation, volunteered for service with the British Army. On 12 September he joined the Duke of Cornwall's Light Infantry (DCLI) at Bodmin, with his service number being 15833. However, within days of enlisting in the DCLI, he was transferred to the Royal Dublin Fusiliers, "as recruiting in Ireland was not as successful as in England", becoming one of several thousand recruits originally from an English regiment transferred to an Irish one. As a result, he was given a new service number, 14107, and soon left England for County Kildare in Ireland to train with the 7th (Service) Battalion of his regiment, with which he would remain throughout most of the war. His battalion was one of four which made up the 30th Brigade (which itself was one of three brigades which made up the 10th (Irish) Division) which, in February 1915, moved to Dublin where it continued to train until May when it moved again, this time to England, "to continue their training in Basingstoke". In July the 10th Division left Devonport, its destination being Egypt. It took part in the landing at Suvla Bay the following month and, over the next few weeks, after it suffered very "high casualties during the fighting against Turkish forces", forcing it to leave for Salonika before being sent back to Egypt in October.

In February 1916 Curtis was promoted to lance corporal and then received another promotion, this time to the rank of sergeant, some nine months later. He was also mentioned in dispatches, presumably for his services at Gallipoli, in July 1917. In September of that year Curtis, together with the rest of the 10th Division, departed Alexandria and the division found itself engaged in fighting in Palestine.

In the spring of 1918 Curtis's battalion, the 7th Dublin Fusiliers, was transferred from the 10th Division to the Western Front, arriving there in early June. "On the 6th Curtis was one of the men from the battalion to be absorbed into the 2nd Battalion and, a fortnight later, and due to him suffering from malaria, he left for England and became a patient in Bermondsey Military Hospital. He also had some much overdue leave in Cornwall between 24 July and 3 August". His leave over, he returned once more to the Western Front on 19 August, "and was back on frontline duty on 21 September".

== VC action ==
On 18 October 1918, No. 14107 Sergeant Curtis, 2nd Battalion Royal Dublin Fusiliers fought in action near Le Cateau that earned him the Victoria Cross. The following is the official citation, which appeared in the London Gazette on 6 January 1919.

No.14107 Sjt. Horace Augustus Curtis.2nd Battalion, R. Dub. Fus (Newlyn East, Cornwall) For most conspicuous bravery and devotion to duty East of Le Cateau on the morning of 18th October 1918, when in attack his platoon came unexpectedly under intense machine-gun fire. Realising that the attack would fail unless the enemy guns were silenced, Sjt Curtis, without hesitation, rushed forward through our own barrage and the enemy fire and killed and wounded the teams of two of the guns, whereupon the remaining four guns surrendered. Then turning his attention to a train-load of reinforcements, he succeeded in capturing over 100 enemy before his comrades joined him. His valour and disregard of danger inspired all.

His VC was presented to him by King George V at Buckingham Palace on 8 March 1919.

== Post war ==
Curtis was discharged on 31 March 1920. He joined the 5th (Territorial) Battalion DCLI on a 3-year engagement at St Columb on 5 May 1920. Private 5431368, he was rapidly promoted to Sergeant and by 27 August 1920 was WO2 (CSM). On 20 December 1921, he transferred to the 4/5th DCLI and on 19 May 1923 his service was terminated at the end of his engagement.

Curtis, who became increasingly more ill during the 1960s, eventually becoming almost completely paralysed, died on 1 July 1968, at the age of seventy-seven.

== The Medal ==
His VC is on display in the Lord Ashcroft Collection at the Imperial War Museum, London.

== Bibliography ==
- Buzzell, Nora, ed. (1997). The Register of the Victoria Cross. Cheltenham, Gloucestershire: This England Alma House. ISBN 0-906324-27-0.
- Gliddon, Gerald (2000). The Final Days 1918. VCs of the First World War. Sutton Publishing. ISBN 0-7509-2485-3.
- Ashcroft, Michael (2007) [2006]. Victoria Cross Heroes. London: Headline Review. ISBN 978-0-7553-1633-5.
- Harvey, David (2000). Monuments to Courage. Naval & Military Press Ltd. ISBN 1-84342-356-1.
