= Devoy Barracks =

- Dún Uí Dhubhuí
- Naas, County Kildare
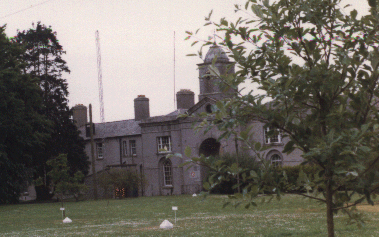
- The archway at Devoy Barracks

Site information
- Type: Barracks
- Operator: (Republic of Ireland) Irish Army

Location
- Location within Ireland
- Coordinates: 53.21638°N 6.67083°W

Site history
- Built: 1813
- Built for: War Office
- In use: 1813-1928; 1956-1998

Garrison information
- Garrison: Royal Dublin Fusiliers

Devoy Barracks (Irish: Dún Uí Dhubhuí) was a military installation in Naas, County Kildare in Ireland. Originally known as Naas Barracks and built in the 19th century, the barracks closed in the 1990s.

== History ==
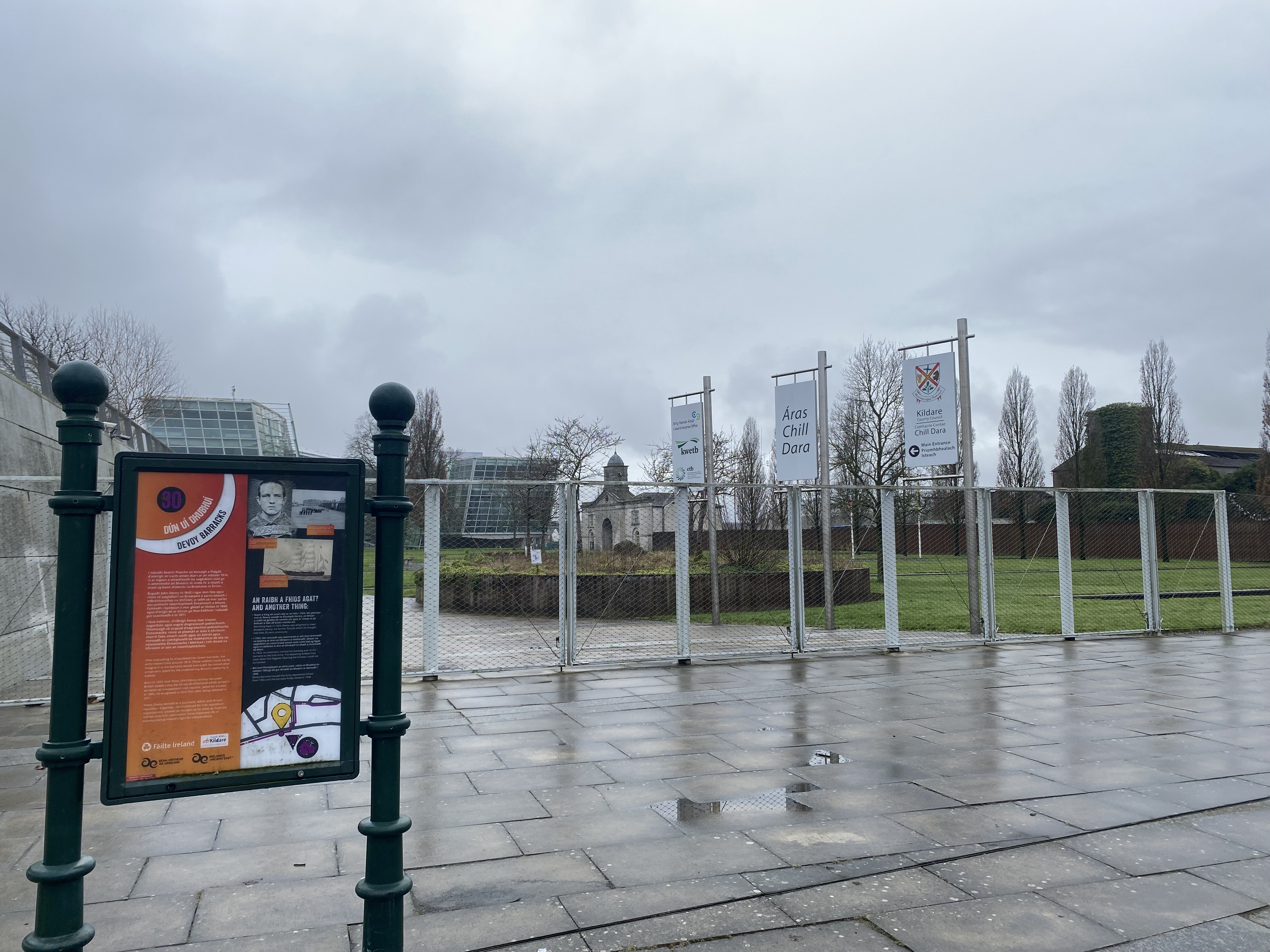
Former site of Devoy Barracks, now the Áras Chill Dara

The barracks, which were originally known as Naas Barracks, were built for local militia units in 1813. In 1873 a system of recruiting areas based on counties was instituted under the Cardwell Reforms and the barracks became the depot for the 102nd Regiment of Foot (Royal Madras Fusiliers) and the 103rd Regiment of Foot (Royal Bombay Fusiliers). Following the Childers Reforms, the 102nd and 103rd regiments amalgamated to form the Royal Dublin Fusiliers with its depot in the barracks in 1881.

The Royal Dublin Fusiliers were disbanded at the time of Irish Independence in 1922. The barracks were secured by the forces of the Irish Free State in February 1922. The barracks, which were renamed Devoy Barracks after John Devoy, the Irish republican, closed in 1928 and the site was subsequently used for a variety of industrial uses. The Irish Army Apprentice School was established on the site in 1956 but closed in 1998 when the barracks were finally decommissioned.

== See also ==
- Irish Army Apprentice School
- List of Irish military installations
