= Peter McManus =

Recipient of the Victoria Cross

- Born: March 1829; Tynan, County Armagh
- Died: 27 April 1859 (aged 30); Allahabad, British India
- Military career
- Allegiance: United Kingdom
- Branch: British Army
- Rank: Sergeant
- Units: 5th Regiment of Foot
- Conflicts: Indian Mutiny
- Awards: Victoria Cross

Peter McManus VC (March 1829 – 27 April 1859) was born in Tynan, County Armagh, was an Irish recipient of the Victoria Cross, the highest and most prestigious award for gallantry in the face of the enemy that can be awarded to British and Commonwealth forces.

== Details ==
McManus was approximately 28 years old, and a private in the 1st Battalion, 5th Regiment of Foot (later The Northumberland Fusiliers), British Army during the Indian Mutiny when the following deed took place on 26 September 1857 at Lucknow, India for which he and Private John Ryan was awarded the VC:

A party, on the 26th of September, 1857, was shut up and besieged in a house in the city of Lucknow, by the rebel sepoys...Private McManus kept outside the house, until he was himself wounded, and under cover of a pillar, kept firing on the sepoys and preventing their rushing on the house. He also, in conjunction with Private John Ryan, rushed into the street, and took Captain Arnold, of the 1st Madras Fusiliers, out of a dooly, and brought him into the house in spite of a heavy fire, in which Captain Arnold was again wounded. (Extract from Divisional Orders of Major-General Sir James Outrun, G.C.B., dated 14 October 1857.)

He later achieved the rank of sergeant. He died from smallpox in Allahabad, British India, on 27 April 1859.
