= James Ockendon =

English Victoria Cross recipient (1890–1966)

- James Ockendon VC MM painted by Eric Kennington in 1943
- Born: 10 December 1890; Portsmouth, Hampshire
- Died: 29 August 1966 (aged 75); Southsea, Hampshire
- Burial place: Porchester Crematorium
- Military career
- Allegiance: United Kingdom
- Branch: British Army
- Service years: 1909–1918
- Rank: Company Sergeant Major
- Units: The Royal Dublin Fusiliers
- Conflicts: World War I; Gallipoli Campaign; Western Front; Battle of Broodseinde
- Awards: Victoria Cross; Military Medal; Croix de Guerre (Belgium)

James Ockendon VC, MM (10 December 1890 – 29 August 1966) was an English recipient of the Victoria Cross (VC), the highest and most prestigious award for gallantry in the face of the enemy that can be awarded to British and Commonwealth forces.

== Early years ==
He was one of nine children born to Alfred and Mary Ockendon at 56, Alfred Street, Landport. He attended St Agatha's School, following which he worked for Chalcraft's, a draper in Russell Street, Portsmouth. After working here for five years he joined the Royal Dublin Fusiliers in 1909 as a private. After completing his basic training at the Victoria Barracks in Southsea he served in India. During World War I Ockendon saw action in Turkey during the Gallipoli Campaign where, on 24 April 1915, he landed with his battalion on ‘V’ beach and received a bullet wound to his forehead.

Following his recuperation he served in Egypt. While on leave he married Caroline ("Carrie") Anne at St Luke's Church in Portsmouth on 20 August 1917. They had four children. Soon after his marriage he joined the First Battalion at the Western Front in France where he was awarded the Military Medal for bravery on 28 September 1917 during the opening stages of the Third Battle of Ypres.

== Citation ==
Ockendon was 26 years old and a sergeant in the 1st Battalion, The Royal Dublin Fusiliers, British Army, when the following deed led to the award of the Victoria Cross. On 4 October 1917 east of Langemarck, Belgium, Sergeant Ockendon was acting as company sergeant-major. Seeing the platoon on the right held up by an enemy machine-gun, he immediately rushed the gun and captured it, killing the crew. He then led a section to the attack on a farm, where under very heavy fire he rushed forward and called on the garrison to surrender. As the enemy continued to fire on him, he opened fire, killing four, whereupon the remaining 16 surrendered.

== Later life ==
The awarding of his Victoria Cross was published in The London Gazette on 5 November 1917 and he was presented with the award by George V at Buckingham Palace on 5 December 1917. In April 1918, he was awarded the Belgian Croix de Guerre, and in the same month he was honourably discharged from the army on medical grounds.

After the war, he was employed in the dockyard as a crane driver and after he retired from such employment, he worked as a school caretaker and then at No3 Training Battalion, Royal Army Ordnance Corps, in Hilsea. During the Second World War, Ockendon served in the Portsmouth Division of the Home Guard. His portrait by the artist Eric Kennington was reproduced in Britain's Home Guard, written by John Brophy and published in 1945.

He died in his home at Southsea on 29 August 1966, and his funeral took place at Portchester on 1 September. His ashes were scattered in the Garden of Remembrance. In 1962 Ockendon Close was named in his honour. (Note: Ockendon Close location:50.792237°N 1.089714°W)

== Medals ==
Ockendon's medals are: Victoria Cross, Military Medal, 1914 Star, British War Medal, Victory Medal with MiD Oakleaf, Defence Medal (1939–45), King George VI Coronation Medal (1937), Queen Elizabeth II Coronation Medal (1953), Croix de Guerre (Belgium). The medals, still in the possession of his granddaughter, were shown and discussed on the BBC Television programme Antiques Roadshow in May 2022.

== Bibliography ==
- Snelling, Stephen (2012) [1998]. Passchendaele 1917. VCs of the First World War. The History Press. ISBN 978-0752476667.
