= Siege of Seringapatam (1792) =

1792 siege in Mysore, India

- Part of the Third Anglo-Mysore War
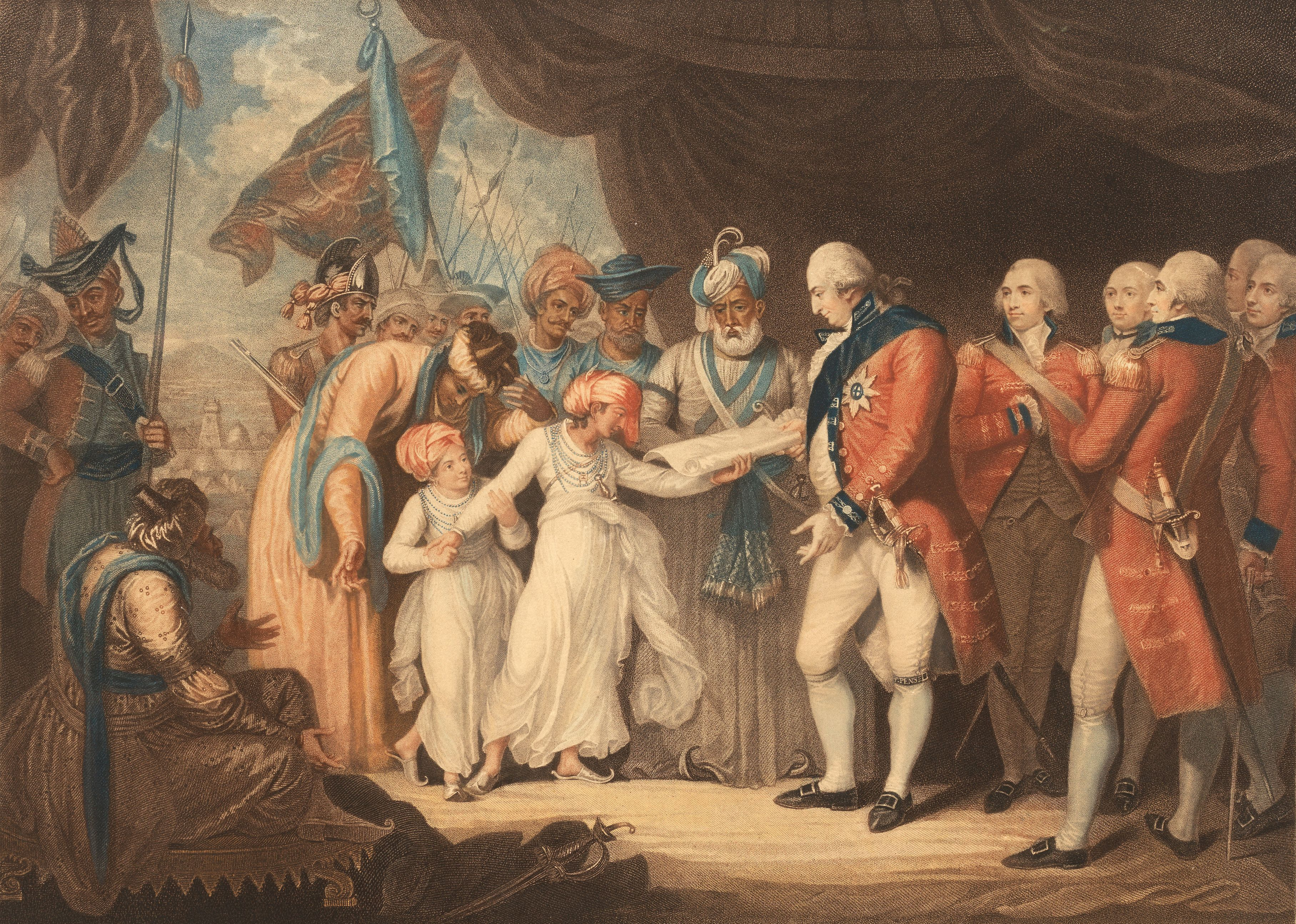
- Lord Cornwallis receiving Tipu Sultan's sons as hostages on 26 February 1792
Date	5 February – 18 March 1792 (5 weeks, 6 days)
Location	Srirangapattana, Mysore 12.414°N 76.704°E
Result	Allied victory
Territorial changes	Treaty of Seringapatam; Mysore cedes roughly half of its territories to Allies

Belligerents
East India Company; Hyderabad; Maratha Empire	Sultanate of Mysore

Commanders and leaders
Charles Cornwallis (WIA); Robert Abercromby (Maratha Empire) Parshuram Bhou; Mahabat Jung	Tipu Sultan

Casualties and losses
535 killed or wounded	Unknown

The 1792 siege of Seringapatam was a battle and siege of the Mysorean capital city of Seringapatam (Srirangapatna) at the end of the Third Anglo-Mysore War. An army led by Charles, Earl Cornwallis, consisting of British East India Company and British Army forces, along with allied forces from the Maratha Empire and the Nizam of Hyderabad, arrived at Seringapatam on 5 February 1792, and after over five weeks of battle and siege, forced Tipu Sultan to capitulate. With his agreement to the Treaty of Seringapatam on 18 March 1792, the war came to an end.

== Background ==
The prospects for Tipu Sultan, the Muslim ruler of the Kingdom of Mysore, had declined significantly during the 1791 campaign season of the Third Anglo-Mysore War. Although he had been able to reverse some advances made by forces of the British East India Company forces under General William Medows in 1790, he had lost ground on all fronts in 1791, and only a slash-and-burn policy to deprive his opponents of provisions and forage had prevented company forces under Charles Cornwallis from besieging his capital, Seringapatam. Cornwallis, whose army had been desperately short of provisions, withdrew to Bangalore in May 1791 to resupply his army and wait out the monsoon rains. Tipu took advantage of the British retreat to recover Coimbatore, but he lost several strong points when British forces captured Nundydroog and Savendroog late in 1791, and Britain's allies in the conflict, the Nizam of Hyderabad and the Marathas, also made territorial gains at his expense.

=== British forces ===
The force that Cornwallis assembled at Savendroog in January 1792 consisted of about 20,000 company and British Army troops, a horde of the nizam's cavalry, and an enormous civilian camp that trailed after the marching companies when it left Savendroog on 25 January. After stopping at Outradroog to join with additional Hyderabadi troops, the great army marched on, only mildly harassed by Tipu's cavalry, until its advance guard got about 7 miles (11 km) north of Seringapatam on 5 February, where the plains below Seringapatam opened and Cornwallis established a position from which Tipu's defences could be examined. Tipu punctuated the arrival of the British by showering them with rockets in an ineffective yet impressive display of technology. (Tipu's rockets were probably influential on William Congreve, who went on to develop what are now called Congreve rockets.)

In addition to the grand army, Cornwallis had ordered General Robert Abercromby to lead a supporting army of about 6,000 men from the Malabar (western) coast.

=== Tipu's defences ===
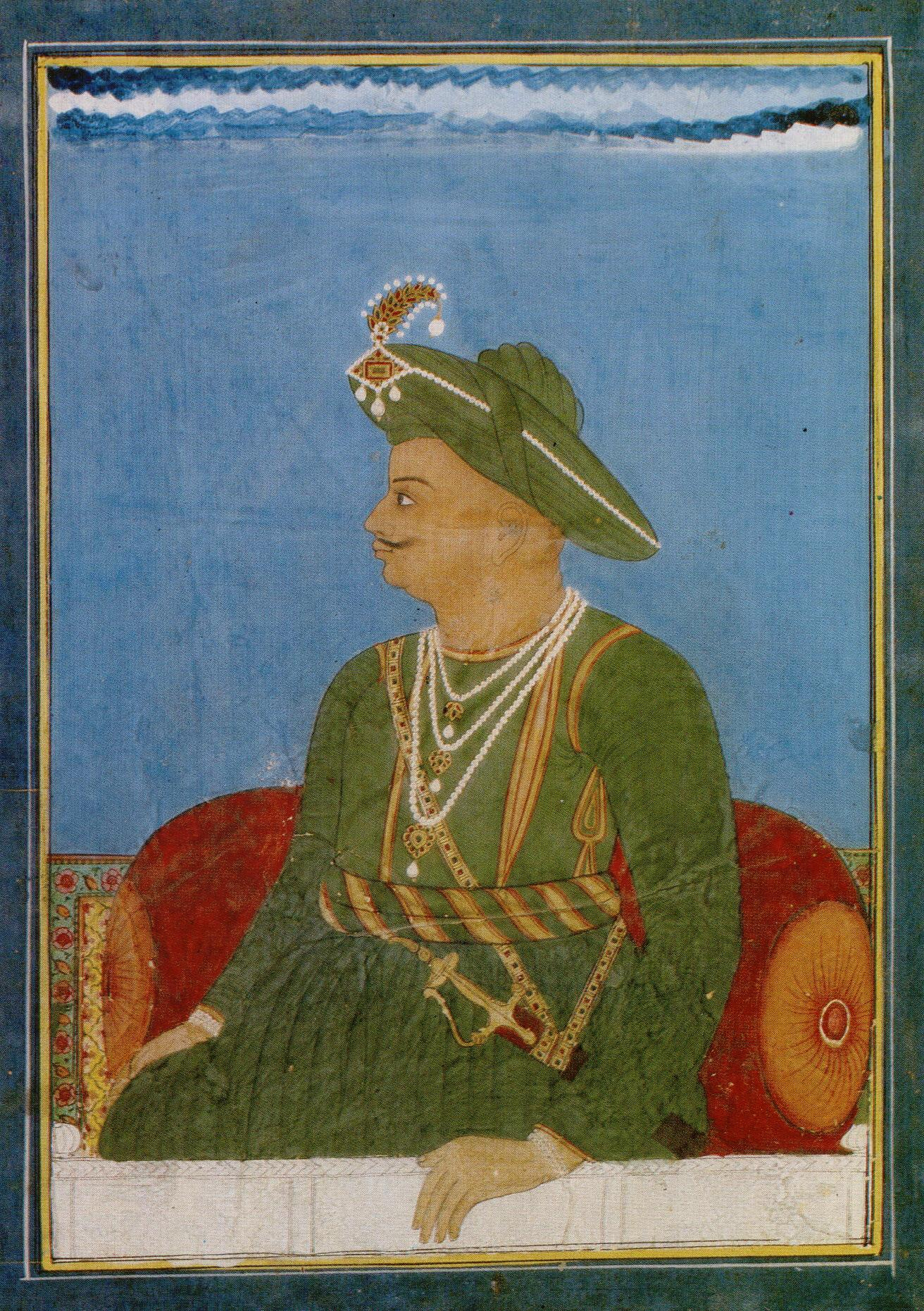
Tipu Sultan

The city of Seringapatam occupied an island in the Kaveri River, which at that point flowed roughly west-to-east from the Western Ghats on its way to the Bay of Bengal. The city proper occupied the center of the island, with the western end of the island occupied by a strong stone fortress, and the eastern end by a large walled garden that included Tipu's palace and the tomb of his father, Hyder Ali. Tipu had arrayed army, which Cornwallis estimated to number between forty and fifty thousand, along a roughly semicircular line on the northern shore of the Kaveri that covered the approaches to the island. This line, three to four miles (four to five km) long, was studded with six redoubts, and much of the line was protected by a thick hedge. To the east (Tipu's right) the line was anchored by Karigaut Hill, and the entire line was arranged to be within firing range of either the fort or entrenched positions on the island.

Cornwallis, after inspecting the city's defences on 6 February, decided to attack even though Abercromby's column had not yet reached the area. As long as Tipu's army was outside the city's defences, he could conduct a proper siege, and his opponent's freedom to act might also interfere with the arrival of Abercromby, who would have to cross the Kaveri (a difficult proposition for an army even without hostile forces nearby) to make a junction with the grand army. Cornwallis planned a nighttime attack with three components. General Medows would lead 7 battalions on the right, where he was to drive Tipu's left back toward the fort, while Lieutenant Colonel Maxwell would lead 4 battalions to gain Karigaut Hill on the left. Cornwallis himself would direct 8 battalions in the center with the objective of gaining the river near the eastern end of the fort. If successful, the Mysoreans would be driven onto the island, and either Cornwallis or Maxwell would be able to follow and establish a strong position from which the fort could be besieged. Since the battle was to take place at night, they would be unable to use artillery to provide covering fire, so he ordered the attacks to be made only with musket and bayonet. Cornwallis deliberately excluded the nizam's forces from the action, since he did not trust them to act effectively.

== Battle ==
Cornwallis did not divulge details of the plan until one hour before the attack. At around 9 pm the three divisions left camp. In the center, Cornwallis advanced to the hedge, which his force reached around 11. By then gunfire from his left indicated that Maxwell's men had already begun their attack on Karigaut Hill, and the sounds had thrown the Mysorean troops in the center into some disorder. Cornwallis ordered his men through the hedge; the British troops closed with the bayonet on the Mysoreans, who fled in near-panic, leaving artillery, tents, and provisions behind. One redoubt gave resistance and was stormed. Maxwell's and Cornwallis' men chased the fleeing Mysoreans as they crossed the bridges onto the island and sought the shelter of the fort. Tipu, from his position in the fort, observed the disaster and then raised the drawbridge to prevent British troops, which were by then intermingled with the Mysoreans, from gaining entry to the fort. While this secured his own position, it left many of his troops at the mercy of the British.

The division of General Medows did not fare quite as well as the other two. Medows strayed too far to the west in the dark, and although he successfully took the westernmost redoubt of the Mysorean line, he was prevented from approaching the island by a series of ravines and swampy ground. This created a gap in the British lines between the center and right, exposing Cornwallis, who had held back from the lines with a single battalion, to personal danger. Tipu sought to exploit this gap in order to recover the camp, and organized an infantry attack against the gap. Cornwallis was able to rally his men and repulse the counterattack, but his hand was grazed by a bullet during the action.

When daylight arrived the field of battle was more clearly visible to all, and Tipu ordered his artillery to begin firing on the British positions. Significantly exposed, Cornwallis withdrew his command to Karigaut Hill, abandoning part of his camp in the process, and leaving a detachment of men in the captured redoubt. This enabled the Mysorean cavalry to roam freely through the area while Tipu's artillery continued to play on exposed British positions. Unable to support the men in the redoubt, Cornwallis had to watch as the Mysoreans made five attempts to storm the redoubt, all of which were repulsed. When night fell, Cornwallis was able to advance and relieve the beleaguered men in the redoubt. Tipu also used the night to withdraw his men entirely from the north shore of the Kaveri, enabling Cornwallis to completely surround the fort.

== Siege ==
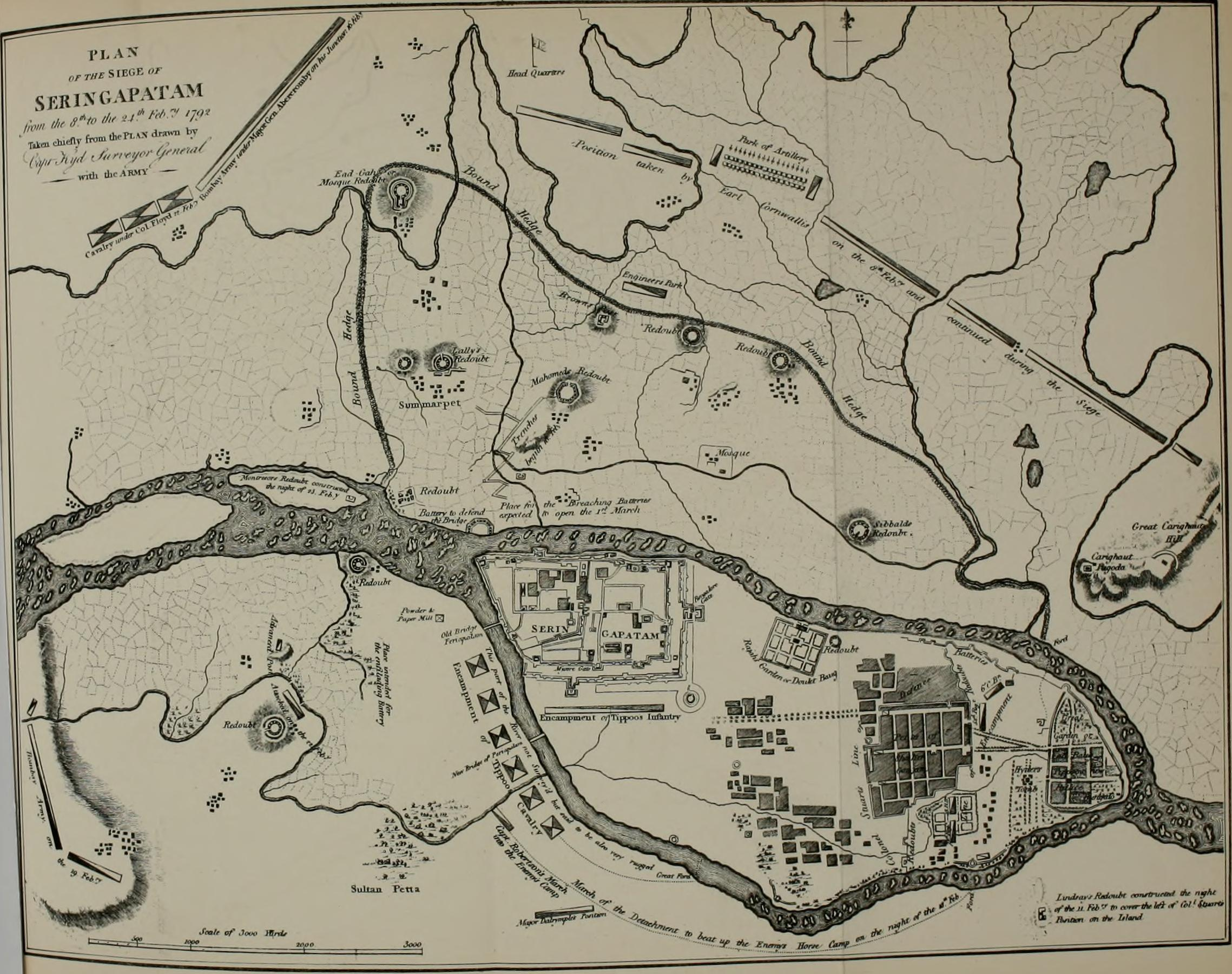
Plan of the siege

In order to hasten the arrival of Abercromby's force, Cornwallis dispatched companies of Hyderabadi and Marathan cavalry to meet and escort them to the area. On 10 February Abercromby's force arrived in camp, in spite of a sortie led by Tipu personally in an attempt to prevent the meeting from happening. From this point, the siege became a matter of routine, as the British lines slowly advanced on the island toward the fortress. On 23 February Cornwallis inspected the unfinished first parallel. That same day, Tipu sent out negotiators to end hostilities.

== Peace ==
Although fire ceased on 24 February, peace was not formally agreed until 18 March, when Tipu agreed to the severe terms of the Treaty of Seringapatam. Cornwallis made a preliminary demand that Tipu surrender two of his sons as hostages of war to guarantee Tipu's performance. On 26 February, in a ceremony immortalized in art by Robert Home, who accompanied Cornwallis on the expedition, Tipu's sons, aged seven and eleven, were delivered with great pomp and circumstance to Cornwallis' care.

The treaty terms forced by the victors on Tipu were harsh. Mysore's size was reduced by half, with the company, the nizam, and the Marathas sharing in the spoils. The territories taken by the company were chosen in part to ease the difficulty of defending against future attacks from Mysore, although the final war with Mysore was initiated by the British in anticipation of further military action by Tipu. In that war, Seringapatam was stormed and Tipu died in its defence.

General Medows was apparently distraught over his poor performance in the battle. On 27 February, after meeting with Cornwallis, he returned to his tent, and attempted to commit suicide, firing three bullets into his body with a pistol. He failed in even this, and spent several days in agony. His hopes dashed at ever gaining the command of India, he eventually returned to England. Cornwallis never blamed him for his failures on the night of 6 February.
