= 103rd Regiment of Foot (Royal Bombay Fusiliers) =

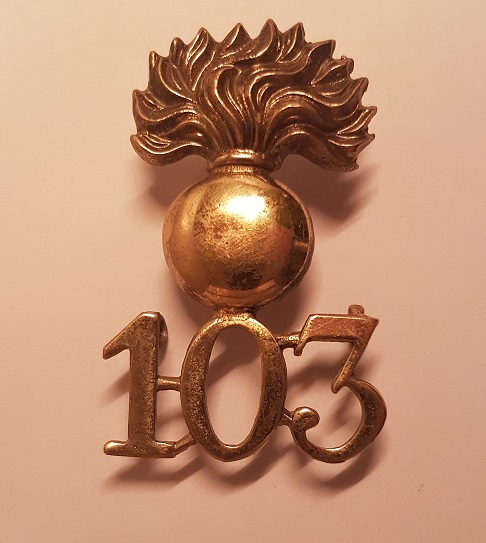
- Cap badge of the 103rd Regiment of Foot (Royal Bombay Fusiliers)
- Active: 1662–1881
- Country: East India Company (1662–1858); United Kingdom (1858–1881)
- Branch: Bombay Army (1662–1862); British Army (1862–1881)
- Role: Infantry
- Size: One battalion
- Garrison/HQ: Naas Barracks, County Kildare
- Colors: white facings, changed to dark blue in 1861.
- Engagements: Seven Years' War; Third Anglo-Mysore War; Third Anglo-Maratha War; Fourth Anglo-Mysore War; Second Anglo-Sikh War; Indian Rebellion

The 103rd Regiment of Foot (Royal Bombay Fusiliers) was a regiment raised in 1662. It transferred to the command of the Honourable East India Company in 1668 and to the command of the British Army in 1862. Under the Childers Reforms it amalgamated with the 102nd Regiment of Foot (Royal Madras Fusiliers) to form the Royal Dublin Fusiliers in 1881.

== History ==
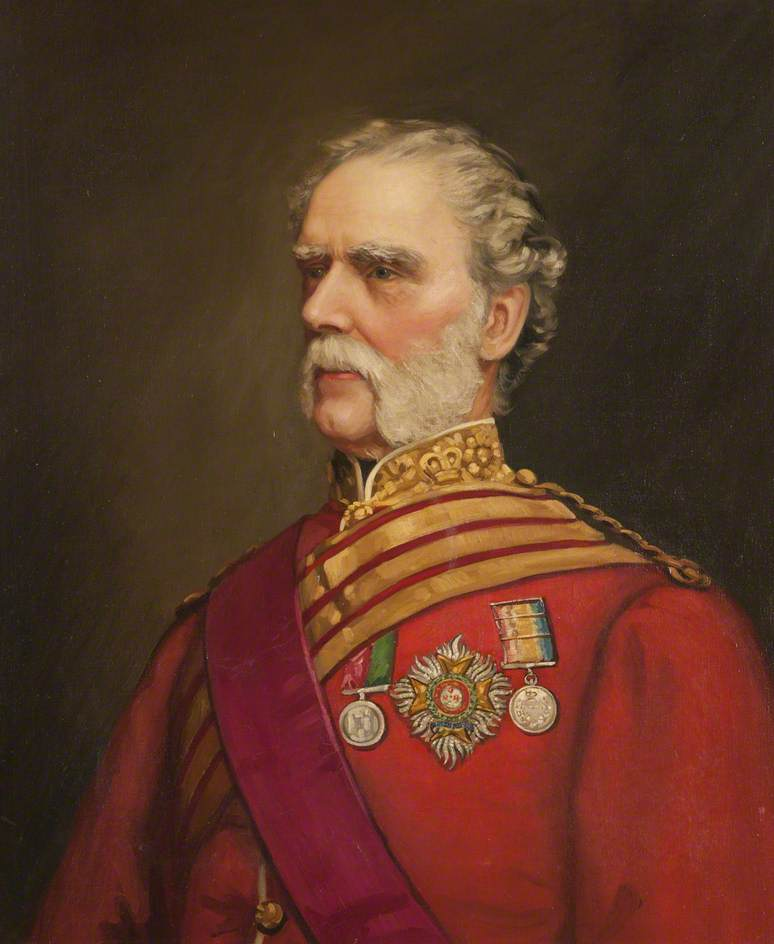
General Sir William Wyllie, colonel of the regiment in the 1870s

=== Formation ===
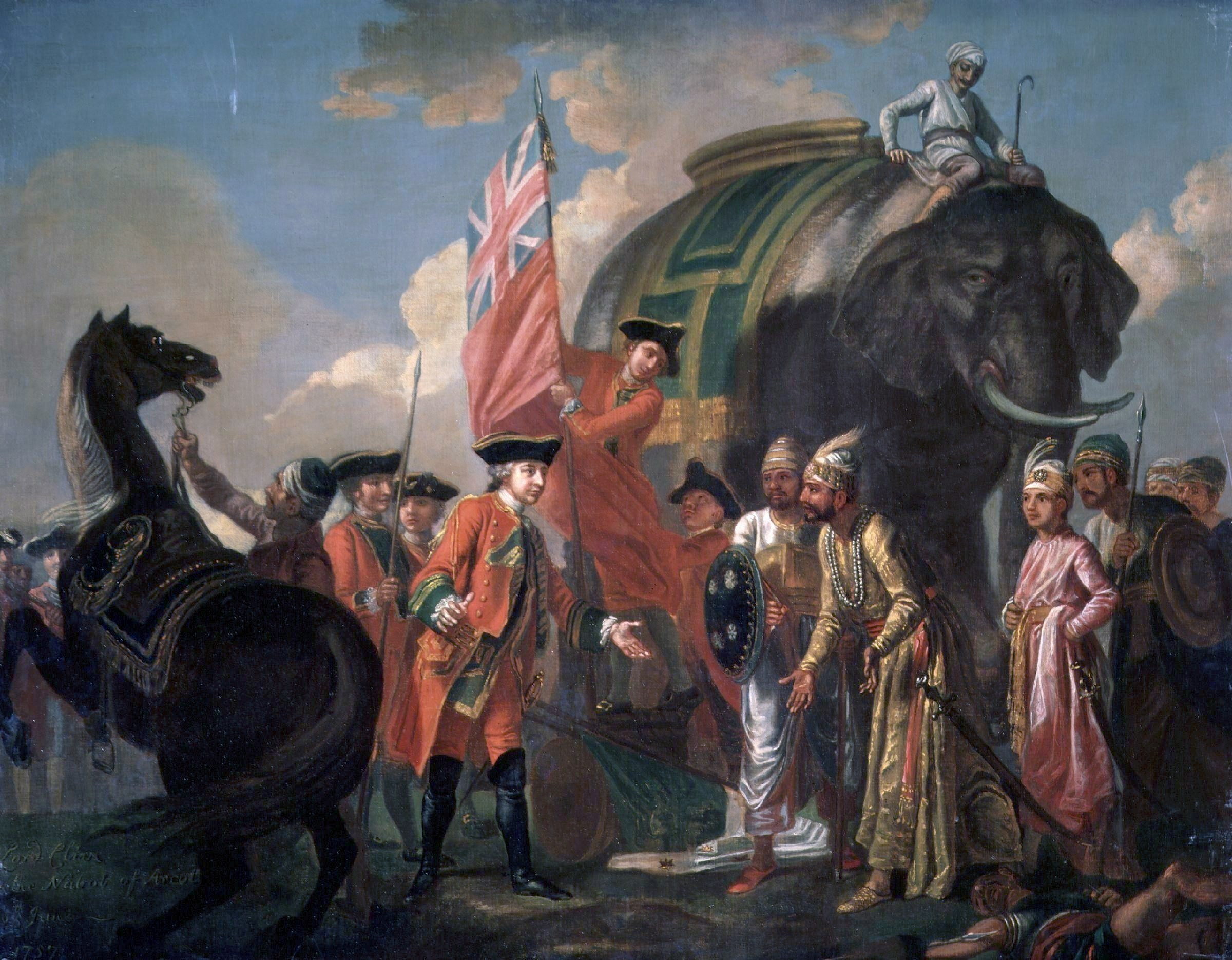
Lord Clive meeting with Mir Jafar after the Battle of Plassey, oil on canvas (Francis Hayman, c.1762

The regiment was originally raised in England as independent companies of European soldiers to garrison Bombay in February 1662. It embarked for India later that year and was transferred to the Honourable East India Company as The Bombay Regiment in March 1668. In 1688 it was renamed The Bombay (European) Regiment – "European" indicating it was composed of white soldiers, not Indian sepoys. The regiment saw action at the Battle of Plassey in June 1757 during the Seven Years' War. It also fought at the Battle of Buxar in October 1764 during the Oude Campaign. It next saw action at the siege of Seringapatam in February 1792 during the Third Anglo-Mysore War. It fought at the Battle of Seedaseer in March 1799 and the siege of Seringapatam in April 1799 during the Fourth Anglo-Mysore War.

=== Early nineteenth century ===
The regiment fought at the Battle of Khadki in November 1817 during the Third Anglo-Maratha War. It then embarked for the Arabian Peninsula in October 1820 and saw action in operations against Omani pirates at Jalan Bani Bu Ali in March 1821.

=== The Victorian era ===
The regiment took part in the Conquest of Aden in 1839 and was then renumbered as the 1st Bombay (European) Regiment later in the year (on the creation of the 2nd Bombay (European) Regiment), and designated the 1st Bombay (European) Fusiliers in 1844. It took part in the siege of Multan in April 1848 and the Battle of Gujrat in February 1849 during the Second Anglo-Sikh War. It also fought at various skirmishes during the Indian Rebellion.

After the Crown took control of the Presidency armies in the aftermath of the Mutiny, the regiment became the 1st Bombay Fusiliers in November 1859 and then the 1st Royal Bombay Fusiliers in May 1861. It was then renumbered as the 103rd Regiment of Foot (Royal Bombay Fusiliers) on transfer to the British Army in September 1862. (Note: "Her Majesty's Government have expressed an anxious desire to preserve the proud recollections of distinguished service which belong especially to the older Regiments of each Presidency, and to incorporate with Her Majesty's Army, Corps which have so greatly contributed to the acquisition and maintenance of Her Majesty's Dominions in the East. Her Majesty having graciously determined to mark Her estimation of the services of Her Indian Armies, by conferring the designation of "Royal" upon three of the European Regiments, and by selecting for this honour one Regiment from each Presidency...has much gratification in announcing that the following Regiments will henceforward bear the honourable designation of "Royal" Regiments... The 1st Bombay Fusiliers. The...older Regiments in the several Presidencies will thus be converted into Regiments of Her Majesty's General Army, and will be numbered and designated as follows... The 103rd Regiment of Foot (Royal Bombay Fusiliers).) The regiment arrived in England in February 1871.

As part of the Cardwell Reforms of the 1870s, where single-battalion regiments were linked together to share a single depot and recruiting district in the United Kingdom, the 103rd was linked with the 102nd Regiment of Foot (Royal Madras Fusiliers), and assigned to district no. 66 at Naas Barracks in County Kildare. On 1 July 1881 the Childers Reforms came into effect and the regiment amalgamated with the 102nd Regiment of Foot (Royal Madras Fusiliers) to form the Royal Dublin Fusiliers.

== Battle honours ==
The regiment received the following battle honours granted by the Honourable East India Company:

- Kirkee
- Beni Boo Ali
- Aden
- Mooltan
- Goojerat
- Punjaub

== Distinctions ==
In 1844 the regiment was granted a number of honorary distinctions recording its past service. The awards were made by the Governor-General of India on 6 November 1844 in the following terms: "With the approval of the Right Honourable the Governor-General of India in Council, the Honourable the Governor in Council is pleased to direct, that the honorary distinctions specified below be borne upon the Colours and appointments of the 1st Bombay European Regiment, Fusiliers":

- The Royal Tiger, superscribed Plassey and Buxar, for services in the Presidency of Bengal, during 1757 and 1764-1765, especially at the battles of Plassey and Buxar and the sieges of Chandernagore, Chunar, and Allahabad.
- The Elephant superscribed Carnatic and Mysore, for services on the Coromandel Coast, in the Carnatic and Mysore, during the years 1747-8-9; 1754-5, 1760, 1764 and 1788, especially as having shared in the defence of Cuddalore (Fort St David), 16 June 1748, the operations under Admiral Boscawen, and the siege of Davi Cottah, the latter part of this and the beginning of the following year; the action with the French Army under Monsieur Maisin, between the Sugar Loaf and French Rocks on 16 August 1754, the sieges of Pondicherry and Mihie 1760-1; the sieges of Madura and Palamcottah in 1764; the storming of the Bednore Ghauts and Capture of Bednore in 1783, and the expedition in the first campaign against Seringapatam in 1790-1-2.
- Guzerat for service at several different periods; especially throughout the whole of General Goddard's Campaign, with the Bengal Brigade in 1780, and the storming of Ahmedabad, 15 January 1780.

== Regimental colonels ==
Colonels of the Regiment were:

- 1862–1873: Lt-Gen. Joseph Hale
- 1873–1881: Gen. Sir William Wyllie, GCB

== Sources ==
- Mainwaring, Arthur (1911). Crown and Company. The Historical Records of the 2nd Battalion Royal Dublin Fusiliers, formerly the 1st Bombay European Regiment, 1662-1911. London: Arthur L Humphreys.
- Sumner, Ian (2001). British Colours & Standards 1747–1881 (2) Infantry. Oxford: Osprey Publishing. ISBN 978-1-84176-201-2.
