= John Spurgin =

English physician

John Spurgin (1796–1866) was an English physician. He is known as a medical writer, inventor, and follower of the works of Emanuel Swedenborg.

== Life ==
The son of William Spurgin, a farmer, he was born at Orplands, Bradwell-on-Sea, Essex. His father was a landowner and lord of the manor at nearby Brightlingsea.

Spurgin was educated at Chelmsford grammar school from 1804. At some point he served a medical apprenticeship, with a doctor in Richmond, Yorkshire. There, in 1812, he met the Swedenborgian and army officer George Blakiston Robinson, maternal uncle of James John Garth Wilkinson; Spurgin early studied the works of Emanuel Swedenborg, whose ideas he gradually adopted. He was a pupil at St Thomas's Hospital 1813–15. William Charles Wells in 1813 was there, expounding on beauty and progress, natural selection and racial theory.

On 3 July 1814, Spurgin was admitted to Caius College, Cambridge. Before he took up his place, he wrote in 1815 to John Keats, giving in a long letter an exposition of Swedenborg's views. They were acquainted by this time; Keats had then, in late 1815, just begun medical studies at Guy's Hospital, and he and Spurgin had briefly both been dressers together at Guy's. Internal evidence in the letter shows that they both, briefly, were staying at the time it was written in St Thomas Street, by St Thomas's Hospital.

Spurgin was a scholar from Michaelmas 1815 when he matriculated at Caius College, to Michaelmas 1816. He went to Edinburgh University, and, returning to Cambridge, graduated M.B. 1820, and M.D. 1825. He was admitted an inceptor candidate of the Royal College of Physicians of London on 30 September 1822, a candidate 30 September 1825, and a fellow on 30 September 1826. He was censor in 1829, and conciliarius in 1851–3 and 1862–4. He delivered the Harveian oration in 1851 and the college lectures on materia medica in 1852. Spurgin was physician to the Foundling Hospital from 1835 to his death, and around 1837 became physician to St Mark's Hospital.

With a flourishing private practice, Spurgin was first at 38 Guildford Street, Russell Square, from 1820, and at 17 Great Cumberland Street, Hyde Park, from 1853 to his death. He was injured by thieves in Bishopsgate Street on 20 September 1865; and died at 17 Great Cumberland Street, on 20 March 1866. He is buried on the eastern side of Highgate Cemetery. His portrait hung in the Royal College of Physicians.

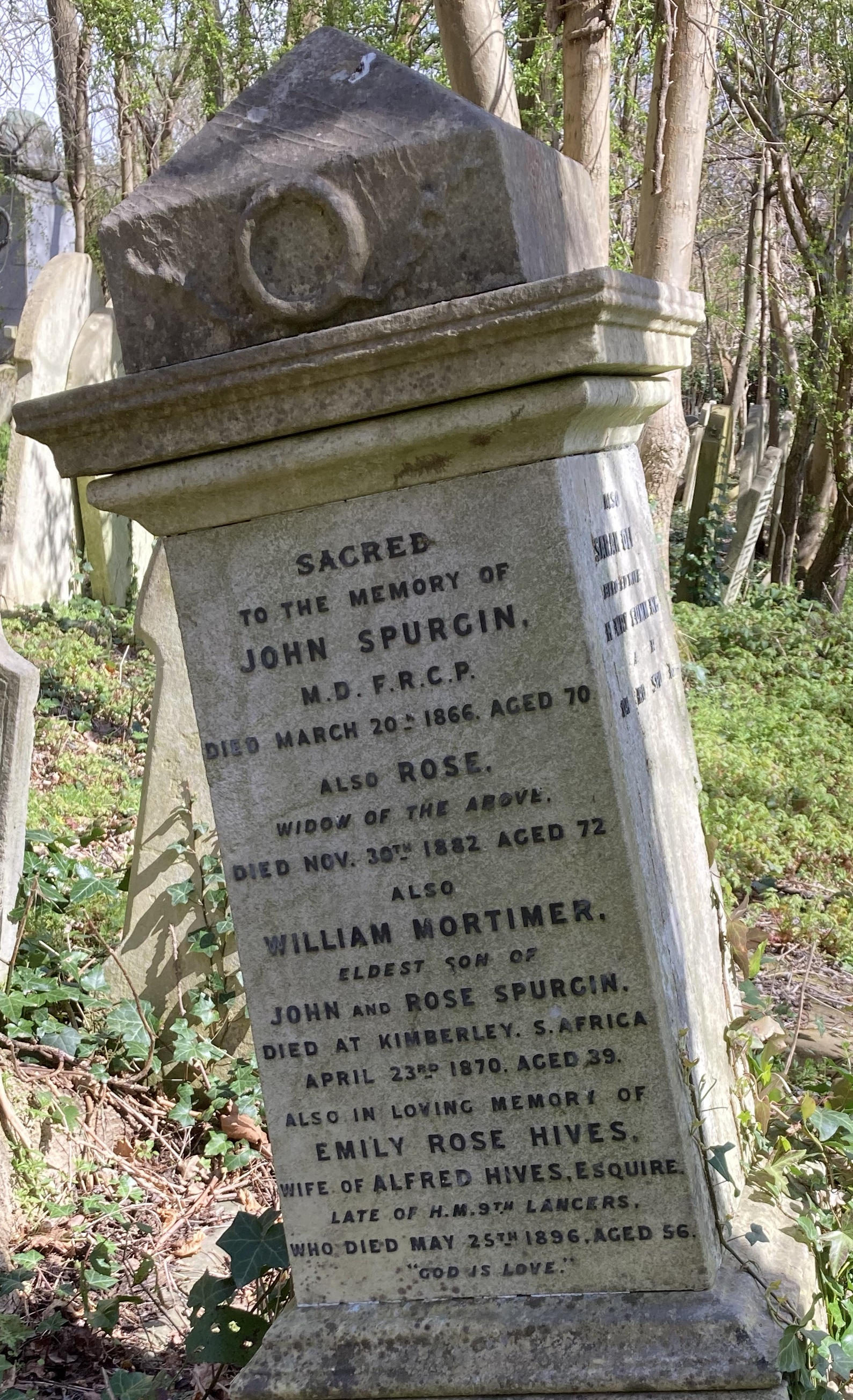
Grave of John Spurgin in Highgate Cemetery

== Inventor ==
Spurgin was the inventor and patentee of an "endless ladder", for use in scaffolding, which came into general use. He developed a thermoscope for taking the temperature of the body. He also worked on mining equipment with Percival Norton Johnson. This was at Beer Alston, deep under the River Tamar, with an engine that operated to 1860; a model of the mine was shown at the Great Exhibition 1851.

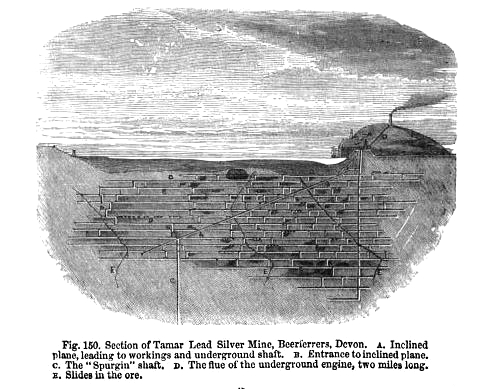
Tamar mine, 1866 engraving showing the inclined plane gallery and the Spurgin Shaft

== Works ==
Spurgin gave a personal account in a lecture read before the Swedenborg Association on 24 February 1847, and published in the same year as A Narrative of Personal Experience concerning Principles advocated by the Swedenborg Association. He also planned an edition of Swedenborg's philosophical works in translation. The only volume published was The Introduction to an Anatomical, Physical, and Philosophical Investigation of the Economy of the Animal Kingdom, with an address to the reader by "Medicus Cantabrigiensis", 1861.

Spurgin's other works were:

- Six Lectures on Materia Medica and its Relation to the Animal Economy, 1853.
- The Physician for All, his Philosophy, Experience, and his Mission, 1855; second curriculum, 1857, dedicated to Lord Palmerston.
- Drainage of Cities, reserving their sewage for use and keeping their rivers clean, 1858.
- The Cure of the Sick not Allopathy nor Homœopathy, but Judgment, 1860.

== Family ==
Spurgin married in 1816 Eliza Walsham Dax (or Walshman), daughter of T. Dax of Acton. His eldest son, John Blick Spurgin (1821–1903), an army officer, was her son. He married in 1835 Rose Down (1809/10–1882) of Colney Hatch, who died on 30 November 1882. They had a family of at least six children.
