= William Wyllie (Indian Army officer) =

General Sir William Wyllie GCB
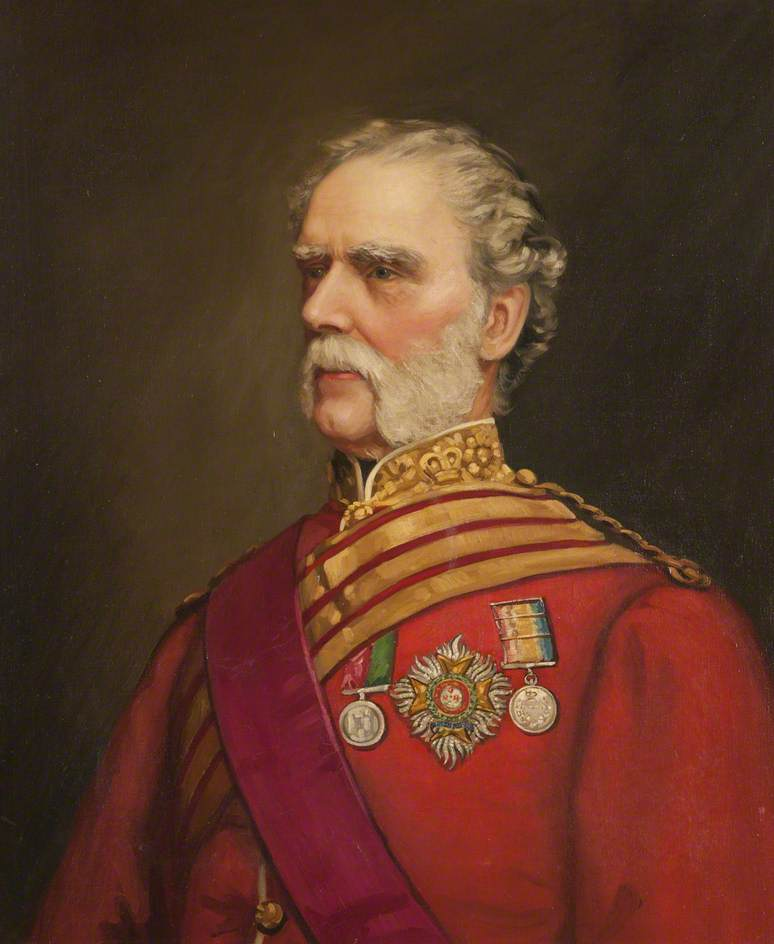
- Born: 13 August 1802; Kilmarnock, Ayrshire, Scotland
- Died: 26 May 1891 (aged 88); London, England
- Military career
- Allegiance: British India
- Branch: British Indian Army
- Service years: 1819–1858
- Rank: General
- Unit: Bombay Native Infantry
- Commands: Bombay Garrison; Brigade at Ahmadnagar
- Conflicts: Conquest of Sindh
- Awards: Knight Grand Cross of the Order of the Bath

General Sir William Wyllie GCB (13 August 1802 – 26 May 1891) was a British Indian Army officer.

== Military career ==
Wyllie was commissioned as an ensign in the Bombay Native Infantry on 30 April 1819. He was severely wounded at the Battle of Miani in February 1843. He became deputy adjutant-general of the Bombay Army in January 1849, commander of the Bombay Garrison in April 1850 and commander of the brigade at Ahmadnagar in February 1855.

He became colonel of the 109th Regiment of Foot in 1862 and colonel of the 103rd Regiment of Foot on 14 February 1873.

== Family ==
Wyllie married Amelia Hutt, sister of Sir William Hutt. Their three sons, John William Shaw Wyllie (1835–1870), Francis Robert Shaw Wyllie (4 June 1837 – 1907), and Curzon Wyllie, all were known in British India.
