= Royal Dublin Fusiliers =

Irish infantry regiment of the British Army

The Royal Dublin Fusiliers
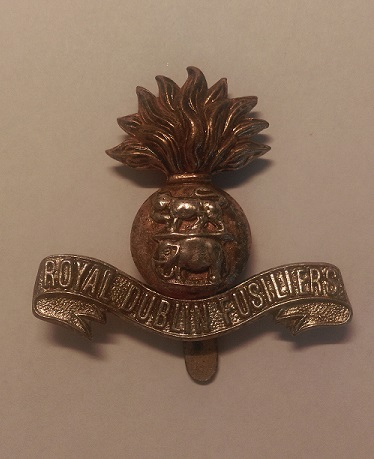
- Royal Dublin Fusiliers Cap Badge
- Active: 1 July 1881 – 31 July 1922
- Country: United Kingdom of Great Britain and Ireland
- Branch: British Army
- Type: Line Infantry
- Garrison/HQ: RHQ: Naas Barracks, Naas, County Kildare
- Nicknames: The Blue Caps, The Dubs, The Lambs, The Old Toughs
- March: Quick: The British Grenadiers; Unofficial: The Dublin Fusiliers

Commanders
- Colonel-in-Chief: Prince Arthur, Duke of Connaught and Strathearn (1908)
- Colonel of the Regiment: Major-General Charles Duncan Cooper (1910)

Insignia
- Hackle: Blue over Green

The Royal Dublin Fusiliers was an infantry regiment of the British Army created in 1881 and disbanded in 1922. It was one of eight 'Irish' regiments of the army which were raised and garrisoned in Ireland, with the regiment's home depot being located in Naas. The regiment was created via the amalgamation of the Royal Bombay Fusiliers and Royal Madras Fusiliers, two army regiments stationed in India, with militia units from Dublin and Kildare as part of the Childers Reforms. Both battalions of the regiment served in the Second Boer War.

During World War I, a further six battalions were raised and the regiment saw action on the Western Front, the Mediterranean and the Middle East, during which its members won three Victoria Cross medals. Following the establishment of the Irish Free State in 1922, five army regiments whose traditional recruiting grounds were located in the new state, including the Royal Dublin Fusiliers, were disbanded.

== History ==
=== Early history ===
The regiment was created on 1 July 1881 as a result of Childers Reforms by the amalgamation of the 102nd Regiment of Foot (Royal Madras Fusiliers) and the 103rd Regiment of Foot (Royal Bombay Fusiliers). Both the fusilier regiments had originated as "European" regiments of the East India Company and transferred to the British Army in 1861 when the British Crown took control of the company's private army after the Indian Rebellion of 1857. Under the reforms five infantry battalions were given Irish territorial titles and the 102nd and 103rd Regiments of Foot became the 1st and 2nd Battalions, The Royal Dublin Fusiliers.

It was one of eight Irish regiments raised largely in Ireland, and served the counties of Dublin, Kildare, Wicklow and Carlow, with its garrison depot located at Naas. Militarily, the whole of Ireland was administered as a separate command within the United Kingdom with Command Headquarters at Parkgate (Phoenix Park) Dublin, directly under the War Office in London. Many of those killed while on service with the regiment and some of their relatives are buried in the Grangegorman Military Cemetery.

The 102nd was based in Ceylon (now Sri Lanka) when it became the 1st Battalion. It moved back to the UK in 1886, being based in England, before moving to the Curragh in Ireland. It returned to England in 1893, remaining there until the Second Boer War began in South Africa in 1899: it arrived in South Africa in November 1899.

When the 103rd became the 2nd Battalion, it was based in England before moving to sunnier climes in 1884, when it was posted to Gibraltar. The following year it arrived in Egypt and then moved to India in 1889, being located in a variety of places there. In 1897 the 2nd Dublins was based in Natal Colony, where it would still be when the Boer War began in 1899.

=== Second Boer War ===
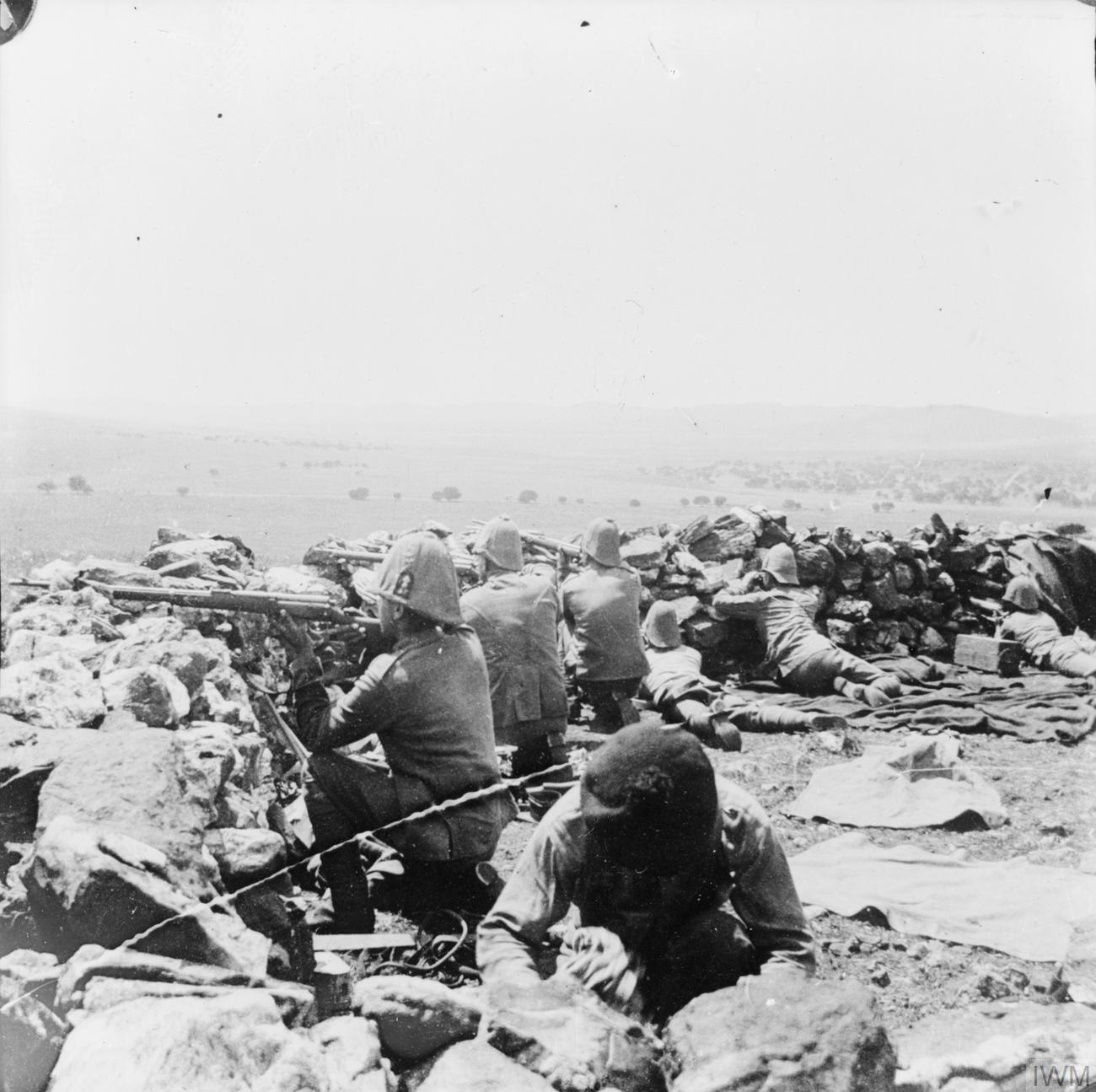
Royal Dublin Fusiliers during the Second Boer War, 1899–1902 (IWM Q72298)

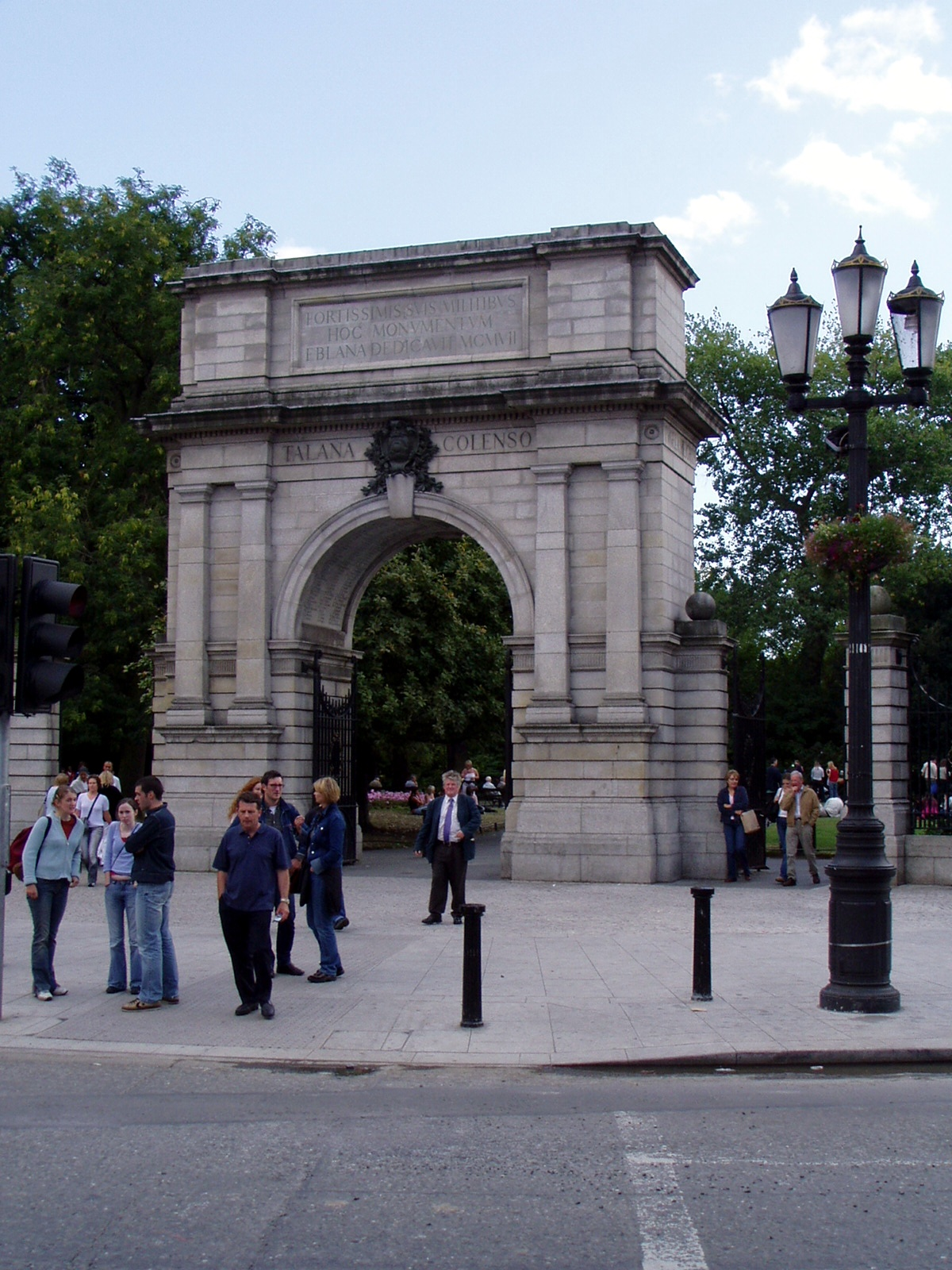
Fusiliers' Arch, nicknamed "Traitors' Gate" by Irish Republicans, commemorates the Royal Dublin Fusiliers killed in the Second Boer War, St Stephen's Green, Dublin

The Boers declared war on 12 October and invaded Natal and the Cape Colony. On 20 October the 2nd Dublins took part in the first major battle of the war, the Battle of Talana Hill near Dundee. The Boers had appeared on Talana Hill in the early morning and after they launched a few shells at Dundee, the garrison responded and attacked the hill. The 2nd Dublins took part in the attack and, after some fierce fighting, removed the Boers. They suffered heavy casualties in the process, losing, amongst others, Captain George Anderson Weldon, the first officer of the Dublins to be killed in the war. The British had to abandon Dundee soon afterwards, withdrawing to Ladysmith. The Boers besieged the town in late October. On 30 October the garrison's commander, Sir George Stuart White VC, ordered an attack on Lombard's Kop which the Dublin Fusiliers took part in.

On 15 November 1899, a detachment of Dubliners and the Durban Light Infantry were garrisoning an armoured train operating from Estcourt with the objective of monitoring Boer movements. The Boers ambushed them on their return and a section of the train was de-railed in the chaos. Among the passengers was Winston Churchill, then a war correspondent accompanying the detachment, who helped load the train engine with wounded before it made an escape attempt, pushing through the de-railed section that blocked its path and making it through safely. The remaining troops put up a stout defence until they were eventually compelled to surrender, including Churchill who had returned to the remaining defenders. Churchill later made a successful escape attempt from his prison in Pretoria. He wrote glowingly of the gallantry displayed by the Dublin Fusiliers and the other troops that were present during the ambush. The Dublins lost three men during the ambush.

The Dublin Fusiliers actively took part in the efforts to lift the Siege of Ladysmith, which lasted from 30 October 1899 to 28 February 1900. On 15 December the 2nd Dublins took part in the Battle of Colenso. The Dublins were part of the 5th Brigade (known as the Irish Brigade) who crossed the wrong part of the Tugela River and suffered heavy casualties in the process. The battle was a defeat for the British forces and became part of a notorious period for the British in the war, known as "Black Week". The defeat, however, did not discourage further attempts being made. The Dublins did not participate in any more attempts until January 1900 when they took part in the Tugela campaign, collectively known as the Battle of the Tugela Heights. February saw the Dublins take part in heavy fighting before, on 27 February, they supported the Royal Irish Fusiliers in their final charge on Pieters Hill, suffering heavy casualties though taking the position. This victory led to the siege of Ladysmith being lifted the following day by cavalry, with the main force of infantry arriving on 3 March. On 10 March 1900 Queen Victoria decreed that a sprig of shamrock be adorned on the headdress of Irish units on Saint Patrick's Day to commemorate their actions in South Africa. This tradition remains in existence with Irish units of the British Army.

In May, the British began their advance towards the Transvaal, one of the Boer republics, and early the following month the Dublins took part in the effort against Laing's Nek during the attempt to achieve an entry into the Transvaal. This was successfully achieved and the capital, Pretoria, was captured on 5 June. The war, however, did not end and the Boers began a guerrilla campaign against the British. During this phase of the war, many blockhouses were constructed to help restrict the movement of the Boer guerrillas and men of the Dublin Fusiliers helped to garrison them. This phase of the war also saw the mounted infantry companies, among which were Dublin Fusiliers MI, in their element, hunting the (now small) groups of Boers. The Dublin Fusiliers also took part in the hunt for Christiaan de Wet, a prominent Boer officer.

The last of the Boers surrendered in May 1902, the Treaty of Vereeniging formally ending the conflict. During the war, volunteers from the three militia battalions of the Dublins had been used to provide reinforcements for the two regular battalions fighting in South Africa. The 2nd Dublins had left South Africa in January 1902. The Dublins suffered nearly 700 casualties (killed, wounded, missing) during the conflict, many of whom died of disease, indeed the vast majority of British Army casualties were from disease.

The 4th (Militia) battalion, formed from the Royal Dublin City Militia in 1881, was one of the reserve battalions. It was embodied in May 1900, disembodied in December the same year, and later re-embodied for service in South Africa during the Second Boer War. 17 officers and 524 men returned aboard Cestrian, arriving at Queenstown (now Cobh) on 2 October 1902.

A music hall song commemorating the bravery of the fusiliers was entitled: "What Do You Think of the Irish Now?" by Albert Hall and Harry Castling. One of the verses said: "You used to call us traitors/ Because of agitators/ But you can't call us traitors now."

After the end of the Boer War the 1st Battalion was sent to Malta on the SS Dominion in November 1902, and was transferred to Crete and Cyprus, both in the Mediterranean, where it was stationed from March 1903. It was posted to Egypt in 1906, where it later received its Colours at Alexandria by the regiment's Colonel-in-Chief, Prince Arthur, Duke of Connaught and Strathearn. The 1st Dublins later joined the British garrison in India, the then overseas 'home' of the British Army, remaining there until the outbreak of war in 1914.

Upon the conclusion of the war, the 2nd Battalion returned to the UK, being based in Buttevant, County Cork, Ireland. It left for Aldershot, England in 1910, where it received its new colours from the regiment's Colonel-in-Chief the following year. It remained in England until war began in 1914.

In 1908, the Volunteers and Militia were reorganised nationally, with the former becoming the Territorial Force and the latter the Special Reserve. The regiment now had three Reserve but no Territorial battalions.

=== First World War ===
The First World War began in August 1914, and the British Empire declared war on Germany after it invaded Belgium. The regiment raised 6 battalions during the war (11 in total), serving on the Western Front, Gallipoli, Middle East and Salonika. The Dublin Fusiliers received 3 Victoria Crosses (VC), the highest award for bravery in the face of the enemy, and was also awarded 48 battle honours and 5 theatre honours. The regiment lost just over 4,777 during the war.

==== Western Front ====
The 2nd Dublins arrived in France in the month war was declared as part of the 10th Brigade in the 4th Division. The Division was part of the British Expeditionary Force (BEF), the professionals of the old regular army, known as the 'Old Contemptibles' after a comment made by the German Kaiser. The 2nd Dublins took part in the retreat following the Battle of Mons, taking part in their first engagement on 26 August 1914 at Le Cateau that helped delay the German advance towards Paris, inflicting such heavy casualties that the Germans thought they faced more machine-guns than they actually did. The BEF then resumed their retreat, but many men, including from the Dublin Fusiliers, were stranded behind German lines, and many were taken prisoner by the Germans. The battalion, badly depleted, later took part in the Battle of the Marne (5–9 September) that finally halted the German advance just on the outskirts of Paris, forcing the Germans to retreat to the Aisne. There, the 2nd Dublins took part in the Battle of the Aisne and later took part in their last major engagement of the war, at the Battle of Messines, which began on 12 October and ended on 2 November.

The 2nd Dublins took part in all but one of the subsidiary battles during Second Ypres that took place between 22 April – 24 May 1915. The battalion suffered heavily at the Battle of St Julien, the second subsidiary battle, incurring hundreds of casualties. They had no respite, taking part in the next two subsidiary battles at Frezenberg and Bellewaarde. On 24 May the battalion was subject to a German poison gas attack near Saint-Julien and effectively disintegrated as a fighting unit. The British at that time had no defences against gas attack; indeed the large-scale use of gas by the Germans on the Western Front had begun at Second Ypres. The 2nd Dublins' commanding officer, Lieutenant Colonel Arthur Loveband of Naas, died the following day. The battalion did not take part in any more major battles for the rest of the year.

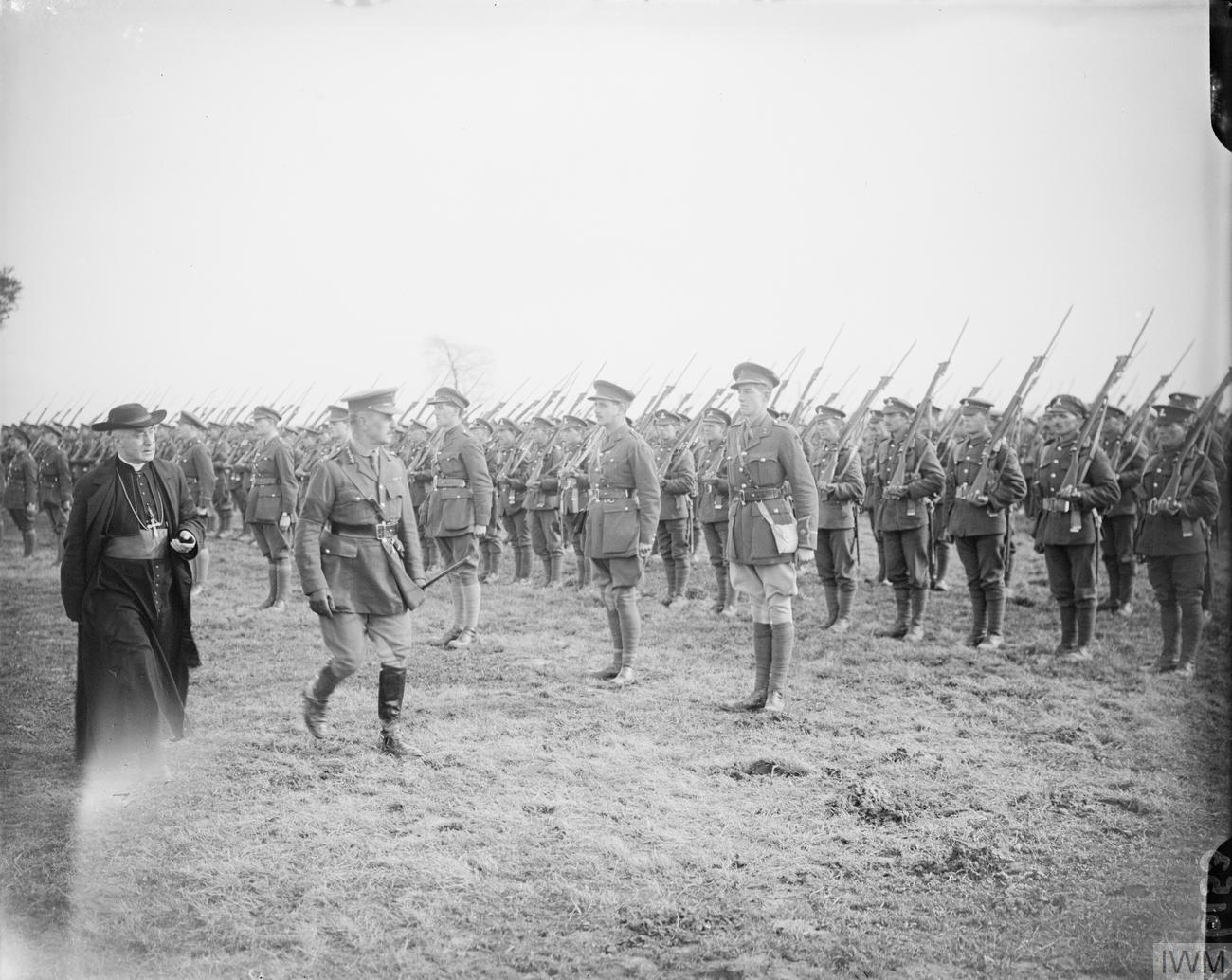
Cardinal Francis Bourne, the Head of the Catholic Church in England and Wales, and Major-General William Hickie, the Commander of the 16th Irish Division, inspecting troops of the 8/9th Battalion, Royal Dublin Fusiliers (48th Brigade, 16th Division) at Ervillers, 27 October 1917 (IWM Q6153)

The 8th and 9th Dublins, who had arrived in France in December 1915 as part of the 48th Brigade in the 16th (Irish) Division, were also subject to a German gas attack at the Battle of Hulluch, near Loos, on 27 April 1916, suffering heavy casualties. There had been trouble at home that month in Dublin when the Easter Rising had taken place; in spite of this, the Dublin Fusiliers still performed with dedication to their duty. The British launched the Somme offensive on 1 July and the 1st and 2nd Dublins took part in the First day on the Somme that saw the British forces sustain heavy casualties; some 57,000, over 19,000 of which were killed. The 8th and 9th Dublins took part in their first major battle during the Somme offensive, taking part in the capture of Ginchy on 9 September, in which Lieutenant Tom Kettle fell in action. The Dublins also took part in the last major battle of the offensive, at the Ancre that took place between 13–18 November. The Dublins, once again, had suffered large numbers of casualties during the Somme offensive.

In March 1917 the Germans retreated to the Hindenburg Line which was a formidable series of defences that the Germans had constructed. In April the British launched the Arras Offensive and the Dublin Fusiliers took part in the two battles of the Scarpe that took place in April. The 10th Dublins took part in the Battle of Arleux (28–29 April) that saw the Dublins last involvement in a major battle of the Arras offensive. Half of the French Army, exhausted and angry at the enormous losses it had sustained, mutinied, refusing to fight unless it was to defend against German attacks. This compelled the British Army to take the leading role, and this would see the Dublin Fusiliers take part in further offensives before the year ended. In June, the Dublins took part in the capture of Wytschaete during the Battle of Messines. The regiment's battalions subsequently took part in the Third Battle of Ypres (31 July –10 November), being involved in several of its subsidiary battles, including at Langemarck. As during Second Ypres, the regiment suffered heavily, indeed the 9th Dublins had sustained such losses that they effectively ceased to be a fighting unit, and were amalgamated with the 8th Dublins in October, forming the 8th/9th Dublins. The regiment's last major action of 1917 was a diversionary attack during the Battle of Cambrai (28 November – 3 December).

In February 1918, due to the heavy losses that had been sustained, the 8th/9th and 10th Dublins were disbanded and its men were transferred to the 1st and 2nd Dublins. On 21 March the regiment was on the defensive during the Battle of St. Quentin when the Germans began an immense bombardment as part of their last-gasp major offensive known as Operation Michael against British and Empire forces in the Picardy area. The 1st and 2nd Dublins suffered heavily from the intense bombardment (which included poison gas) and when the Germans attacked shortly afterwards, the Germans broke through the shattered remnants. The Germans made significant gains but their offensive gradually lost momentum and the Germans were pushed back by April. During that month, on 14 April, the 1st and 2nd Dublins had to briefly amalgamate due to the losses it had sustained during the German offensive, forming the 1st/2nd Dublins. The 1st Battalion was reconstituted a few days later with drafts from the 2nd Battalion, which was reduced to cadre strength. On 26 April the 1st Dublins left the 16th (Irish) and rejoined the 86th Brigade, 29th Division. In June the 2nd Dublins transferred to the 31st Division and was reconstituted. It was transferred to the Lines of Communication (LoC) before moving to 50th Division in July. In August the Allies launched their counter-offensive against the Germans and eventually reached the Hindenburg Line. The Allies launched their offensive against the Line in September, and the 1st, 2nd, and 7th Dublins, took part in the battles of the St Quentin Canal, Cambrai and Beaurevoir, and the Hindenburg Line was successfully breached by the Allies. The Dublins took part in the last offensives of the war, taking part in, among others, the Fourth Battle of Ypres, Battle of Courtrai and the Battle of the Selle during September and October. The 1st Dublins lost their commanding officer, Lieutenant Colonel Athelstan Moore, on 14 October. The regiment's last major battle was in the Battle of the Sambre on 4 November. The war ended on the Western Front with the Armistice on 11 November 1918.

==== Gallipoli, Salonika and the Middle East ====
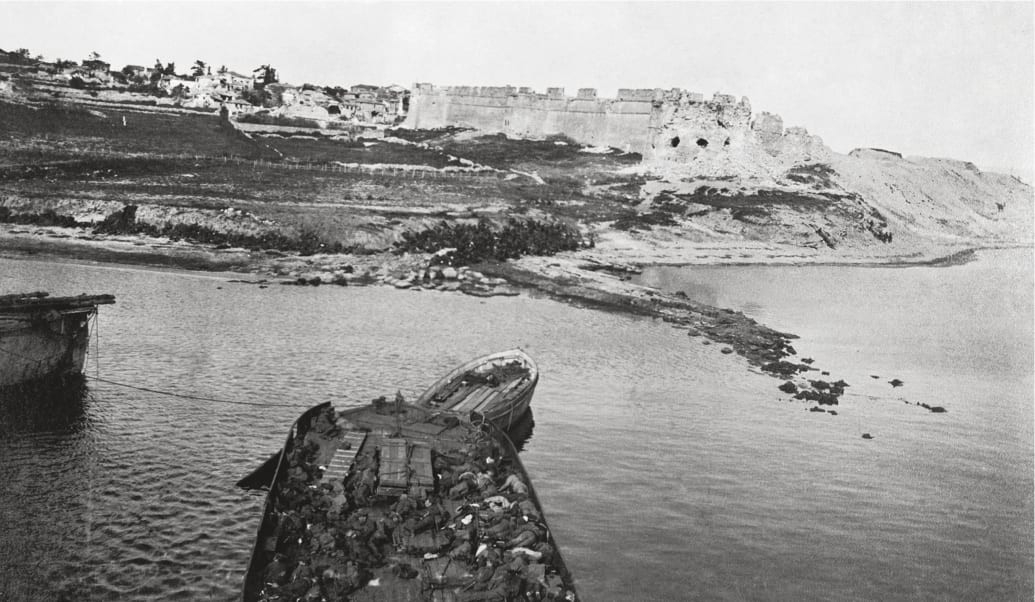
V Beach, viewed from the SS River Clyde on 25 April 1915

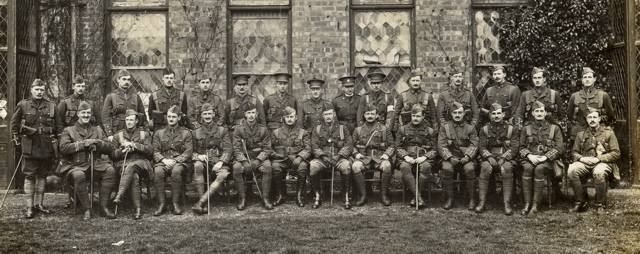
Officers of the 1st Battalion, Royal Dublin Fusiliers, March 1915. This photo was likely taken in Torquay, Devon, prior to embarkation to Gallipoli.

The 1st, 6th and 7th Dublins all took part in the Allied Gallipoli Campaign in the Dardanelles after Turkey joined the Central Powers in November 1914. It was an effort to support Russia by keeping the Dardanelles Strait open. The 1st Dublins, as part of 86th Brigade of the 29th Division, landed at V Beach, Cape Helles on 25 April. The 1st Dublins were the first to land, landing via boats that were either towed or rowed, and suffered heavy casualties from a withering hail of machine-gun fire from the Turkish defenders, most not even getting out of their boats, while others drowned in the attempt, most due to the equipment they carried. The 1st Royal Munsters, two companies of the 2nd Royal Hampshires and a company of the 1st Dublins, landed from the SS River Clyde soon afterwards and were also decimated by machine-gun fire. In spite of the severe casualties, the British forces managed to land large numbers of troops by nightfall. On the morning of 26 April the British force, including the Dublins, took the fortress, led by Lieutenant Colonel Doughty-Wylie, before moving onto the village of Sedd el Bahr. Lieutenant-Colonel Doughty-Wylie and Captain Walford (who helped organise the attack) both died at the moment of victory. The 1st Battalion sustained just over 600 casualties within the first two days, out of a total of just over 1000 men that had landed. Nearly all of their officers, including Lieutenant Colonel Richard Alexander Rooth, had been killed on the day of the landings. The battalion and the 1st Munsters had suffered so heavily that they had to form a composite battalion known as the 'Dubsters' on 30 April. Both battalions regained their identity the following month after they received a sufficient amount of replacements. During their time at Helles, the 1st Dublins took part in the numerous attempts to capture Krithia; the first attempt took place on 28 April.

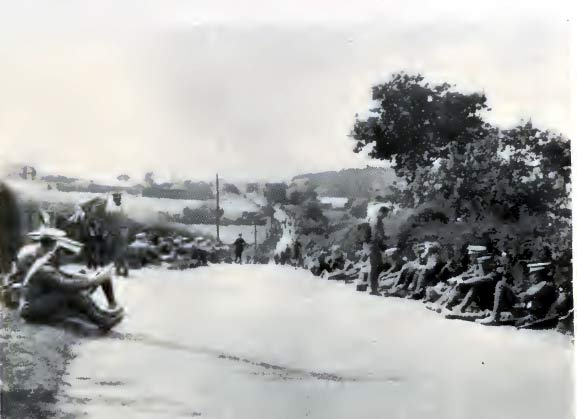
The 6th Dubin Fusiliers on a route march near Basingstoke, Hampshire, 1915

The 6th and 7th Dublins joined the 30th Brigade of the 10th (Irish) Division upon their creation in August 1914. The division left Ireland for Basingstoke, England in May 1915. On 7 June the division left the UK under the command of Irish General Bryan Mahon, arriving in Lemnos by late July in preparation for the landings at Suvla Bay, Gallipoli. The Dublins landed at Suvla on 7 August; a day after the first landings there had taken place. Unlike at V Beach at Helles, Suvla was barely defended but incompetence at the higher echelons of command led to the British troops not exploiting their early advantage, ensuring that the Suvla landings became static and allowing the Turks to reinforce their defences. The Dublins took part in the effort to capture a position known as Chocolate Hill (7–8 August), which was successfully taken, though at a heavy cost. On 9 August the Dublins took part in the attempt to recapture Scimitar Hill, and managed to gain some ground but experienced ferocious resistance from the Turks that eventually forced the British to withdraw. The 1st Dublins and the rest of the 29th Division were moved to Suvla to reinforce the British force there. On 21 August the Dublins took part in another attempt to take Scimitar Hill and after the battle, the Suvla front-line became static, with no more major attacks being attempted. In September, the 6th and 7th Dublins and the rest of their division left Suvla, arriving in Mudros on Lemnos later that month.

On 1 January 1916, the 1st Dublins left Gallipoli for Egypt with the rest of the 29th Division and the last remaining British troops left Gallipoli on 9 January. The ironic thing was that the evacuation of Gallipoli by the Allies was, arguably, the most successful part of the campaign. The Dublins had suffered heavily, nearly all of the just over 1000 men of the 1st Dublins who had landed at Helles in April had been killed, wounded, experienced disease or were missing, but further carnage was to await them in France. The Dublin Fusiliers battalions that had seen service in Gallipoli had had a diverse composition, indeed D Company, 7th Dublins (known as the 'Dublin Pals' in much the same way as the Pals battalions) had a number of professional rugby players and most of the company had attended Trinity College, including Professor of Law Lieutenant Earnest Julian who was mortally wounded at Chocolate Hill and died on board a hospital ship, gaining the company the nickname 'The Toffs' which was in reference to the 2nd Dublins nickname, 'The Old Toughs'.

Meanwhile, the 6th and 7th Dublins had landed in Salonika in October 1915 as part of a British-French force requested by the Prime Minister of Greece, with the intention of assisting Serbia who had been invaded by Bulgaria, one of Germany's allies during the Macedonian campaign. By the time the British-French force had arrived, Serbia had been defeated but the Allies remained. The Dublins took part in the Battle of Kosturino (7–8 December) and in the British withdrawal from Serbia. After Kosturino, things were mostly quiet, though the British still suffered casualties from disease, such as dysentery and malaria, and also suffered from frostbite. In October 1916 the Dublins took part in the capture of the village of Yenikoi where they suffered heavy casualties, including friendly fire from their own artillery. In August 1917 the 6th and 7th, along with the rest of the 10th (Irish), were ordered to concentrate in Salonika in preparation for moving from the Balkans. The following month the division arrived in Egypt and then commenced their participation in the Palestine campaign. The campaign was a much more successful one than the previous two campaigns that the regiment had experienced and the Dublins took part in the Third Battle of Gaza (27 October – 7 November). The Dublins also took part in the capture of Jerusalem and in its subsequent defence from Ottoman counter-attack. The 7th Dublins left the division, moving to France in April 1918 and was attached to the 16th (Irish) on 10 June. It was, however, absorbed by 11th Royal Irish Fusiliers only 8 days later. The 6th Dublins followed the 7th the following month, also heading for France. It joined the 66th Division in July.

=== 1916 Easter Rising ===
Three Battalions of the Royal Dublin Fusiliers attacked rebels in the Easter Rising of 1916 in Dublin. 11 of the Royal Dublin Fusiliers were killed and 35 more wounded. John Dillon, an Irish MP who was in Dublin during the Easter Rising, told the House of Commons "I asked Sir John Maxwell himself, "Have you any cause of complaint of the Dublins who had to go down and fight their own people in the streets of Dublin? Did a single man turn back and betray the uniform he wears?” He told me, "Not a man." At the court martial of Seán Heuston two Royal Dublin Fusiliers officers, Captain A W MacDermot and Lieutenant W P Connolly give evidence against Heuston that resulted in him being executed by firing squad on 8 May 1916.

==== Guinness brewery killings ====
On the night of 29 April 1916, a picket of the 5th Battalion, Royal Dublin Fusiliers stationed within the Guinness Brewery arrested and then shot dead William John Rice and Algernon Lucas. The same night, in a separate incident, Cecil Dockeray, and Basil Worsley-Warswick were shot. 2nd Lt Lucas and 2nd Lt Worsley-Warswick were officers in the King Edward's Horse, Rice and Dockeray were employees at the brewery. The four men were killed while carrying out routine inspections of the premises. Company quartermaster sergeant Robert Flood, commander of the picket and who ordered the executions was court-martialled, charged with the murders of Rice and Lucas but was acquitted, claiming in his defence that he believed the four to be members of Sinn Féin and that his picket was too small to guard the four prisoners. In the court martial, it was made clear that neither Rice nor Dockeray were connected to or sympathetic to Sinn Féin or the rising.

=== Disbandment ===
All the war-raised battalions were disbanded either during the war, or shortly afterwards. The 1st Dublins crossed the German border in early December. The battalion eventually reached Cologne where the British Army of the Rhine was based. The battalion returned to the UK a short while afterwards, based in Bordon. The 2nd Dublins left war-ravaged Europe to join the Allied Army of Occupation in Constantinople, Turkey and in late 1920 moved to Multan, India, before returning to the UK in 1922.

Due to substantial defence cuts, and the establishment of the Irish Free State (the predecessor of the Republic of Ireland) in 1922, it was agreed that the six former Southern Ireland regiments would be disbanded, including the Royal Dublin Fusiliers. On 12 June, five regimental Colours were laid up in a ceremony at St George's Hall, Windsor Castle in the presence of HM King George V. (The South Irish Horse sent a Regimental engraving because the regiment chose to have its standard remain in St Patrick's Cathedral, Dublin). The Dublin Fusiliers detachment included the commanding officers of the 1st Dublins and 2nd Dublins, lieutenant-colonels C. N. Perreau and G. S. Higgingson, who had been captured in France during the first year of World War I, and the regiment's Colonel-in-Chief, the Duke of Connaught. The Colours remain there as of 2005. The six regiments were all disbanded on 31 July 1922. With the outbreak of the Irish Civil War conflict some thousands of their ex-servicemen and officers chose to enlist in the Free State government's newly formed National Army. The British Army veterans brought considerable combat experience with them and by May 1923 comprised 50% of its 53,000 soldiers and 20% of its officers.

On 27 April 2001, the Irish government officially acknowledged the role of the soldiers of the Royal Dublin Fusiliers who fought in the First World War by hosting a State Reception at Dublin Castle for the Royal Dublin Fusiliers Association.

== Battalions ==
Battalions of the regiment throughout its existence were:

Formation

- 1st Battalion (Regular), disbanded 1922, former 102nd (Royal Madras Fusiliers) Regiment of Foot
- 2nd Battalion (Regular), disbanded 1922, former 103rd (Royal Bombay Fusiliers) Regiment of Foot
- 3rd (Kildare Rifles Militia) Battalion (Special Reserve), disbanded 1922
- 4th (Queen's Own Royal Dublin City Militia) Battalion (Extra Reserve), disbanded 1922
- 5th (Dublin County Light Infantry Militia) Battalion (Extra Reserve), disbanded 1922

First World War

- 6th (Service) Battalion, raised 1914, cadre 1918, disbanded 1919
- 7th (Service) Battalion, raised 1914, absorbed 1918 into 2nd Btn
- 8th (Service) Battalion, raised 1914, amalgamated 1918 and disbanded
- 9th (Service) Battalion, raised 1914, amalgamated 1918
- 10th (Service) Battalion, raised 1915, disbanded 1918
- 11th (Reserve) Battalion, raised 1916, disbanded 1918

== Victoria Cross recipients ==
- Sergeant Horace Augustus Curtis (2nd Battalion)- First World War, 13 October 1918
- Sergeant Robert Downie (2nd Battalion) - First World War, 23 October 1916
- Sergeant James Ockendon (1st Battalion) - First World War, 4 October 1917

== Battle honours ==
The regiment's battle honours were as follows:

- From 102nd Regiment of Foot: Arcot, Plassey, Condore^{1}, Wandiwash, Pondicherry, Nundy Droog, Amboyna, Ternate, Banda, Maheidpoor, Ava, Pegu, Lucknow
- From 103rd Regiment of Foot: Plassey, Buxar, Guzerat, Carnatic, Mysore, Seringapatam, Kirkee, Beni Boo Ali, Aden, Mooltan, Goojerat, Punjaub
- Siege of Ladysmith, South Africa 1899–1902
- First World War (11 Battalions): Le Cateau, Retreat from Mons, Marne 1914, Aisne 1914, Armentiéres 1914, Ypres 1915 '17 '18, St Julien, Frezenberg, Bellewaarde, Somme 1916 '18, Albert 1916, Guillemont, Ginchy, Le Transloy, Ancre 1916, Arras 1917, Scarpe 1917, Arleux, Messines 1917, Langemarck 1917, Polygon Wood, Cambrai 1917 and 1918, St Quentin, Bapaume 1918, Rosières, Avre, Hindenburg Line, St Quentin Canal, Beaurevoir, Courtrai, Selle, Sambre, France and Flanders 1914–18, Helles, Landing at Helles, Krithia, Suvla, Sari Bair, Landing at Suvla, Scimitar Hill, Gallipoli 1915–16, Egypt 1916, Gaza, Jerusalem, Tell 'Asur, Palestine 1917–18, Kosturino, Struma, Macedonia 1915–17

1. Awarded in error. The regiment was not present.

== Regimental colonels ==
Colonels of the regiment were:

- 1881–1887 (1st Battalion): Gen. Sir Robert Vivian, GCB (ex 102nd Foot)
- 1881–1891 (2nd Battalion): Gen. Sir William Wyllie, GCB (ex 103rd Foot)
- 1891–1895: Gen. Sir Robert Walter Macleod Fraser
- 1895–1903: Lt-Gen. Sir John Blick Spurgin, CSI
- 1903–1910: Maj-Gen. William Francis Vetch, CVO
- 1910–1922: Maj-Gen. Charles Duncan Cooper, CB
- 1922: Regiment disbanded

== Great War Memorials ==
- Irish National War Memorial Gardens, Dublin.
- Peace Park, Dublin.
- Island of Ireland Peace Park, Messines, Belgium.
- Menin Gate Memorial Ypres, Belgium.

== See also ==
- British Army Fusilier
- 102nd Regiment of Foot (Royal Madras Fusiliers)
- 103rd Regiment of Foot (Royal Bombay Fusiliers)

== Sources ==
- J.B.M. Frederick, Lineage Book of British Land Forces 1660-1978, Volume I, 1984: Microform Academic Publishers, Wakefield, United Kingdom. ISBN 1-85117-007-3.
- Aspinall-Oglander, C. F. (1929). Military Operations Gallipoli: Inception of the Campaign to May 1915. History of the Great War Based on Official Documents by Direction of the Historical Section of the Committee of Imperial Defence I (1st ed.). London: Heinemann.
- Cottrell, Peter (2008). The Irish Civil War 1922-23, Saorstát Éireann Forces. Osprey Publishing Ltd. ISBN 978-1-84603-270-7.
- Harris, Henry E.D. (1968). The Irish Regiments in the First World War. Cork: Mercier Press. ISBN 978-0853420729.
- McNally, Michael (2007). Easter Rising: Birth of the Irish Republic. Osprey Publishing Ltd. ISBN 978-1-84603-067-3.
- Murphy, David (2007). Irish Regiments in the World Wars. Osprey Publishing. ISBN 978-1-84603-015-4.
- Steel, Nigel; Hart, Peter (1994). Defeat at Gallipoli. Papermac. ISBN 0-330-49058-3.
- The Second Battalion Royal Dublin Fusiliers in the South African War by Arthur Edward Mainwaring and Cecil Francis Romer at Project Gutenberg
