= Siege of Nundydroog =

Battle of the Third Anglo-Mysore War

- Part of the Third Anglo-Mysore War
| Date | October 1 – October 19 1791 (2 weeks, 4 days) |
| Location | Nundydroog, Mysore, India 13.38626°N 77.70093°E |
| Result | British victory |

Belligerents
| Kingdom of Mysore | East India Company |

Commanders and leaders
| Tipu Sultan | (East India Company) Charles Cornwallis |

Casualties and losses
| | 130 killed or wounded |

The Siege of Nundydroog was conducted by British Indian forces under the command of General Charles Cornwallis in October 1791, during the Third Anglo-Mysore War. The fortress of Nundydroog, was held by the forces of Tipu Sultan, the ruler of Mysore. The British eventually stormed the fortress on 19 October.
