= Lists of Victoria Cross recipients =

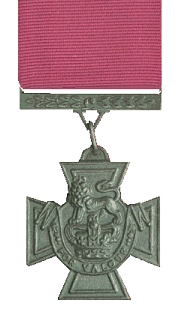
Victoria Cross

The Victoria Cross is the highest and most prestigious of the orders, decorations, and medals of the United Kingdom. It is awarded for valour "in the presence of the enemy" to members of the British Armed Forces. It was previously awarded to Commonwealth countries, most of which no longer recommend British honours. The lists are organized alphabetically, by military branch or service, by conflict, by nationality and by other criteria.

== Alphabetical ==
- List of Victoria Cross recipients (A–F)
- List of Victoria Cross recipients (G–M)
- List of Victoria Cross recipients (N–Z)

== By branch or service ==
- List of artillery recipients of the Victoria Cross
- List of Brigade of Guards recipients of the Victoria Cross
- List of Brigade of Gurkhas recipients of the Victoria Cross
- List of cavalry recipients of the Victoria Cross
- List of Royal Engineers recipients of the Victoria Cross
- List of medical recipients of the Victoria Cross
- List of Victoria Cross recipients of the Indian Army
- List of Victoria Cross recipients of the Royal Air Force
- List of Victoria Cross recipients of the Royal Navy

== By conflict ==
- List of Victoria Cross recipients by campaign
- List of Crimean War Victoria Cross recipients
- List of Indian Mutiny Victoria Cross recipients
- List of New Zealand Wars Victoria Cross recipients
- List of Zulu War Victoria Cross recipients
- List of Second Anglo-Afghan War Victoria Cross recipients
- List of Second Boer War Victoria Cross recipients
- List of First World War Victoria Cross recipients
- List of Second World War Victoria Cross recipients

== By nationality ==
- List of Victoria Cross recipients by nationality
- List of Australian Victoria Cross recipients
- List of Canadian Victoria Cross recipients
- List of English Victoria Cross recipients
- List of Irish Victoria Cross recipients
- List of New Zealand Victoria Cross recipients
- List of Scottish Victoria Cross recipients
- List of South African Victoria Cross recipients
- List of Victoria Cross recipients of uncertain nationality

== Other ==
- Victoria Cross forfeitures
