= List of medical recipients of the Victoria Cross =

The Victoria Cross

The Victoria Cross (VC) is a military decoration that may be bestowed upon members of the British or Commonwealth armed forces for acts of valour or gallantry performed in the face of the enemy. Within the British honours system and those of many Commonwealth nations it is the highest award a soldier can receive for actions in combat. It was established in 1856 and since then has been awarded 1,356 times, including three service personnel who were awarded the VC twice.

The VC was introduced on 29 January 1856 by Queen Victoria to reward acts of valour during the Crimean War. The traditional explanation of the source of the gunmetal from which the medals are struck is that it derives from Russian cannon captured at the siege of Sevastopol. Recent research has thrown doubt on this story, suggesting a variety of origins. The original Royal Warrant did not contain a specific clause regarding posthumous awards, although official policy was to not award the VC posthumously. Between 1897 and 1901, several notices were issued in the London Gazette regarding soldiers who would have been awarded the VC had they survived. In a partial reversal of policy in 1902, six of the soldiers mentioned were granted the VC, but not "officially" awarded the medal. In 1907, the posthumous policy was completely reversed and medals were sent to the next of kin of the six officers and men. The Victoria Cross warrant was not officially amended to explicitly allow posthumous awards until 1920 but one quarter of all awards for the First World War were posthumous.

Due to its rarity, the VC is highly prized and the medal has fetched over £400,000 at auction. A number of public and private collections are devoted to the Victoria Cross. The private collection of Lord Ashcroft, amassed since 1986, contains over one-tenth of all VCs awarded. Following a 2008 donation to the Imperial War Museum, the Ashcroft collection went on public display alongside the museum's Victoria and George Cross collection in November 2010. Since 1990, three Commonwealth countries that retain the Queen as head of state have instituted their own versions of the VC. As a result, the original Victoria Cross is sometimes referred to as the "Commonwealth Victoria Cross" or the "Imperial Victoria Cross", to distinguish it from the newer awards.

There have been medical officers in the English Army since a regular standing army was formed, following the restoration of Charles II in 1660, a practice that continues to the present day. Each regiment had a medical officer and assistants working in their regimental hospital. By the 1700s the Commander-in-Chief of the Forces the Duke of Marlborough John Churchill had introduced the forerunners of the field ambulance, to accompany the British Army of its campaigns. However it was not until the Napoleonic Wars, when the British were fighting in Spain that any kind of organised medical service was formed. The next major conflict fought by the British Army was the Crimean War, where the first three of forty Victoria Crosses were awarded to medical personnel. The forty-one awards include two of only three men, Noel Chavasse and Arthur Martin-Leake, to receive a second award and the youngest recipient Andrew Fitzgibbon aged fifteen years and 100 days. The medical recipients not only include physicians and surgeons but also other medical personnel like Henry Harden, killed when collecting wounded off the battlefield, or the afore mentioned Fitzgibbon who was a Hospital Apprentice. Among the thirty-eight medical recipients of the Victoria Cross, are representatives from the British, Canadian, Australian and the former British Indian Army.

== Medical recipients ==
| Name | Regiment/Corps | Date | Conflict | Location |
|---|---|---|---|---|
| Harold Ackroyd | Royal Berkshire Regiment | 31 July–1 August 1917 | First World War | Passchendaele |
| William Allen | Royal Artillery | 3 September 1916 | First World War | Near Mesnil |
| Henry Andrews | Indian Medical Services | 22 October 1919 | Waziristan campaign | Khajuri Post |
| William Babtie | Royal Army Medical Corps | 10 December 1899 | Second Boer War | Colenso |
| William Bradshaw | 90th Foot | 26 September 1857 | Indian Mutiny | Lucknow |
| Noel Chavasse | King's Regiment (Liverpool) | 9 August 1916; 31 July–2 August 1917 | First World War; First World War | Guillemont; Wieltje |
| Thomas Crean | 1st Imperial Light Horse | 18 December 1901 | Second Boer War | Tygerkloof |
| John Crimmin | Bombay Medical Services | 1 January 1889 | Karen-Ni Expedition | Near Lwekaw |
| Campbell Douglas | 24th Foot | 7 May 1867 | Andaman Expedition | Little Andaman |
| Henry Douglas | Royal Army Medical Corps | 11 December 1899 | Second Boer War | Magersfontein |
| Joseph Farmer | Army Hospital Corps | 27 February 1881 | First Anglo-Boer War | Majuba |
| John Fox-Russell | Royal Welch Fusiliers | 6 November 1917 | First World War | Khuweilfe |
| Andrew Fitzgibbon | Indian Medical Establishment | 21 August 1860 | Third China War | Taku Forts |
| John Green | Sherwood Foresters | 1 July 1916 | First World War | Loos |
| Thomas Hale | 7th Foot | 7–8 September 1855 | Crimean War | Sevastopol |
| Henry Harden | No. 45 (Royal Marine) Commando | 23 January 1945 | Second World War | Brachterbeek |
| Anthony Home | 90th Foot | 26 September 1857 | Indian Mutiny | Lucknow |
| Neville Howse | New South Wales Army Medical Corps | 24 July 1900 | Second Boer War | Vredefort |
| Bellenden Hutcheson | 75th (Mississauga) Battalion, CEF | 2 September 1918 | First World War | Drocourt-Quéant |
| Edgar Inkson | Royal Inniskilling Fusiliers | 24 February 1900 | Second Boer War | Hart's Hill |
| Joseph Jee | 78th Foot | 25 September 1857 | Indian Mutiny | Lucknow |
| Ferdinand Le Quesne | Army Medical Corps | 4 May 1889 | Burmese Occupation | Siallum |
| Owen Lloyd | Army Medical Corps | 6 January 1893 | Kachin Hills Expedition | Fort Sima |
| Valentine McMasters | 78th Foot | 25 September 1857 | Indian Mutiny | Lucknow |
| William Maillard | HMS Hazard | 6 September 1898 | 1898 Occupation of Crete | Candia |
| George Maling | Rifle Brigade | 25 September 1915 | First World War | Fauquissart |
| William Manley | Royal Artillery | 29 April 1864 | New Zealand Wars | Tauranga |
| Arthur Martin-Leake | South African Constabulary; Royal Army Medical Corps | 8 February 1902; 8 November 1914 | Second Boer War; First World War | Vlakfonteiu; Zonnebeke |
| Richard Masters | 141st Field Ambulance, R.A.S.C. | 9 April 1918 | First World War | Béthune |
| James Mouat | 6th Dragoons | 29 January 1856 | Crimean War | Balaclava |
| William Nickerson | Royal Army Medical Corps | 20 April 1900 | Second Boer War | Wakkerstroom |
| Harry Ranken | King's Royal Rifle Corps | 19–20 September 1914 | First World War | Hautevesnes |
| Herbert Reade | 61st Foot | 14–16 September 1857 | Indian Mutiny | Delhi |
| James Reynolds | Army Medical Department | 22–23 January 1879 | Zulu War | Rorke's Drift |
| Francis Scrimger | Canadian Army Medical Corps | 25 April 1915 | First World War | Battle of St Julien (24 April – 5 May) |
| John Sinton | Indian Medical Service | 21 January 1916 | First World War | Orah ruins |
| William Sylvester | 23rd Foot | 8 September 1855 | Crimean War | Sevastopol |
| William Temple | Royal Artillery | 29 April 1864 | New Zealand Wars | Tauranga |
| Harry Whitchurch | Indian Medical Service | 3 March 1895 | Chitral Expedition | Chitral Fort |
