= List of Victoria Cross recipients of uncertain nationality =

The following is a list of Victoria Cross recipients whose nationality is uncertain.

== B ==
- Valentine Bambrick – 1858; Bareilly, India
- Guy Hudleston Boisragon – 1891; Nilt Fort, India
- Samuel James Browne – 1858; Seerporah, India

== C ==
- George Channer – 1875; Perak, Malaya (now Malaysia)
- William St. Lucien Chase – 1880; Deh Khoja, Afghanistan
- Herbert Mackworth Clogstoun – 1859; Chichumbah, India
- Edmond William Costello – 1897; With the Malakand Field Force
- Charles Cowley – 1916; Kut-el-Amara, Mesopotamia

== D ==
- John Charles Campbell Daunt – 1857; Chota Behar, India
- Collingwood Dickson – 1854; Sebastopol, Crimea
- Matthew Charles Dixon – 1855; Sebastopol, Crimea

== E ==
- Howard Craufurd Elphinstone – 1855; Sebastopol, Crimea

== F ==
- Alfred Kirke Ffrench – 1857; Lucknow, India
- Henry Robert Bowreman Foote – 1942; Libya

== H ==
- Henry Marshman Havelock – 1857; Cawnpore, India
- Frederick William Hedges – 1918; Bousies, France
- Edward Elers Delaval Henderson – 1917; River Hai, Mesopotamia

== I ==
- Edgar Thomas Inkson – 1900; Colenso, South Africa
- Gilbert Stuart Martin Insall – 1915; Achiet, France

== J ==
- Hanson Chambers Taylor Jarrett – 1858; Baroun, India
- Henry Edward Jerome – 1858; Jhansi, India

== K ==
- Robert Kells – 1857; Bolandshahr, India

== L ==
- Ian Oswald Liddell – 1945; Lingen, Germany
- Frederick Lumsden – 1917; Francilly, France

== M ==
- Wilfred St. Aubyn Malleson – 1915; Gallipoli, Turkey
- Ross Lowis Mangles – 1857; Arrah, India
- Leslie Thomas Manser – 1942; Cologne, Germany
- Ian John McKay – 1982; Mount Longdon, Falkland Islands
- Valentine Munbee McMaster – 1857; Lucknow, India
- Eric Archibald McNair – 1916; Hooge, Belgium
- Charles John Melliss – 1900; Obassa, Ashanti (now Ghana)
- George Raymond Dallas Moor – 1915; Gallipoli, Turkey

== P ==
- Harry Prendergast – 1857; Mundisore, India
- Thomas Tannatt Pryce – 1918; Vieux Berquin, France

== R ==
- Henry James Raby – 1855; Sebastopol, Crimea
- John Neil Randle – 1944; Kohima, India
- George Alexander Renny – 1857; Delhi, India
- Frederick Roberts (The Hon.) – 1899; Battle of Colenso, South Africa
- Frederick Sleigh Roberts – 1858; Khodagunge, India
- George Murray Rolland – 1903; Daratoleh, Somaliland (now Somalia)

== S ==
- Euston Henry Sartorius – 1879; Shahjui, Afghanistan
- Reginald William Sartorius – 1874; Abogu, Ashanti (now Ghana)
- Hugh Shaw – 1865; Nukumaru, New Zealand
- John Manners Smith – 1891; Nilt Fort, India

== T ==
- Arthur Walderne St Clair Tisdall – 1915; Gallipoli, Turkey
- Henry Tombs – 1857; Delhi, India
- William Spottiswoode Trevor – 1865; Dewan-Giri, India
- John Adam Tytler – 1858; Choorpoorah, India

== W ==
- William George Walker – 1903; Daratoleh, Somaliland (now Somalia)
- William Francis Frederick Waller – 1858; Gwalior, India
- Reginald Alexander John Warneford – 1915; Ghent, Belgium
- Thomas Colclough Watson – 1897; Mamund Valley, India
- George Campbell Wheeler – 1917; Shumran, Mesopotamia
- George Godfrey Massy Wheeler – 1915; Shaiba, Mesopotamia
- Wallace Duffield Wright – 1903; Nigeria

== Y ==
- Frank Edward Young (VC) – 1918; Havrincourt, France

== See also ==
- Wikipedia:WikiProject Victoria Cross Reference Migration
