= Field marshal (United Kingdom) =

Highest military rank of the British Army

- Shoulder strap and rank insignia

- Distinguishing flag

- Motor car star plate
- Country: United Kingdom
- Service branch: British Army
- Abbreviation: FM
- Rank: Five-star rank
- NATO rank code: OF-10
- Formation: 1736
- Next lower rank: General
- Equivalent ranks: Admiral of the fleet (RN); Marshal of the Royal Air Force (RAF)

Field marshal (FM) has been the highest rank in the British Army since 1736. A five-star rank with NATO code OF-10, it is equivalent to an Admiral of the Fleet in the Royal Navy or a Marshal of the Royal Air Force in the Royal Air Force (RAF). A Field Marshal's insignia consists of two crossed batons surrounded by yellow leaves below the Tudor Crown. Like Marshals of the Royal Air Force and Admirals of the Fleet, Field Marshals traditionally remain officers for life, though on half-pay when not in an appointment or retired. The rank has been used sporadically throughout its history, and was vacant during parts of the 18th and 19th centuries (when all former holders of the rank were deceased). After the Second World War, it became standard practice to appoint the Chief of the Imperial General Staff (later renamed Chief of the General Staff) to the rank on his last day in the post. Army officers occupying the post of Chief of the Defence Staff, the professional head of all the British Armed Forces, were usually promoted to the rank upon their appointment.

In total, 143 men have held the rank of field marshal. The majority led careers in the British Army or the colonial British Indian Army, rising through the ranks to eventually become a field marshal. Some members of the British royal family, most recently Prince Edward, Duke of Kent and Charles III, were promoted to the rank after shorter periods of service. Three British monarchs (George V, Edward VIII, and George VI) assumed the rank on their accessions to the throne, while Edward VII and Charles III were already field marshals, and two British consorts, Albert, Prince Consort and Prince Philip, Duke of Edinburgh, were appointed by their respective queens. Other ceremonial appointments were made as diplomatic gestures. Twelve foreign monarchs have held the honour, though three (Wilhelm II, German Emperor; Franz Joseph I, Emperor of Austria-Hungary; and Hirohito, Emperor of Japan) were stripped of it when their countries became enemies of Britain and its allies in the two world wars. Also awarded the rank were one Australian (Sir Thomas Blamey) and one Frenchman (Ferdinand Foch), honoured for their contributions in World War I and World War II respectively, and one South African statesman (Jan Smuts).

A report commissioned by the Ministry of Defence in 1995 made a number of recommendations for financial savings in the armed forces' budget, one of which was the abolition of all five-star ranks. Part of the rationale was that these ranks were disproportionate to the size of the forces commanded by these officers, and that none of the United Kingdom's close allies, such as the United States (which reserves the rank of general of the army for officers who have commanded large armies in major wars), used such ranks. The recommendation was not taken up in full, but the practice of promoting service chiefs to five-star ranks was stopped, and the ranks are now reserved for special circumstances. Sir Peter Inge was, in 1994, the last active officer to be promoted to the rank. Inge relinquished the post of Chief of the Defence Staff (CDS) in 1997, and his successor, Sir Charles Guthrie, was the first officer not to be promoted upon appointment as CDS, although he was promoted to the honorary rank of field marshal in June 2012.

More promotions to field marshal came in 2012, eighteen years after the moratorium on routine promotions to the rank, when Queen Elizabeth II promoted Prince Charles, her son and heir, to the five-star ranks in all three services, in recognition of support provided for her in her capacity as Head of the British Armed Forces. At the same time, Guthrie, who relinquished the post of CDS and retired from active service in 2001, was promoted to honorary field marshal. In June 2014, former Chief of the Defence Staff Lord Walker of Aldringham was also promoted to honorary field marshal. The most recent promotions to the rank came in June 2025, when former Chiefs of the Defence Staff Lord Richards of Herstmonceux and Lord Houghton of Richmond were also promoted to the rank.

Although the rank of field marshal is not used in the Royal Marines, the insignia is used on the uniform of the Captain General, the ceremonial head of the corps (equivalent to colonel-in-chief).

== Insignia of rank ==
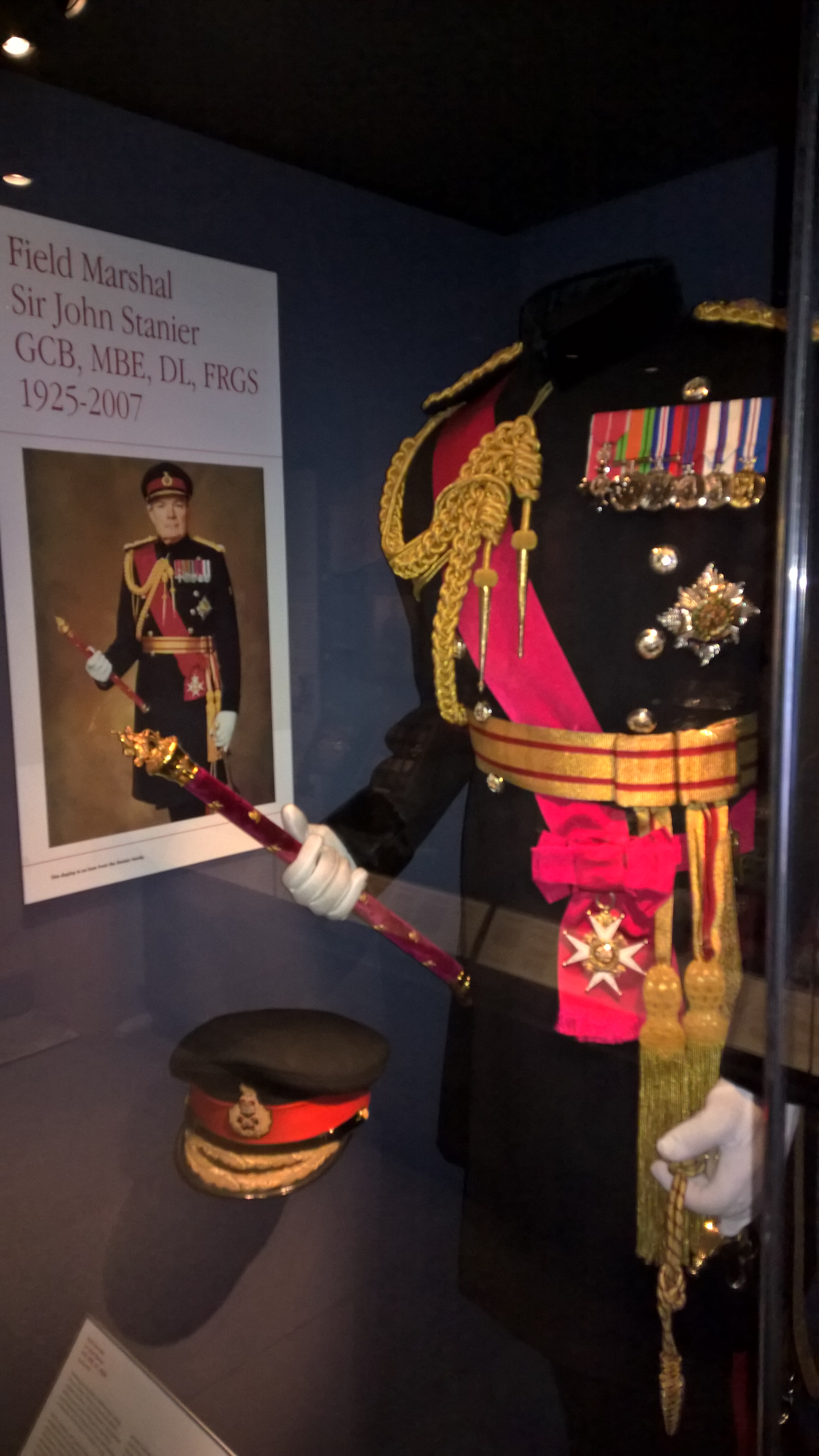
Field Marshal's uniform and baton (pertaining to the late Sir John Stanier) on display in the Royal Scots Dragoon Guards Museum, Edinburgh Castle.

The rank insignia of a field marshal in the British Army comprises two crossed batons in a wreath of laurel leaves, with a crown above. In some other countries, historically under the sphere of British influence, an adapted version of the insignia is used for field marshals, often with the crown being replaced with an alternative cultural or national emblem. On appointment, British field marshals are awarded a gold-tipped baton which they may carry on formal occasions.

== List of field marshals ==
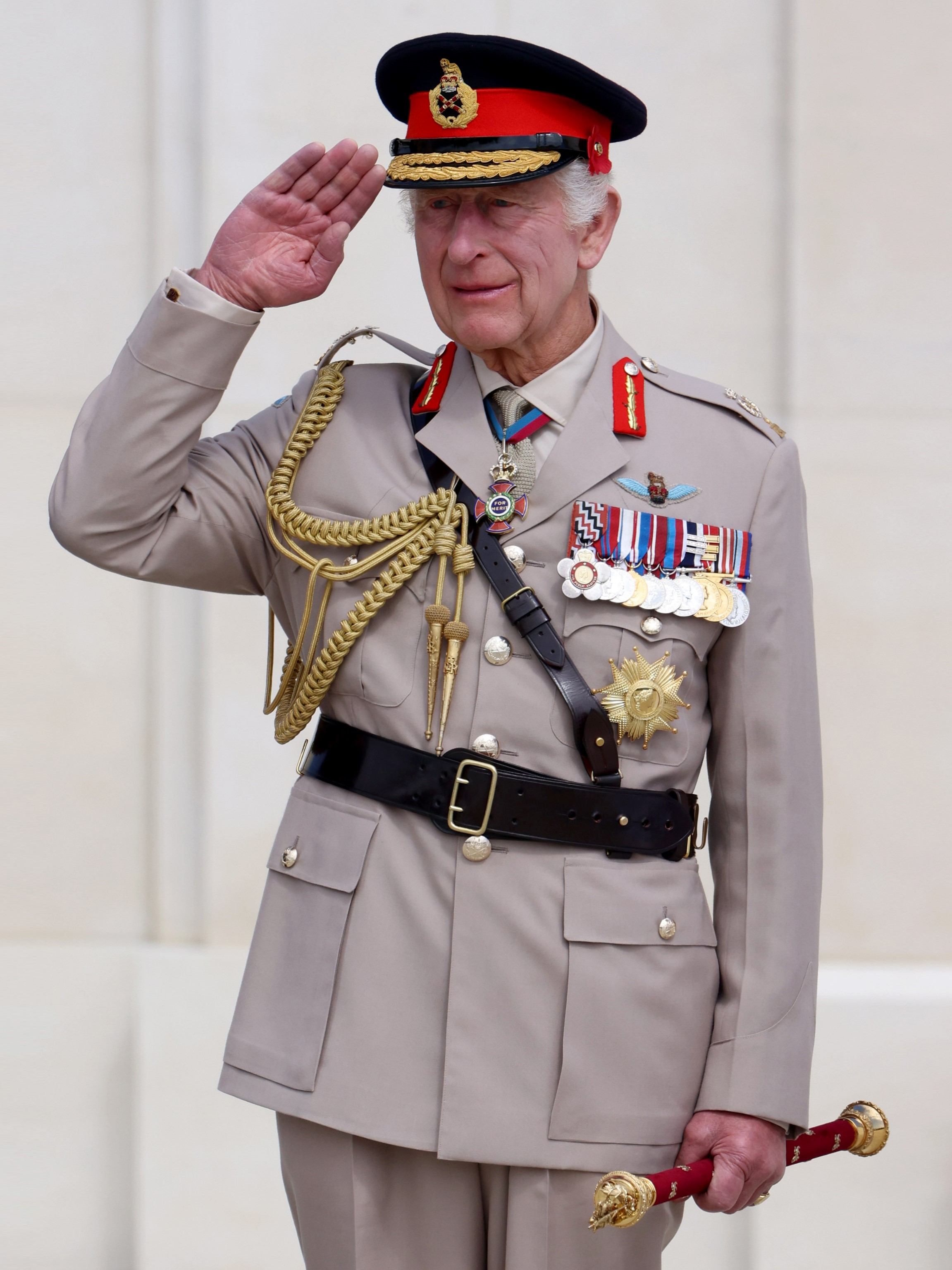
Charles III in the no. 4 warm weather service dress of a field marshal in the British Army

The buttons used on the uniform of a field marshal features two crossed batons ensigned by the Imperial Crown.

The vast majority of officers to hold the rank of field marshal were professional soldiers in the British Army, though eleven served as officers in the British Indian Army. At least fifty-seven field marshals were wounded in battle earlier in their careers, of whom 24 were wounded more than once, and eight had been prisoners of war. Fifteen future field marshals were present at the Battle of Vitoria, where the Duke of Wellington earned the rank, and ten others served under Wellington at the Battle of Waterloo. However, only thirty-eight held independent commands in the field, and just twelve served as Commander-in-Chief of the Forces (the pre-1904 professional head of the army) or Chief of the Imperial General Staff during a major war.

Four field marshals (Sir Evelyn Wood, Sir George White, Earl Roberts, and Lord Gort) had previously received the Victoria Cross (VC), the United Kingdom's highest and most prestigious award for gallantry 'in the face of the enemy'. Wood, a famously injury-prone officer, was awarded the VC for two actions in 1858, in which he first attacked a group of rebels in India, and later rescued an informant from another group of rebels. White, a cavalry officer, led two charges on enemy guns in Afghanistan in 1879, while Gort, of the Grenadier Guards, commanded a series of attacks while severely wounded during the First World War in 1918. Roberts received his VC for actions during the Indian Mutiny.

Wellington, 44 at the time of his promotion, was the youngest non-royal officer to earn the rank of field marshal. The 1st Marquess of Drogheda was the oldest, promoted at the age of 91, while a further twenty-three officers were promoted to field marshal in their eighties. Wellington was also the only field marshal to become Prime Minister of the United Kingdom.

No officer whose career was spent in the British Army has ever reached the rank of field marshal without having served in the cavalry, infantry, Royal Armoured Corps, Royal Artillery, or Royal Engineers. One non-British officer has been appointed field marshal in the British Army; Ferdinand Foch of France, in recognition of his contributions in the First World War, while one, Sir William Robertson, held every rank in the British Army, from private soldier to field marshal.

Field Marshals of the British Army
Name and style (Note: Titles and styles are those held by the field marshal when they died, or those currently held in the case of living field marshals; in most cases, these are not the same as the titles and styles held by an officer upon their promotion to the rank, nor (in the case of operational field marshals) those held when the officer retired from active service. All post-nominal letters, with the exception of 'VC' (denoting the Victoria Cross) are omitted.)	Regiment (Note: The regiment given is the regiment into which the field marshal was commissioned. This is not necessarily the regiment the officer first joined, nor is it necessarily the regiment in which the officer spent most of his career. An '—' indicates either that the officer did not lead a career in the British Army, or that the officer was not initially commissioned into a formal regiment.)	Image	Born	Promotion date	Died
George Hamilton, 1st Earl of Orkney	Royal Regiment of Foot	George Douglas-Hamilton	1666	12 January 1736	1737
John Campbell, 2nd Duke of Argyll	Earl of Argyll's Regiment of Foot	John Campbell	1680	14 January 1736	1743
Richard Boyle, 2nd Viscount Shannon	Horse Guards Regiment	Richard Boyle	1674	2 July 1739	1740
François de La Rochefoucauld, Marquis de Montandre			1672	2 July 1739	1739
John Dalrymple, 2nd Earl of Stair	26th (Cameronian) Regiment of Foot	John Dalrymple	1673	18 March 1742	1747
Richard Temple, 1st Viscount Cobham	6th Regiment of Foot	Richard Temple	1669	14 December 1742	1749
George Wade	Earl of Bath's Regiment	George Wade	1673	14 December 1742	1748
Sir Robert Rich, 4th Baronet	Grenadier Guards (1st Foot Guards)		1685	28 November 1757	1768
Richard Molesworth, 3rd Viscount Molesworth	Royal Scots	Richard Molesworth	1680	29 November 1757	1758
John Ligonier, 1st Earl Ligonier	10th Regiment of Foot	John Ligonier	1680	30 November 1757	1770
James O'Hara, 2nd Baron Tyrawley	39th (Dorsetshire) Regiment of Foot		1690	1 June 1763	1773
Henry Seymour Conway	5th Royal Irish Lancers	Henry Seymour Conway	1721	12 October 1793	1794
Prince William Henry, Duke of Gloucester and Edinburgh	13th Regiment of Foot	Prince William Henry	1743	12 October 1793	1805
Sir George Howard	24th Regiment of Foot	George Howard	1720	12 October 1793	1796
Prince Frederick, Duke of York and Albany	Grenadier Guards	Prince Frederick	1763	10 February 1795	1827
John Campbell, 5th Duke of Argyll	Royal Scots Fusiliers	John Campbell	1723	30 July 1796	1806
Jeffery Amherst, 1st Baron Amherst	Grenadier Guards	Jeffery Amherst	1717	30 July 1796	1797
John Griffin, 4th Baron Howard de Walden	Scots Guards	John Griffin	1719	30 July 1796	1797
Studholme Hodgson	Grenadier Guards	Studholme Hodgson	1708	30 July 1796	1798
George Townshend, 1st Marquess Townshend	7th Queen's Own Hussars	George Townshend	1724	30 July 1796	1807
Lord Frederick Cavendish	Coldstream Guards		1729	30 July 1796	1803
Charles Lennox, 3rd Duke of Richmond	Coldstream Guards	Charles Lennox	1735	30 July 1796	1806
Prince Edward, Duke of Kent and Strathearn	Royal Fusiliers	Prince Edward	1767	5 September 1805	1820
Arthur Wellesley, 1st Duke of Wellington	33rd Regiment of Foot	Arthur Wellesley	1769	21 June 1813	1852
Prince Ernest Augustus, Duke of Cumberland and Teviotdale	— (Royal Family; afterwards King of Hanover)	Ernest Augustus I	1771	6 November 1813	1851
Prince Adolphus, Duke of Cambridge	Hanoverian Guards	Prince Adolphus	1774	26 November 1813	1850
Prince William Frederick, Duke of Gloucester and Edinburgh	Scots Guards	Prince William Frederick	1776	24 May 1816	1834
Prince Leopold of Saxe-Coburg and Gotha	— (Royal Family; afterwards King of the Belgians)	Leopold I	1790	24 May 1816	1865
Charles Moore, 1st Marquess of Drogheda	12th Dragoons	Charles Moore	1730	19 July 1821	1821
William Harcourt, 3rd Earl Harcourt	Grenadier Guards	William Harcourt	1743	19 July 1821	1830
Sir Alured Clarke	50th (Queen's Own) Regiment of Foot	Alured Clarke	1745	22 July 1830	1832
Sir Samuel Hulse	Grenadier Guards	Samuel Hulse	1747 or 1748	22 July 1830	1837
Prince Albert of Saxe-Coburg and Gotha	— (Royal Family)	Prince Albert	1819	8 February 1840	1861
William II	— (King of the Netherlands)	William II	1792	28 July 1845	1849
Sir George Nugent, 1st Baronet	39th (Dorsetshire) Regiment of Foot	George Nugent	1757	9 November 1846	1849
Thomas Grosvenor	Grenadier Guards	Thomas Grosvenor	1764	9 November 1846	1851
Henry Paget, 1st Marquess of Anglesey	80th Regiment of Foot (Staffordshire Volunteers)	Henry Paget	1768	9 November 1846	1854
FitzRoy Somerset, 1st Baron Raglan	4th Light Dragoons	FitzRoy Somerse	1788	5 November 1854	1855
Stapleton Cotton, 1st Viscount Combermere	23rd Regiment of Foot	Stapleton Cotton	1773	2 October 1855	1865
John Byng, 1st Earl of Strafford	33rd Regiment of Foot	Stapleton Cotton	1772	2 October 1855	1860
Henry Hardinge, 1st Viscount Hardinge	Queen's Rangers	Henry Hardinge	1785	2 October 1855	1856
John Colborne, 1st Baron Seaton	East Devonshire Regiment	John Colborne	1779	1 April 1860	1863
Sir Edward Blakeney	99th Regiment of Foot	Edward Blakeney	1778	9 November 1862	1868
Hugh Gough, 1st Viscount Gough	Seaforth Highlanders	Hugh Gough	1779	9 November 1862	1869
Prince George, Duke of Cambridge	12th Royal Lancers	Prince George	1819	9 November 1862	1904
Colin Campbell, 1st Baron Clyde	9th (East Norfolk) Regiment of Foot	Colin Campbell	1792	9 November 1862	1863
Sir Alexander Woodford	9th (East Norfolk) Regiment of Foot	Alexander Woodford	1782	1 January 1868	1870
Sir William Gomm	9th (East Norfolk) Regiment of Foot	William Gomm	1784	1 January 1868	1875
Sir Hew Ross	Royal Artillery	Hew Ross	1779	1 January 1868	1868
Sir John Burgoyne	Royal Engineers	John Burgoyne	1782	1 January 1868	1871
Sir George Pollock, 1st Baronet	Bengal Artillery	George Pollock	1786	24 May 1870	1872
Sir John FitzGerald	— (retired)		1785	29 May 1875	1877
George Hay, 8th Marquess of Tweeddale	Grenadier Guards	George Hay	1787	29 May 1875	1876
King Edward VII	— (Royal Family)	Edward VII	1841	29 May 1875	1910
Sir William Rowan	52nd (Oxfordshire) Regiment of Foot	William Rowan	1789	2 June 1877	1879
Sir Charles Yorke	35th (Royal Sussex) Regiment of Foot	Charles Yorke	1790	2 June 1877	1880
Hugh Rose, 1st Baron Strathnairn	93rd (Sutherland Highlanders) Regiment of Foot	Hugh Rose	1801	2 June 1877	1885
Robert Napier, 1st Baron Napier of Magdala	Bengal Engineer Group	Robert Napier	1810	1 January 1883	1890
Sir Patrick Grant	11th Bengal Native Infantry	Patrick Grant	1804	24 June 1883	1895
Sir John Michel	64th (2nd Staffordshire) Regiment of Foot	John Michel	1804	27 March 1886	1886
Sir Richard Dacres	Royal Artillery	Richard Dacres	1799	27 March 1886	1886
Lord William Paulet	85th Regiment of Foot (Bucks Volunteers)	William Paulet	1804	10 July 1886	1893
George Bingham, 3rd Earl of Lucan	6th Regiment of Foot	George Bingham	1800	21 June 1887	1888
Sir Lintorn Simmons	Royal Engineers	Lintorn Simmons	1821	21 May 1890	1903
Sir Frederick Haines	4th Regiment of Foot	Frederick Haines	1818	21 May 1890	1909
Sir Donald Stewart, 1st Baronet	9th Bengal Native Infantry	Donald Stewart	1824	24 May 1894	1900
Garnet Wolseley, 1st Viscount Wolseley	12th Regiment of Foot	Garnet Wolseley	1833	24 May 1894	1913
Frederick Roberts, 1st Earl Roberts, VC	Bengal Artillery	Frederick Roberts	1832	25 May 1895	1914
Prince Edward of Saxe-Weimar	67th (South Hampshire) Regiment of Foot	Prince Edward	1823	22 June 1897	1902
Sir Neville Bowles Chamberlain	55th Bengal Native Infantry	Neville Chamberlain	1820	25 April 1900	1902
Wilhelm II, German Emperor	— (German Emperor; King of Prussia)	Wilhelm II	1859	27 January 1901	1941
Sir Henry Norman	1st Bengal Native Infantry	Henry Norman	1826	26 June 1902	1904
Prince Arthur, Duke of Connaught and Strathearn	Royal Engineers	Prince Arthur	1850	26 June 1902	1942
Sir Evelyn Wood, VC	13th Light Dragoons	Evelyn Wood	1838	8 April 1903	1919
Sir George White, VC	27th (Inniskilling) Regiment of Foot	George White	1835	8 April 1903	1912
Franz Joseph I of Austria	— (Emperor of Austria; King of Hungary)	Franz Joseph I	1830	1 September 1903	1916
Francis Grenfell, 1st Baron Grenfell	King's Royal Rifle Corps	Francis Grenfell	1841	11 April 1908	1925
Sir Charles Brownlow	51st Sikhs (Frontier Force)	Charles Brownlow	1831	20 June 1908	1916
Herbert Kitchener, 1st Earl Kitchener	Royal Engineers	Herbert Kitchener	1850	10 September 1909	1916
King George V	Royal Welsh Fusiliers; Ex officio — (Royal Family)	George V	1865	7 May 1910	1936
Paul Methuen, 3rd Baron Methuen	Scots Guards	Paul Methuen	1845	19 June 1911	1932
William Nicholson, 1st Baron Nicholson	Royal Engineers	William Nicholson	1845	19 June 1911	1918
John French, 1st Earl of Ypres	8th King's Royal Irish Hussars	John French	1852	3 June 1913	1925
Nicholas II of Russia	— (Emperor of Russia)	Nicholas II	1868	1 January 1916	1918
Douglas Haig, 1st Earl Haig	7th Queen's Own Hussars	Douglas Haig	1861	1 January 1917	1928
Sir Charles Egerton	31st (Huntingdonshire) Regiment of Foot	Sir Charles Egerton	1848	16 March 1917	1921
Emperor Taishō (Yoshihito)	— (Emperor of Japan)	Taishō	1879	1 January 1918	1926
Ferdinand Foch	35th Artillery Regiment – (French Army)	Ferdinand Foch	1851	19 July 1919	1929
Herbert Plumer, 1st Viscount Plumer	York and Lancaster Regiment	Herbert Plumer	1857	31 July 1919	1932
Edmund Allenby, 1st Viscount Allenby	6th (Inniskilling) Dragoons	Edmund Allenby	1861	31 July 1919	1936
Sir Henry Wilson, 1st Baronet	Rifle Brigade (Prince Consort's Own)	Henry Wilson	1864	31 July 1919	1922
Sir William Robertson, 1st Baronet	3rd Dragoon Guards	William Robertson	1860	29 March 1920	1933
Sir Arthur Barrett	5th Royal Gurkha Rifles (Frontier Force)	Arthur Barrett	1857	12 April 1921	1926
Albert I of Belgium	— (King of the Belgians)	Albert I	1875	4 May 1921	1934
William Birdwood, 1st Baron Birdwood	Royal Scots Fusiliers	William Birdwood	1865	20 March 1925	1951
Sir Claud Jacob	Worcestershire Regiment	Claud Jacob	1863	30 November 1926	1948
George Milne, 1st Baron Milne	Royal Artillery	George Milne	1866	30 January 1928	1948
Alfonso XIII of Spain	— (King of Spain)	Alfonso XIII	1886	3 June 1928	1941
Hirohito (Emperor Shōwa)	— (Emperor of Japan)	Hirohito	1901	26 June 1928	1989
Julian Byng, 1st Viscount Byng of Vimy	King's Royal Rifle Corps	Julian Byng	1861	17 July 1932	1935
Rudolph Lambart, 10th Earl of Cavan	Grenadier Guards	Rudolph Lambart	1865	31 October 1932	1946
Philip Chetwode, 1st Baron Chetwode	Oxfordshire and Buckinghamshire Light Infantry	Philip Chetwode	1869	13 February 1933	1950
Sir Archibald Montgomery-Massingberd	Royal Artillery	Archibald Montgomery-Massingberd	1871	7 June 1935	1947
King Edward VIII	Ex officio— (Royal Family)	Edward VIII	1894	21 January 1936	1972
Sir Cyril Deverell	West Yorkshire Regiment	Cyril Deverell	1874	15 May 1936	1947
King George VI	Ex officio— (Royal Family)	George VI	1895	12 December 1936	1952
Edmund Ironside, 1st Baron Ironside	Royal Artillery	Edmund Ironside	1880	20 July 1940	1959
Jan Smuts	— (South African Army)	Jan Smuts	1870	24 May 1941	1950
Sir John Dill	Prince of Wales's Leinster Regiment	John Dill	1881	18 November 1941	1944
John Vereker, 6th Viscount Gort, VC	Grenadier Guards	John Vereker	1886	1 January 1943	1946
Archibald Wavell, 1st Earl Wavell	Black Watch	Archibald Wavell	1883	1 January 1943	1950
Alan Brooke, 1st Viscount Alanbrooke	Royal Artillery	Alan Brooke	1883	1 January 1944	1963
Harold Alexander, 1st Earl Alexander of Tunis	Irish Guards	Harold Alexander	1891	4 June 1944	1969
Bernard Montgomery, 1st Viscount Montgomery of Alamein	Royal Warwickshire Regiment	Bernard Montgomery	1887	1 September 1944	1976
Henry Maitland Wilson, 1st Baron Wilson	Rifle Brigade (Prince Consort's Own)	Henry Maitland Wilson	1881	29 December 1944	1964
Sir Claude Auchinleck	62nd Punjabis (Indian Army)	Claude Auchinleck	1884	1 June 1946	1981
William 'Bill' Slim, 1st Viscount Slim	Royal Warwickshire Regiment	William Slim	1891	4 January 1948	1970
Sir Thomas Blamey	— (Australian Army)	Thomas Blamey	1884	8 June 1950	1951
Prince Philip, Duke of Edinburgh	Royal Navy – (Royal Family)	Prince Philip	1921	15 January 1953	2021
John Harding, 1st Baron Harding of Petherton	Somerset Light Infantry	John Harding	1896	21 July 1953	1989
Prince Henry, Duke of Gloucester	King's Royal Rifle Corps	Prince Henry	1900	31 March 1955	1974
Sir Gerald Templer	Royal Irish Fusiliers	Gerald Templer	1898	27 November 1956	1979
Sir Francis Festing	Rifle Brigade (The Prince Consort's Own)	Francis Festing	1902	1 September 1960	1976
Mahendra Bir Bikram Shah	— (King of Nepal)	Mahendra Bir Bikram Shah	1920	17 October 1962	1972
Haile Selassie	— (Emperor of Ethiopia)	Haile Selassie I	1892	20 January 1965	1975
Sir Richard Hull	17th/21st Lancers	Sir Richard Hull	1907	8 February 1965	1989
Sir James Cassels	Seaforth Highlanders		1907	29 February 1968	1996
Sir Geoffrey Baker	Royal Artillery	Sir Geoffrey Baker	1912	31 January 1971	1980
Michael Carver, Baron Carver	Royal Tank Corps		1915	18 July 1973	2001
Sir Roland Gibbs	King's Royal Rifle Corps		1921	13 July 1979	2004
Birendra Bir Bikram Shah	— (King of Nepal)	Birendra Bir Bikram Shah	1945	18 November 1980	2001
Edwin Bramall, Baron Bramall	King's Royal Rifle Corps	Edwin Bramall	1923	1 January 1982	2019
Sir John Stanier	7th Queen's Own Hussars		1925	10 July 1985	2007
Sir Nigel Bagnall	Green Howards		1927	9 September 1988	2002
Richard Vincent, Baron Vincent of Coleshill	Royal Artillery		1931	2 April 1991	2018
Sir John Chapple	2nd King Edward VII's Own Gurkha Rifles (The Sirmoor Rifles)		1931	14 February 1992	2022
Prince Edward, Duke of Kent	Royal Scots Greys – (Royal Family)	Prince Edward	1935	11 June 1993	living
Peter Inge, Baron Inge	Green Howards	Peter Inge	1935	15 March 1994	2022
King Charles III	Welsh Guards, Royal Navy, and Royal Air Force; Ex officio – (Royal Family)	Charles, Prince of Wales	1948	16 June 2012	living
Charles Guthrie, Baron Guthrie of Craigiebank	Welsh Guards	Charles Guthrie	1938	16 June 2012	2025
Michael Walker, Baron Walker of Aldringham	Royal Anglian Regiment	Michael Walker	1944	13 June 2014	living
David Richards, Baron Richards of Herstmonceux	Royal Artillery	David Richards	1952	14 June 2025	living
Nick Houghton, Baron Houghton of Richmond	Green Howards	Nicholas Houghton	1954	14 June 2025	living

== See also ==
- British Army other ranks rank insignia
  - Admiral of the Fleet (Royal Navy)
  - Marshal of the Royal Air Force
- British Army officer rank insignia
- Comparison of United Kingdom and United States military ranks
