= List of Victoria Cross recipients (N–Z) =

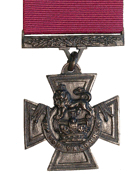
The Victoria Cross

The Victoria Cross (VC) is the highest award of the United Kingdom honours system. It is awarded for gallantry "in the face of the enemy" to members of the British armed forces. It may be awarded posthumously. It was previously awarded to Commonwealth countries, most of which have established their own honours systems and no longer recommend British honours. It may be awarded to a person of any military rank in any service and to civilians under military command although no civilian has received the award since 1879. Since the first awards were presented by Queen Victoria in 1857, two thirds of all awards have been personally presented by the British monarch. These investitures are usually held at Buckingham Palace.

The first citations of the VC, particularly those in the initial gazette of 24 February 1857, varied in the details of each action; some specify date ranges while some specify a single date. The original Royal Warrant did not contain a specific clause regarding posthumous awards, although official policy was not to award the VC posthumously. Between 1897 and 1901, several notices were issued in the London Gazette regarding soldiers who would have been awarded the VC had they survived. In a partial reversal of policy in 1902, six of the soldiers mentioned were granted the VC, but not "officially" awarded the medal. In 1907, the posthumous policy was completely reversed and medals were sent to the next of kin of the six soldiers. The Victoria Cross warrant was not officially amended to explicitly allow posthumous awards until 1920, but one quarter of all awards for the First World War were posthumous. Three people have been awarded the VC and Bar, which is a medal for two actions; Noel Chavasse, Arthur Martin-Leake and Charles Upham. Chavasse received both medals for actions in the First World War, while Martin-Leake was awarded his first VC for actions in the Second Boer War, and his second for actions during the First World War. Charles Upham received both VCs for actions during the Second World War.

The Victoria Cross has been awarded 1,358 times to 1,355 individual recipients. The largest number of recipients for one campaign is the First World War, for which 628 medals were awarded to 627 recipients. The largest number awarded for actions on a single day was 24 on 16 November 1857, at the Second Relief of Lucknow, during the Indian Mutiny. The largest number awarded for a single action was 18, for the assault on Sikandar Bagh, during the Second Relief of Lucknow. The largest number awarded to one unit during a single action was seven, to the 2nd/24th Foot, for the defence of Rorke's Drift (22–23 January 1879), during the Zulu War. Since 1991, Australia, Canada and New Zealand have created their own separate Victoria Crosses: the Victoria Cross for Australia, the Victoria Cross for Canada, and the Victoria Cross for New Zealand. Only three of these separate medals have been awarded, all for actions in the War in Afghanistan; Willie Apiata received the Victoria Cross for New Zealand on 26 July 2007; Mark Donaldson received the Victoria Cross for Australia on 16 January 2009; and Ben Roberts-Smith was awarded the Victoria Cross for Australia on 23 January 2011. As these are separate medals, they are not included in this list.

The youngest recipient of the VC was Andrew Fitzgibbon, who was fifteen at the time of the action that earned him the VC. By comparison, the oldest recipient was William Raynor at 61 at the time of his action in 1857. There have been several VCs awarded to close relatives. Four pairs of brothers and three fathers and sons have been awarded the VC. In his book Victoria Cross Heroes, Lord Ashcroft notes the story of the Gough family as possibly the "bravest family." Major Charles Gough was awarded the VC in 1857 for saving his brother, Lieutenant Hugh Gough, who in the same year went on to win a VC of his own, after he charged enemy guns. Charles' son, John Gough, then went on to win the family's third VC in 1903.

== Recipients (N–Z) ==
By default this list sorts alphabetically. Indian and Nepalese convention is for the family name first and the given name second; this is reflected in this list. The rank column sorts by the rank of the recipient at the time of the action. This column sorts by the comparative rank of the recipient within the British Armed Forces command structure. Within the British Armed Forces the Navy is the Senior Service, followed by the Army and then the Royal Air Force (RAF).

- This along with a * indicates that the Victoria Cross was awarded posthumously.

| Name | Rank | Unit | Campaign | Date of action |
|---|---|---|---|---|
| Namdeo Jadav | Sepoy | Maratha Light Infantry | Second World War | 9 April 1945 |
| Nand Singh | Acting Naik | Sikh Regiment | Second World War | 11–12 March 1944 |
| William Napier | Sergeant | 13th Regiment of Foot | Indian Mutiny | 6 April 1858 |
| William Nash | Corporal | Rifle Brigade | Indian Mutiny | 11 March 1858 |
| Martin Nasmith | Lieutenant Commander | HMS E11 | First World War | 20 May 1915 to 8 June 1915 |
| Philip Neame | Lieutenant | Corps of Royal Engineers | First World War | 19 December 1914 |
| Samuel Needham | Private | Bedfordshire Regiment | First World War | 10–11 September 1918 |
| Thomas Neely | Corporal | King's Own (Royal Lancaster Regiment) | First World War | 27 September 1918* |
| David Nelson | Sergeant | Royal Horse Artillery | First World War | 1 September 1914 |
| Randolph Nesbitt | Captain | Mashonaland Mounted Police | Mashona Rebellion | 19 June 1896 |
| Netrabahadur Thapa | Acting Subadar | 5th Gurkha Rifles | Second World War | 25–26 June 1944 |
| John Nettleton | Squadron Leader | No. 44 Squadron RAF | Second World War | 17 April 1942 |
| Robert Newell | Private | 9th Queen's Royal Lancers | Indian Mutiny | 19 March 1858 |
| James Newland | Captain | 12th Battalion, AIF | First World War | 7–14 April 1917^{[D]} |
| Augustus Newman | Lieutenant Colonel | Essex Regiment | Second World War | 28 March 1942 |
| William Newton | Flight Lieutenant | No. 22 Squadron RAAF | Second World War | 16–18 March 1943*^{[F]} |
| Moana-Nui-a-Kiwa Ngarimu | Second Lieutenant | 28th Māori Battalion, NZEF | Second World War | 26–27 March 1943* |
| Henry Nicholas | Private | Canterbury Regiment, NZEF | First World War | 3 December 1917 |
| Harry Nicholls | Lance Corporal | Grenadier Guards | Second World War | 21 May 1940 |
| William Nickerson | Lieutenant | Royal Army Medical Corps | Second Boer War | 20 April 1900 |
| Eric Nicolson | Flight Lieutenant | No. 249 Squadron RAF | Second World War | 16 August 1940 |
| Cecil Noble | Acting Corporal | Prince Consort's Own (Rifle Brigade) | First World War | 12 March 1915 |
| William Norman | Private | 7th Regiment of Foot | Crimean War | 19 December 1854 |
| Gerard Norton | Lieutenant | Kaffrarian Rifles | Second World War | 31 August 1944 |
| John Norwood | Second Lieutenant | 5th Dragoon Guards | Second Boer War | 30 October 1899 |
| Claude Nunney | Private | 38th Battalion, CEF | First World War | 1–2 September 1918 |
| George Nurse | Corporal | Royal Field Artillery | Second Boer War | 15 December 1899 |
| James Ockendon | Sergeant | Royal Dublin Fusiliers | First World War | 4 October 1917 |
| Luke O'Connor | Sergeant | Royal Welch Fusiliers | Crimean War | 20 September 1854 |
| William Odgers | Leading Seaman | HMS Niger | New Zealand Wars | 28 March 1860 |
| Timothy O'Hea | Private | Rifle Brigade | —^{[A]} | 9 June 1866 |
| Christopher O'Kelly | Acting Captain | 52nd Battalion, CEF | First World War | 26 October 1917 |
| Michael O'Leary | Lance Corporal | Irish Guards | First World War | 1 February 1915 |
| William Olpherts | Captain | Bengal Artillery | Indian Mutiny | 25 September 1857 |
| Martin O'Meara | Private | 16th Battalion, AIF | First World War | 9–12 August 1916 |
| John O'Neill | Sergeant | Prince of Wales's Leinster Regiment | First World War | 14 October 1918 |
| George Onions | Lance Corporal | Devonshire Regiment | First World War | 22 August 1918 |
| John Ormsby | Sergeant | King's Own (Yorkshire Light Infantry) | First World War | 14 April 1917 |
| Michael O'Rourke | Private | 7th Battalion, CEF | First World War | 15–17 August 1917 |
| John Osborn | Company Sergeant Major | Winnipeg Grenadiers | Second World War | 19 December 1941* |
| James Osborne | Private | Northamptonshire Regiment | First Boer War | 22 February 1881 |
| Gerald O'Sullivan | Captain | Royal Inniskilling Fusiliers | First World War | 1–2 July 1915 |
| Edmund O'Toole | Sergeant | Cape Frontier Light Horse | Anglo-Zulu War | 3 July 1879 |
| James Owens | Corporal | 49th Regiment of Foot | Crimean War | 30 October 1854 |
| William Oxenham | Corporal | 32nd Regiment of Foot | Indian Mutiny | 30 June 1857 |
| Anthony Palmer | Private | Grenadier Guards | Crimean War | 5 November 1854 |
| Frederick Palmer | Lance-Sergeant | Royal Fusiliers | First World War | 16–17 February 1917 |
| Robert Palmer | Squadron Leader | No. 109 Squadron RAF | Second World War | 23 December 1944* |
| James Park | Gunner | Bengal Artillery | Indian Mutiny | 14 November 1857 to 22 November 1857^{[D]} |
| John Park | Sergeant | 77th Regiment of Foot | Crimean War | 19 April 1855 |
| Parkash Singh | Havildar | 8th Punjab Regiment | Second World War | 6 January 1943 |
| Charles Parker | Sergeant | Royal Horse Artillery | Second Boer War | 31 March 1900 |
| Walter Parker | Lance Corporal | Royal Marine Light Infantry | First World War | 30 April 1915 to 1 May 1915 |
| Samuel Parkes | Private | 4th Light Dragoons | Crimean War | 25 October 1854 |
| Frederick Parslow | Mercantile Marine Master^{[E]} | Royal Naval Reserve | First World War | 4 July 1915* |
| Francis Parsons | Lieutenant | Essex Regiment | Second Boer War | 18 February 1900 |
| Hardy Parsons | Acting Second Lieutenant | Gloucestershire Regiment | First World War | 20–21 August 1917 |
| Frank Partridge | Private | 8th Battalion, AIF | Second World War | 24 July 1945 |
| George Paton | Acting Captain | Grenadier Guards | First World War | 1 December 1917* |
| John Paton | Sergeant | 93rd Regiment of Foot | Indian Mutiny | 16 November 1857 |
| John Pattison | Private | 50th Battalion, CEF | First World War | 10 April 1917 |
| Keith Payne | Warrant Officer Class II | Australian Army Training Team Vietnam | Vietnam War | 24 May 1969 |
| George Peachment | Private | King's Royal Rifle Corps | First World War | 25 September 1915* |
| George Pearkes | Acting Major | 5th Battalion Canadian Mounted Rifles | First World War | 30–31 October 1917 |
| Samuel Pearse | Sergeant | Royal Fusiliers | North Russia Relief Force | 29 August 1919* |
| James Pearson | Private | 86th Regiment of Foot | Indian Mutiny | 3 April 1858 |
| John Pearson | Private | 8th King's Royal Irish Hussars | Indian Mutiny | 17 June 1858 |
| Cyrus Peck | Lieutenant Colonel | 16th Battalion, CEF | First World War | 2 September 1918 |
| William Peel | Captain | Naval Brigade | Crimean War | 18 October 1854^{[D]} 5 November 1854; 18 June 1855 |
| Walter Peeler | Lance Corporal | 3rd Battalion, AIF | First World War | 4 October 1917 |
| Henry Pennell | Lieutenant | Sherwood Foresters | Tirah Campaign | 20 October 1897 |
| Henry Percy | Colonel | Grenadier Guards | Crimean War | 5 November 1854 |
| John Perie | Sapper | Corps of Royal Engineers | Crimean War | 18 June 1855 |
| Frederick Peters | Acting Captain | HMS Walney | Second World War | 8 November 1942 |
| Everard Phillipps | Ensign | 11th Bengal Native Infantry | Indian Mutiny | 30 May 1857 to 18 September 1857^{[D]} |
| Robert Phillips | Temp. Lieutenant | Royal Warwickshire Regiment | First World War | 25 January 1917 |
| Edmund Phipps-Hornby | Major | Royal Horse Artillery | Second Boer War | 31 March 1900 |
| Arthur Pickard | Ensign | Royal Artillery | New Zealand Wars | 20 November 1863 |
| Ernest Pitcher | Petty Officer | HMS Dunraven | First World War | 8 August 1917 |
| Henry Pitcher | Lieutenant | 4th Punjab Infantry | Umbeyla Campaign | 30 October 1863 |
| James Pitts | Private | Manchester Regiment | Second Boer War | 6 January 1900 |
| Basil Place | Lieutenant | HMS X7 | Second World War | 22 September 1943 |
| Alfred Pollard | Second Lieutenant | Honourable Artillery Company | First World War | 29 April 1917 |
| James Pollock | Corporal | Queen's Own Cameron Highlanders | First World War | 27 September 1915 |
| Charles Pope | Lieutenant | 11th Battalion, AIF | First World War | 15 April 1917* |
| Patrick Porteous | Temp. Captain | Royal Regiment of Artillery | Second World War | 19 August 1942 |
| Frederick Potts | Private | Berkshire Yeomanry | First World War | 21 August 1915 |
| Arthur Poulter | Private | Duke of Wellington's (West Riding Regiment) | First World War | 10 April 1918 |
| Prakash Singh Chib | Jemadar | 13th Frontier Force Rifles | Second World War | 16–17 February 1945* |
| Premindra Bhagat | Second Lieutenant | Corps of Indian Engineers | Second World War | 31 January 1941 to 1 February 1941 |
| Harry Prendergast | Lieutenant | Madras Engineers | Indian Mutiny | 21 November 1857 |
| John Prettyjohns | Corporal | Royal Marine Light Infantry | Crimean War | 5 November 1854 |
| Llewelyn Price-Davies | Lieutenant | King's Royal Rifle Corps | Second Boer War | 17 September 1901 |
| Thomas Pride | Captain of the Afterguard | Royal Navy | Bombardment of Shimonoseki | 6 September 1864 |
| Dighton Probyn | Captain | 2nd Punjab Cavalry | Indian Mutiny | 1857 to 1858^{[E]} |
| Arthur Procter | Private | King's (Liverpool Regiment) | First World War | 4 June 1916 |
| Joseph Prosser | Private | 1st Regiment of Foot | Crimean War | 16 June 1855 |
| George Prowse | Chief Petty Officer | Royal Naval Division | First World War | 2 September 1918 |
| Thomas Pryce | Acting Captain | Grenadier Guards | First World War | 11–12 April 1918* |
| John Purcell | Private | 9th Queen's Royal Lancers | Indian Mutiny | 19 June 1857 |
| Charles Pye | Sergeant Major | 53rd Regiment of Foot | Indian Mutiny | 17 November 1857 |
| Lionel Queripel | Captain | 10th Parachute Battalion | Second World War | 19 September 1944* |
| Robert Quigg | Private | Royal Irish Rifles | First World War | 1 July 1916 |
| Henry Raby | Lieutenant | Naval Brigade | Crimean War | 18 June 1855 |
| Ram Singh | Acting Subadar | 1st Punjab Regiment | Second World War | 25 October 1944* |
| Henry Ramage | Sergeant | 2nd Dragoons | Crimean War | 25 October 1854 |
| Rambahadur Limbu | Lance Corporal | 10th Gurkha Rifles | Malaysia-Indonesia Confrontation | 21 November 1965 |
| Horace Ramsden | Trooper | Protectorate Regiment | Second Boer War | 26 December 1899 |
| John Randle | Temp. Captain | Royal Norfolk Regiment | Second World War | 4–6 May 1944* |
| Harry Ranken | Captain | Royal Army Medical Corps | First World War | 19–20 September 1914* |
| William Ratcliffe | Private | Prince of Wales's Volunteers (South Lancashire Regiment) | First World War | 14 June 1917 |
| Reginald Rattey | Corporal | 25th Battalion, AIF | Second World War | 22 March 1945 |
| George Ravenhill | Private | Royal Scots Fusiliers | Second Boer War | 15 December 1899 |
| Walter Rayfield | Private | 7th Battalion, CEF | First World War | 2–4 September 1918 |
| Claud Raymond | Lieutenant | Corps of Royal Engineers | Second World War | 21 March 1945*^{[C]} |
| John Raynes | Acting Sergeant | Royal Field Artillery | First World War | 11 October 1915 |
| William Raynor | Lieutenant | Bengal Veterans Establishment | Indian Mutiny | 11 May 1857 |
| Anketell Read | Captain | Northamptonshire Regiment | First World War | 25 September 1915* |
| Herbert Reade | Surgeon | 61st Regiment of Foot | Indian Mutiny | 14 September 1857 |
| John Readitt | Private | Prince of Wales's Volunteers (South Lancashire Regiment) | First World War | 25 February 1917 |
| Hamilton Reed | Captain | Royal Field Artillery | Second Boer War | 15 December 1899 |
| Ivor Rees | Sergeant | South Wales Borderers | First World War | 31 July 1917 |
| Lionel Rees | Temp. Major | No. 32 Squadron RFC | First World War | 1 July 1916 |
| Thomas Reeves | Able Seaman | Naval Brigade | Crimean War | 5 November 1854 |
| Oswald Reid | Captain | King's (Liverpool Regiment) | First World War | 8–10 March 1917 |
| William Reid | Acting Flight Lieutenant | No. 61 Squadron RAF | Second World War | 3 November 1943 |
| Thomas Rendle | Bandsman | Duke of Cornwall's Light Infantry | First World War | 20 November 1914 |
| William Rennie | Lieutenant | 90th Regiment of Foot | Indian Mutiny | 21 September 1857, 25 September 1857^{[D]} |
| George Renny | Lieutenant | Bengal Horse Artillery | Indian Mutiny | 16 September 1857 |
| Douglas Reynolds | Captain | Royal Field Artillery | First World War | 26 August 1914; 9 September 1914^{[D]} |
| Henry Reynolds | Captain | Royal Scots (Lothian Regiment) | First World War | 20 September 1917 |
| James Reynolds | Surgeon Major | Army Medical Department | Anglo-Zulu War | 22–23 January 1879 |
| William Reynolds | Private | Scots Fusiliers Guards | Crimean War | 20 September 1854 |
| John Rhodes | Lance-Sergeant | Grenadier Guards | First World War | 9 October 1917 |
| William Rhodes-Moorhouse | Second Lieutenant | No. 2 Squadron RFC | First World War | 26 April 1915* |
| Alfred Richards | Sergeant | Lancashire Fusiliers | First World War | 25 April 1915 |
| Arthur Richardson | Sergeant | Lord Strathcona's Horse | Second Boer War | 5 July 1900 |
| George Richardson | Private | 34th Regiment of Foot | Indian Mutiny | 27 April 1859 |
| James Richardson | Piper | 16th Battalion, CEF | First World War | 8 October 1916* |
| Richhpal Ram | Subadar | 6th Rajputana Rifles | Second World War | 7 February 1941 |
| William Rickard | Quartermaster | HMS Weser | Crimean War | 11 October 1855 |
| Thomas Ricketts | Private | Royal Newfoundland Regiment | First World War | 14 October 1918 |
| Richard Ridgeway | Captain | Bengal Staff Corps | Second Naga Hills Expedition | 22 November 1879 |
| Frederick Riggs | Sergeant | York and Lancaster Regiment | First World War | 1 October 1918* |
| John Ripley | Corporal | Black Watch (Royal Highlanders) | First World War | 9 May 1915 |
| Henry Ritchie | Commander | HMS Goliath | First World War | 28 November 1914 |
| Walter Ritchie | Drummer | Seaforth Highlanders | First World War | 1 July 1916 |
| Jacob Rivers | Private | Sherwood Foresters | First World War | 12 March 1915* |
| John Robarts | Gunner | HMS Ardent | Crimean War | 29 May 1855 |
| Frank Roberts | Acting Lieutenant Colonel | Worcestershire Regiment | First World War | 22 March 1918 to 2 April 1918^{[D]} |
| Frederick Roberts | Lieutenant | King's Royal Rifle Corps | Second Boer War | 15 December 1899 |
| Frederick Roberts | Lieutenant | Bengal Horse Artillery | Indian Mutiny | 2 January 1858 |
| James Roberts | Private | 9th Queen's Royal Lancers | Indian Mutiny | 28 September 1857 |
| Peter Roberts | Lieutenant | HMS Thrasher | Second World War | 16 February 1942 |
| Charles Robertson | Lance Corporal | Royal Fusiliers | First World War | 8–9 March 1918 |
| Clement Robertson | Captain | Queen's (Royal West Surrey) Regiment | First World War | 4 October 1917 |
| James Robertson | Private | 27th Battalion, CEF | First World War | 6 November 1917* |
| William Robertson | Sergeant Major | Gordon Highlanders | Second Boer War | 21 October 1899 |
| Edward Robinson | Able Seaman | Naval Brigade | Indian Mutiny | 13 March 1858 |
| Eric Robinson | Lieutenant Commander | HMS Vengeance | First World War | 26 February 1915 |
| Leefe Robinson | Lieutenant | No. 39 Squadron RFC | First World War | 2–3 September 1916 |
| Henry Robson | Private | Royal Scots (Lothian Regiment) | First World War | 14 December 1914 |
| Patrick Roddy | Ensign | Bengal Army | Indian Mutiny | 27 September 1858 |
| George Rodgers | Private | 71st Regiment of Foot | Indian Mutiny | 16 June 1858 |
| James Rogers | Sergeant | South African Constabulary | Second Boer War | 15 June 1901 |
| Maurice Rogers | Sergeant | Wiltshire Regiment | Second World War | 3 June 1944 |
| Robert Rogers | Lieutenant | 44th Regiment of Foot | Third China War | 21 August 1860 |
| George Rolland | Captain | 1st Bombay Grenadiers | Third Somaliland Expedition | 22 April 1903 |
| Frederick Room | Acting Lance Corporal | Royal Irish Regiment | First World War | 16 August 1917 |
| Gerard Roope | Lieutenant Commander | HMS Glowworm | Second World War | 8 April 1940 |
| Matthew Rosamund | Sergeant Major | 37th Bengal Native Infantry | Indian Mutiny | 4 June 1857 |
| John Ross | Corporal | Corps of Royal Engineers | Crimean War | 21 July 1855 |
| George Roupell | Lieutenant | East Surrey Regiment | First World War | 20 April 1915 |
| Hugh Rowlands | Captain | 41st Regiment of Foot | Crimean War | 5 November 1854 |
| David Rushe | Troop Sergeant Major | 9th Queen's Royal Lancers | Indian Mutiny | 19 March 1858 |
| Charles Russell | Brevet Major | Grenadier Guards | Crimean War | 5 November 1854 |
| John Russell | Captain | Royal Army Medical Corps | First World War | 6 November 1917 |
| Charles Rutherford | Lieutenant | 5th Battalion Canadian Mounted Rifles | First World War | 26 August 1918 |
| William Ruthven | Sergeant | 22nd Battalion, AIF | First World War | 19 May 1918 |
| John Ryan | Private | 1st Madras European Fusiliers | Indian Mutiny | 26 September 1857 |
| John Ryan | Private | 65th Regiment of Foot | New Zealand Wars | 7 September 1863 |
| John Ryan | Lance Corporal | 55th Battalion, AIF | First World War | 30 September 1918 |
| Miles Ryan | Drummer | 1st Bengal European Regiment | Indian Mutiny | 14 September 1857 |
| Robert Ryder | Private | Duke of Cambridge's Own (Middlesex Regiment) | First World War | 26 September 1916 |
| Robert Ryder | Commander | HMS Campbeltown | Second World War | 28 March 1942 |
| Clifford Sadlier | Lieutenant | 51st Battalion, AIF | First World War | 24–25 April 1918 |
| Thomas Sage | Private | Somerset Light Infantry (Prince Albert's) | First World War | 4 October 1917 |
| Philip Salkeld | Lieutenant | Bengal Sappers and Miners | Indian Mutiny | 14 September 1857 |
| Nowell Salmon | Lieutenant | Naval Brigade | Indian Mutiny | 16 November 1857 |
| George Samson | Seaman | Royal Naval Reserve | First World War | 25 April 1915 |
| George Sanders | Corporal | Prince of Wales's Own (West Yorkshire Regiment) | First World War | 1 July 1916 |
| William Sanders | Lieutenant | HMS Prize | First World War | 30 April 1917 |
| Richard Sandford | Lieutenant | HMS C3 | First World War | 22–23 April 1918 |
| Willward Sandys-Clarke | Lieutenant | Loyal Regiment (North Lancashire) | Second World War | 23 April 1943* |
| Euston Sartorious | Captain | 59th Regiment of Foot | Second Afghan War | 24 October 1879 |
| Reginald Sartorius | Major | 6th Bengal Cavalry | First Ashanti Expedition | 17 January 1874 |
| Arthur Saunders | Sergeant | Suffolk Regiment | First World War | 26 September 1915 |
| William Savage | Able Seaman | HM Motor Gun Boat | Second World War | 28 March 1942* |
| John Sayer | Lance Corporal | Queen's (Royal West Surrey) Regiment | First World War | 21 March 1918^{[C]} |
| Arthur Scarf | Squadron Leader | No. 62 Squadron RAF | Second World War | 9 December 1941* |
| Christian Schiess | Corporal | Natal Native Contingent | Anglo-Zulu War | 22–23 January 1879 |
| Harry Schofield | Captain | Royal Field Artillery | Second Boer War | 15 December 1899 |
| John Schofield | Temp. Second Lieutenant | Lancashire Fusiliers | First World War | 9 April 1918* |
| Mark Scholefield | Seaman | Naval Brigade | Crimean War | 5 November 1854 |
| Andrew Scott | Captain | Bengal Staff Corps | Baluchistan | 26 July 1877 |
| Robert Scott | Private | Manchester Regiment | Second Boer War | 6 January 1900 |
| Robert Scott | Sergeant | Cape Mounted Riflemen | Basuto War | 8 April 1879 |
| Francis Scrimger | Captain | Royal Canadian Army Medical Corps | First World War | 25 April 1915 |
| Derek Seagrim | Temp. Lieutenant Colonel | Green Howards | Second World War | 20–21 March 1943 |
| Ernest Seaman | Lance Corporal | Royal Inniskilling Fusiliers | First World War | 29 September 1918* |
| William Seeley | Seaman | HMS Eurayalus | Bombardment of Shimonoseki | 6 September 1864 |
| George Sellar | Lance Corporal | 72nd Regiment of Foot | Second Afghan War | 14 December 1879 |
| Alfred Sephton | Petty Officer | HMS Coventry | Second World War | 18 May 1941*^{[C]} |
| Cecil Sewell | Lieutenant | Queen's Own (Royal West Kent Regiment) | First World War | 29 August 1918* |
| Shahamad Khan | Naik | 89th Punjab Regiment | First World War | 12–13 April 1916 |
| Robert Shankland | Lieutenant | 43rd Battalion, CEF | First World War | 26 October 1917 |
| Charles Sharpe | Acting Corporal | Lincolnshire Regiment | First World War | 9 May 1915 |
| John Shaul | Corporal | Highland Light Infantry | Second Boer War | 11 December 1899 |
| Hugh Shaw | Captain | 18th Regiment of Foot | New Zealand Wars | 24 January 1865 |
| Same Shaw | Private | Rifle Brigade | Indian Mutiny | 13 June 1858 |
| Robert Shebbeare | Lieutenant | 60th Bengal Native Infantry | Indian Mutiny | 14 September 1857 |
| Albert Shepherd | Private | King's Royal Rifle Corps | First World War | 20 November 1917 |
| John Sheppard | Boatswain's Mate | Naval Brigade | Crimean War | 15 July 1855 |
| Sher Thapa | Rifleman | 9th Gurkha Rifles | Second World War | 18–19 September 1944* |
| Sher Shah | Lance Naik | 16th Punjab Regiment | Second World War | 19–20 January 1945* |
| Robert Sherbrooke | Captain | HMS Onslow | Second World War | 31 December 1942 |
| John Sherwood-Kelly | Acting Lieutenant Colonel | Norfolk Regiment | First World War | 20 November 1917 |
| Robert Shields | Corporal | Royal Welch Fusiliers | Crimean War | 8 September 1855 |
| William Short | Private | Green Howards | First World War | 6 August 1916* |
| Alfred Shout | Captain | 1st Battalion, AIF | First World War | 9 August 1915* |
| William Sidney | Temp. Major | Grenadier Guards | Second World War | 8–9 February 1944 |
| Ellis Sifton | Lance-Sergeant | 18th Battalion, CEF | First World War | 9 April 1917* |
| John Simpson | Quartermaster Sergeant | 42nd Regiment of Foot | Indian Mutiny | 15 April 1858 |
| Ray Simpson | Warrant Officer Class II | Australian Army Training Team Vietnam | Vietnam War | 6–11 May 1969 |
| John Sims | Private | 34th Regiment of Foot | Crimean War | 18 June 1855 |
| John Sinnott | Corporal | 84th Regiment of Foot | Indian Mutiny | 6 October 1857 |
| John Sinton | Captain | Indian Medical Service | First World War | 21 January 1916 |
| John Skinner | Company Sergeant Major | King's Own Scottish Borderers | First World War | 18 August 1917 |
| Michael Sleavon | Corporal | Corps of Royal Engineers | Indian Mutiny | 3 April 1858 |
| Alfred Smith | Gunner | Royal Regiment of Artillery | Sudan Campaign | 17 January 1885 |
| Alfred Smith | Second Lieutenant | East Lancashire Regiment | First World War | 23 December 1915 |
| Archibald Smith | Temp. Lieutenant | Royal Naval Reserve | First World War | 10 March 1917* |
| Clement Smith | Lieutenant | Duke of Cornwall's Light Infantry | Fourth Somaliland Expedition | 10 January 1904 |
| Edward Smith | Lance-Sergeant | Lancashire Fusiliers | First World War | 21–23 August 1918 |
| Ernest Smith | Private | 1st Canadian Infantry Division | Second World War | 21–22 October 1944 |
| Philip Smith | Corporal | 17th Regiment of Foot | Crimean War | 18 June 1855 |
| Frederick Smith | Captain | 43rd Regiment of Foot | New Zealand Wars | 21 January 1864 |
| Henry Smith | Lance Corporal | 52nd Regiment of Foot | Indian Mutiny | 14 September 1857 |
| Issy Smith | Acting Corporal | Manchester Regiment | First World War | 26 April 1915 |
| James Smith | Corporal | Corps of Royal Engineers | Mohmand Campaign | 16 September 1897 |
| James Smith | Private | Border Regiment | First World War | 21 December 1914 |
| John Smith | Sergeant | Bengal Sappers and Miners | Indian Mutiny | 14 September 1857 |
| John Smith | Private | 1st Madras European Fusiliers | Indian Mutiny | 16 November 1857 |
| John Smith | Lieutenant | 5th Gurkha Rifles | Hunza-Naga Campaign | 20 December 1891 |
| John Smyth | Lieutenant | 15th Ludhiana Sikhs | First World War | 18 May 1915 |
| Nevill Smyth | Captain | 2nd Dragoon Guards | Sudan Campaign | 2 September 1898 |
| Quentin Smythe | Sergeant | Royal Natal Carabineers | Second World War | 5 June 1942 |
| James Somers | Sergeant | Royal Inniskilling Fusiliers | First World War | 1–2 July 1915 |
| Charles Spackman | Sergeant | Border Regiment | First World War | 20 November 1917 |
| Robert Spall | Sergeant | Princess Patricia's Canadian Light Infantry | First World War | 13 August 1918 |
| Bill Speakman | Private | Black Watch (Royal Highland Regiment) | Korean War | 4 November 1951 |
| David Spence | Troop Sergeant Major | 9th Queen's Royal Lancers | Indian Mutiny | 17 January 1858 |
| Edward Spence | Private | 42nd Regiment of Foot | Indian Mutiny | 15 April 1858 |
| Dudley Stagpoole | Drummer | 57th Regiment of Foot | New Zealand Wars | 2 October 1863 |
| William Stanlake | Private | Coldstream Guards | Crimean War | 26 October 1854 |
| Richard Stannard | Lieutenant | HMT Arab | Second World War | 28 April 1940 to 2 May 1940^{[D]} |
| Leslie Starcevich | Private | 2/43rd Battalion, AIF | Second World War | 28 June 1945 |
| Percy Statton | Sergeant | 40th Battalion, AIF | First World War | 10–12 August 1918 |
| Gordon Steele | Lieutenant | HM Coastal Motor Boat 88 | North Russia Relief Force | 18 August 1919 |
| Thomas Steele | Sergeant | Seaforth Highlanders | First World War | 22 February 1917 |
| George Stewart | Captain | 93rd Regiment of Foot | Indian Mutiny | 16 November 1857 |
| James Stokes | Private | King's Shropshire Light Infantry | Second World War | 1 March 1945* |
| Charles Stone | Gunner | Royal Field Artillery | First World War | 21 March 1918 |
| Walter Stone | Acting Captain | Royal Fusiliers | First World War | 30 November 1917* |
| Percy Storkey | Lieutenant | 19th Battalion, AIF | First World War | 7 April 1918 |
| Harcus Strachan | Lieutenant | The Fort Garry Horse | First World War | 20 November 1917 |
| George Stringer | Private | Manchester Regiment | First World War | 8 March 1916 |
| George Strong | Private | Coldstream Guards | Crimean War | September 1855 |
| Ronald Stuart | Lieutenant | HMS Pargust | First World War | 7 June 1917 |
| Frank Stubbs | Sergeant | Lancashire Fusiliers | First World War | 25 April 1915* |
| Sefanaia Sukanaivalu | Corporal | Fiji Infantry Regiment | Second World War | 23 June 1944* |
| Arthur Sullivan | Corporal | Royal Fusiliers | North Russia Relief Force | 10 August 1919 |
| John Sullivan | Boatswain's Mate | Naval Brigade | Crimean War | 10 April 1855 |
| William Sutton | Bugler | 60th Rifles | Indian Mutiny | 2 August 1857 to 13 September 1857^{[D]} |
| Edwin Swales | Acting Major | No. 582 Squadron RAF | Second World War | 23 February 1945* |
| Ernest Sykes | Private | Northumberland Fusiliers | First World War | 19 April 1917 |
| William Sylvester | Assistant surgeon | Royal Welch Fusiliers | Crimean War | 8 September 1855 |
| George Symons | Sergeant | Royal Regiment of Artillery | Crimean War | 6 June 1855 |
| William Symons | Second Lieutenant | 7th Battalion, AIF | First World War | 8–9 August 1915 |
| James Tait | Lieutenant | 78th Battalion, CEF | First World War | 11 August 1918* |
| Henry Tandey | Private | Duke of Wellington's (West Riding Regiment) | First World War | 28 September 1918 |
| John Taylor | Captain of the Forecastle | Naval Brigade | Crimean War | 18 June 1855 |
| Christopher Teesdale | Lieutenant | Royal Regiment of Artillery | Crimean War | 29 September 1855 |
| William Temple | Assistant surgeon | Royal Artillery | New Zealand Wars | 20 November 1863 |
| Edward Thackeray | Second Lieutenant | Bengal Sappers and Miners | Indian Mutiny | 16 September 1857 |
| Thaman Gurung | Rifleman | 5th Gurkha Rifles | Second World War | 10 November 1944* |
| Jacob Thomas | Bombardier | Bengal Artillery | Indian Mutiny | 27 September 1857 |
| John Thomas | Lance Corporal | Prince of Wales's (North Staffordshire Regiment) | First World War | 30 November 1917 |
| Alexander Thompson | Lance Corporal | 42nd Regiment of Foot | Indian Mutiny | 5 April 1858 |
| George Thompson | Flight Sergeant | No. 9 Squadron RAF | Second World War | 1 January 1945*^{[C]} |
| James Thompson | Private | 60th Rifles | Indian Mutiny | 9 July 1857 |
| Hugo Throssell | Second Lieutenant | 10th Light Horse Regiment | First World War | 29–30 August 1915 |
| Frederick Tilston | Acting Major | Essex Scottish Regiment | Second World War | 1 March 1945 |
| Arthur Tisdall | Sub-Lieutenant | Royal Naval Volunteer Reserve | First World War | 25 April 1915 |
| Ross Tollerton | Private | Queen's Own Cameron Highlanders | First World War | 14 September 1914 |
| Henry Tombs | Major | Bengal Horse Artillery | Indian Mutiny | 9 July 1857 |
| Joseph Tombs | Lance Corporal | King's (Liverpool Regiment) | First World War | 16 June 1915 |
| Frederick Topham | Corporal | 1st Canadian Parachute Battalion | Second World War | 24 March 1945 |
| James Towers | Private | Cameronians (Scottish Rifles) | First World War | 6 October 1918 |
| Edgar Towner | Lieutenant | 2nd Machine Gun Battalion, AIF | First World War | 1 September 1918 |
| Ernest Towse | Captain | Gordon Highlanders | Second Boer War | 11 December 1899 |
| Alfred Toye | Acting Captain | Duke of Cambridge's Own (Middlesex Regiment) | First World War | 25 March 1918 |
| Charles Train | Corporal | London Scottish Regiment | First World War | 8 December 1917 |
| James Travers | Colonel | 2nd Bengal Native Infantry | Indian Mutiny | July 1857 |
| Richard Travis | Sergeant | Otago Infantry Regiment | First World War | 24 July 1918* |
| William Traynor | Sergeant | West Yorkshire Regiment | Second Boer War | 6 February 1901 |
| Leonard Trent | Squadron Leader | No. 487 Squadron RNZAF | Second World War | 3 May 1943 |
| William Trevor | Major | Bengal Engineers | Bhutan War | 30 April 1865 |
| Joseph Trewavas | Seaman | HMS Beagle | Crimean War | 3 July 1855 |
| Lloyd Trigg | Flying Officer | No. 200 Squadron RAF | Second World War | 11 August 1943* |
| Paul Triquet | Captain | Royal 22^{e} Régiment | Second World War | 14 December 1943 |
| Frederick Tubb | Lieutenant | 7th Battalion, AIF | First World War | 9 August 1915 |
| Tul Pun | Rifleman | 6th Gurkha Rifles | Second World War | 23 June 1944 |
| James Turnbull | Sergeant | Highland Light Infantry | First World War | 1 July 1916* |
| Alexander Turner | Second Lieutenant | Princess Charlotte of Wales's (Royal Berkshire Regiment) | First World War | 28 September 1915*^{[C]} |
| Hanson Turner | Acting Sergeant | West Yorkshire Regiment (The Prince of Wales's Own) | Second World War | 6–7 June 1944* |
| Richard Turner | Lieutenant | Royal Canadian Dragoons | Second Boer War | 7 November 1900 |
| Samuel Turner | Private | 60th Rifles | Indian Mutiny | 19 June 1857 |
| Victor Turner | Temp. Lieutenant Colonel | Rifle Brigade (Prince Consort's Own) | Second World War | 27 October 1942 |
| Thomas Turrall | Private | Worcestershire Regiment | First World War | 3 July 1916 |
| John Tytler | Lieutenant | 66th Bengal Native Infantry | Indian Mutiny | 10 February 1858 |
| Umrao Singh | Havildar | 81st West African Division | Second World War | 15–16 December 1944 |
| Edward Unwin | Captain | HMS River Clyde | First World War | 22 April 1915 |
| Charles Upham | Second Lieutenant; Captain | 20th Battalion, NZEF | Second World War | 22–30 May 1941; 14–15 July 1942^{[B]} |
| James Upton | Corporal | Sherwood Foresters | First World War | 9 May 1915 |
| John Vallentin | Captain | South Staffordshire Regiment | First World War | 7 November 1914* |
| Bernard Vann | Acting Lieutenant Colonel | Sherwood Foresters | First World War | 29 September 1918 |
| Theodore Veale | Private | Devonshire Regiment | First World War | 20 July 1916 |
| John Vereker | Acting Lieutenant Colonel | Grenadier Guards | First World War | 27 September 1918 |
| Arthur Vickers | Private | Royal Warwickshire Regiment | First World War | 25 September 1915 |
| Charles Vickers | Temp. Captain | Sherwood Foresters | First World War | 14 October 1915 |
| Samuel Vickery | Private | Dorset Regiment | Tirah Campaign | 20 October 1897 |
| William Vousden | Captain | 5th Punjab Cavalry | Second Afghan War | 14 December 1879 |
| Richard Wadeson | Lieutenant | 75th Regiment of Foot | Indian Mutiny | 17 July 1857 |
| Richard Wain | Captain | Tank Corps | First World War | 20 November 1917* |
| Richard Wakeford | Temp. Captain | Hampshire Regiment | Second World War | 13 May 1944 |
| Adam Wakenshaw | Private | Durham Light Infantry | Second World War | 27 June 1942* |
| Garth Walford | Captain | Royal Artillery | First World War | 26 April 1915* |
| Mark Walker | Lieutenant | 30th Regiment of Foot | Crimean War | 5 November 1854 |
| William Walker | Captain | 4th Gurkha Rifles | Third Somaliland Expedition | 22 April 1903 |
| Samuel Wallace | Temp. Lieutenant | Royal Field Artillery | First World War | 20 November 1917 |
| George Waller | Lieutenant | 60th Rifles | Indian Mutiny | 14 September 1857, 18 September 1857^{[D]} |
| Horace Waller | Private | King's Own (Yorkshire Light Infantry) | First World War | 10 April 1917* |
| William Waller | Lieutenant | 25th Bombay Light Infantry | Indian Mutiny | 20 June 1858 |
| George Walters | Sergeant | 49th Regiment of Foot | Crimean War | 5 November 1854 |
| Malcolm Wanklyn | Lieutenant Commander | HMS Upholder | Second World War | 24 May 1941 |
| Bernard Warburton-Lee | Captain | HMS Hardy | Second World War | 10 April 1940* |
| Charles Ward | Private | King's Own Yorkshire Light Infantry | Second Boer War | 26 June 1900 |
| Henry Ward | Private | 78th Regiment of Foot | Indian Mutiny | 25 September 1857 |
| James Ward | Sergeant | No. 75 Squadron RAF | Second World War | 7 July 1941 |
| Joseph Ward | Sergeant | 8th King's Royal Irish Hussars | Indian Mutiny | 17 June 1858 |
| Sidney Ware | Corporal | Seaforth Highlanders | First World War | 6 April 1916 |
| William Waring | Lance-Sergeant | Royal Welsh Fusiliers | First World War | 18 September 1918* |
| Blair Wark | Major | 32nd Battalion, AIF | First World War | 29 September 1918 to 1 October 1918^{[D]} |
| Reginald Warneford | Flight Sub-Lieutenant | No. 1 Squadron RNAS | First World War | 7 June 1915 |
| Edward Warner | Private | Bedfordshire Regiment | First World War | 1 May 1915* |
| Samuel Wassall | Private | 80th Regiment of Foot | Anglo-Zulu War | 22 January 1879 |
| Arnold Waters | Acting Major | Corps of Royal Engineers | First World War | 4 November 1918 |
| Tasker Watkins | Lieutenant | Welch Regiment | Second World War | 16 August 1944 |
| John Watson | Lieutenant | 3rd Bombay European Regiment | Indian Mutiny | 14 November 1857 |
| Oliver Watson | Acting Lieutenant Colonel | King's Own (Yorkshire Light Infantry) | First World War | 28 March 1918* |
| Thomas Watson | Lieutenant | Corps of Royal Engineers | Mohmand Campaign | 16 September 1897 |
| Joseph Watt | Skipper | Royal Naval Reserve | First World War | 15 May 1917 |
| Henry Weale | Lance Corporal | Royal Welsh Fusiliers | First World War | 26 August 1918 |
| Frank Wearne | Second Lieutenant | Essex Regiment | First World War | 28 June 1917* |
| Lawrence Weathers | Temp. Corporal | 43rd Battalion, AIF | First World War | 2 September 1918 |
| James Welch | Lance Corporal | Princess Charlotte of Wales's (Royal Berkshire Regiment) | First World War | 29 April 1917 |
| Harry Wells | Second Lieutenant | Royal Sussex Regiment | First World War | 25 September 1915* |
| Ferdinand West | Captain | No. 8 Squadron RFC | First World War | 12 August 1918 |
| Richard West | Acting Lieutenant Colonel | North Irish Horse | First World War | 2 September 1918* |
| William Weston | Lieutenant | Green Howards | Second World War | 3 March 1945 |
| Francis Wheatley | Private | Rifle Brigade (Prince Consort's Own) | Crimean War | 12 October 1854 |
| Kevin Wheatley | Warrant Officer Class II | Australian Army Training Team Vietnam | Vietnam War | 13 November 1965* |
| George Wheeler | Major | 9th Gurkha Rifles | First World War | 23 February 1917 |
| George Wheeler | Major | 7th Hariana Lancers | First World War | 12–13 April 1915* |
| Frederick Whirlpool | Private | 1st Punjab Cavalry | Indian Mutiny | 3 April 1858, 2 May 1858^{[D]} |
| Harry Whitchurch | Surgeon Captain | Indian Medical Service | Chitral Expedition | 3 March 1895 |
| Albert White | Sergeant | South Wales Borderers | First World War | 19 May 1917* |
| Archie White | Temp. Captain | Green Howards | First World War | 21 September 1916 to 1 October 1916^{[D]} |
| Geoffrey White | Lieutenant Commander | HMS E14 | First World War | 28 January 1918* |
| George White | Major | 92nd Regiment of Foot | Second Afghan War | 6 October 1879 |
| Jack White | Private | King's Own (Royal Lancaster Regiment) | First World War | 7 March 1917 |
| William White | Temp. Second Lieutenant | Machine Gun Corps | First World War | 18 September 1918 |
| Harold Whitfield | Private | King's (Shropshire Light Infantry) | First World War | 10 March 1918 |
| Thomas Whitham | Private | Coldstream Guards | First World War | 31 July 1917 |
| John Whittle | Sergeant | 12th Battalion, AIF | First World War | 9–10 April 1917 |
| Alfred Wilcox | Lance Corporal | Oxfordshire and Buckinghamshire Light Infantry | First World War | 12 September 1918 |
| Alfred Wilkinson | Private | Manchester Regiment | First World War | 20 October 1918 |
| Thomas Wilkinson | Bombardier | Royal Marine Artillery | Crimean War | 7 June 1855 |
| Thomas Wilkinson | Temp. Lieutenant | Loyal North Lancashire Regiment | First World War | 5 July 1916 |
| Thomas Wilkinson | Temp. Lieutenant | HMS Li Wo | Second World War | 14 February 1942* |
| John Williams | Private | 24th Regiment of Foot | Anglo-Zulu War | 22–23 January 1879 |
| John Williams | Company Sergeant Major | South Wales Borderers | First World War | 7–8 October 1918 |
| William Williams | Seaman | Royal Naval Reserve | First World War | 7 June 1917 |
| William Williams | Able Seaman | HMS River Clyde | First World War | 25 April 1915* |
| Richard Willis | Captain | Lancashire Fusiliers | First World War | 25 April 1915 |
| Henry Wilmot | Captain | Rifle Brigade | Indian Mutiny | 11 March 1858 |
| Arthur Wilson | Captain | HMS Hecla | Sudan Campaign | 29 February 1884 |
| Eric Wilson | Acting Captain | East Surrey Regiment | Second World War | 11–15 August 1940 |
| George Wilson | Private | Highland Light Infantry | First World War | 14 September 1914 |
| Harry Wood | Corporal | Scots Guards | First World War | 13 October 1918 |
| Evelyn Wood | Lieutenant | 17th Lancers | Indian Mutiny | 19 October 1858 |
| John Wood | Captain | 20th Bombay Native Infantry | Anglo-Persian War | 9 December 1856 |
| Wilfred Wood | Private | Northumberland Fusiliers | First World War | 28 October 1918 |
| Joseph Woodall | Lance-Sergeant | Prince Consort's Own (Rifle Brigade) | First World War | 11 April 1918 |
| Thomas Woodcock | Private | Irish Guards | First World War | 12–13 September 1917 |
| Charles Wooden | Sergeant | 17th Lancers | Crimean War | 26 October 1854 |
| Sidney Woodroffe | Second Lieutenant | Prince Consort's Own (Rifle Brigade) | First World War | 30 July 1915* |
| James Woods | Private | 48th Battalion, AIF | First World War | 18 September 1918 |
| Geoffrey Woolley | Second Lieutenant | Queen Victoria's Rifles | First World War | 20–21 April 1915 |
| Alexander Wright | Private | 77th Regiment of Foot | Crimean War | 22 March 1855; 19 April 1855 |
| Peter Wright | Company Sergeant Major | Coldstream Guards | Second World War | 25 September 1943 |
| Theodore Wright | Captain | Corps of Royal Engineers | First World War | 23 August 1914; 14 September 1914*^{[D]} |
| Wallace Wright | Lieutenant | 2nd Regiment of Foot | Kano-Sokoto Expedition | 26 February 1903 |
| George Wyatt | Lance Corporal | Coldstream Guards | First World War | 25–26 August 1914 |
| Guy Wylly | Lieutenant | 1st Tasmanian Imperial Bushmen | Second Boer War | 1 September 1900 |
| Charles Yate | Major | King's Own (Yorkshire Light Infantry) | First World War | 26 August 1914 |
| Yeshwant Ghadge | Naik | Maratha Light Infantry | Second World War | 10 July 1944* |
| Frederick Youens | Second Lieutenant | Durham Light Infantry | First World War | 7 July 1917* |
| Jack Youll | Lieutenant | Northumberland Fusiliers | First World War | 15 June 1918 |
| Alexander Young | Sergeant Major | Cape Police | Second Boer War | 13 August 1901 |
| Frank Young | Second Lieutenant | Hertfordshire Regiment | First World War | 18 September 1918* |
| John Young | Private | 87th Battalion, CEF | First World War | 2 September 1918 |
| Thomas Young | Private | Durham Light Infantry | First World War | 25–31 March 1918 |
| Thomas Young | Lieutenant | Naval Brigade | Indian Mutiny | 16 November 1857 |
| William Young | Private | East Lancashire Regiment | First World War | 22 December 1915 |
| David Younger | Captain | Gordon Highlanders | Second Boer War | 11 July 1900 |
| Raphael Zengel | Sergeant | 5th Battalion (Western Cavalry), CEF | First World War | 9 August 1918 |

== Notes ==
- A Between 1858 and 1881, the Victoria Cross could be awarded for actions taken "under circumstances of extreme danger" not in the face of the enemy. O'Hea single-handedly put out a fire in an ammunition cart, and was awarded the VC for that action. This rule was changed in 1881 to allow only acts "in the presence of the enemy".
- B This was a Bar to the Victoria Cross.
- C Recipient died of their wounds.
- D Recipient awarded the Victoria Cross for multiple acts of valour or for an extended period of sustained courage and outstanding leadership, rather than a single act of valour.
- E Parslow and Smith were Masters in the Merchant Navy and as civilians, they were not eligible for the VC. They were both posthumously promoted to Lieutenant in the Royal Naval Reserve (RNR) to facilitate the awarding of the VC.
- F Newton was captured by Japanese forces and beheaded 11 days later.
