= Herbert Niel Randle =

Herbert Niel Randle C.I.E. F.B.A. (1880–1973), commonly known as H. N. Randle, was the librarian of the India Office Library (1933–49; assistant librarian 1927–33), professor of philosophy at Queen's College, Benares and a writer on Indian philosophy.

His son, John Niel Randle, was posthumously awarded a Victoria Cross for valour at the Battle of Kohima in 1944.
