= First Battle of Colenso =

1899 skirmish in Natal, South Africa

- Part of the Northern Natal Offensive of the Second Boer War
| Date | 3 November 1899 |
| Location | Colenso, Natal, South Africa |

Belligerents
| United Kingdom of Great Britain and Ireland | South African Republic |

Strength
| ~200 | unknown |

The First Battle of Colenso (3 November 1899), often called the Skirmish of Colenso, was a military engagement between the Durban Light Infantry and a Boer commando. At the time, the Boers had just surrounded the city of Ladysmith, placing them under siege.

== Description ==
With the Boers having laid Ladysmith under siege, and trapping most of the British force in Natal there, the remainder of the British forces began to move towards Estcourt. A small detachment of the Durban Light Infantry and a naval brigade from HMS Tartar had constructed primitive fortifications at Colenso, acting as an outpost for the British forces in the area. On 3 November, the Boers moved their artillery to the heights to the north of Colenso. They began to open fire on the British position, with the British taking no cover as they had no artillery to counter. They hastily evacuated their positions after some time, and left before Boer infantry could take the town. These forces then moved to Estcourt, leaving the Tugela River undefended, allowing the Boers to set up defensive positions there.
