= Robert Shields (VC) =

Recipient of the Victoria Cross

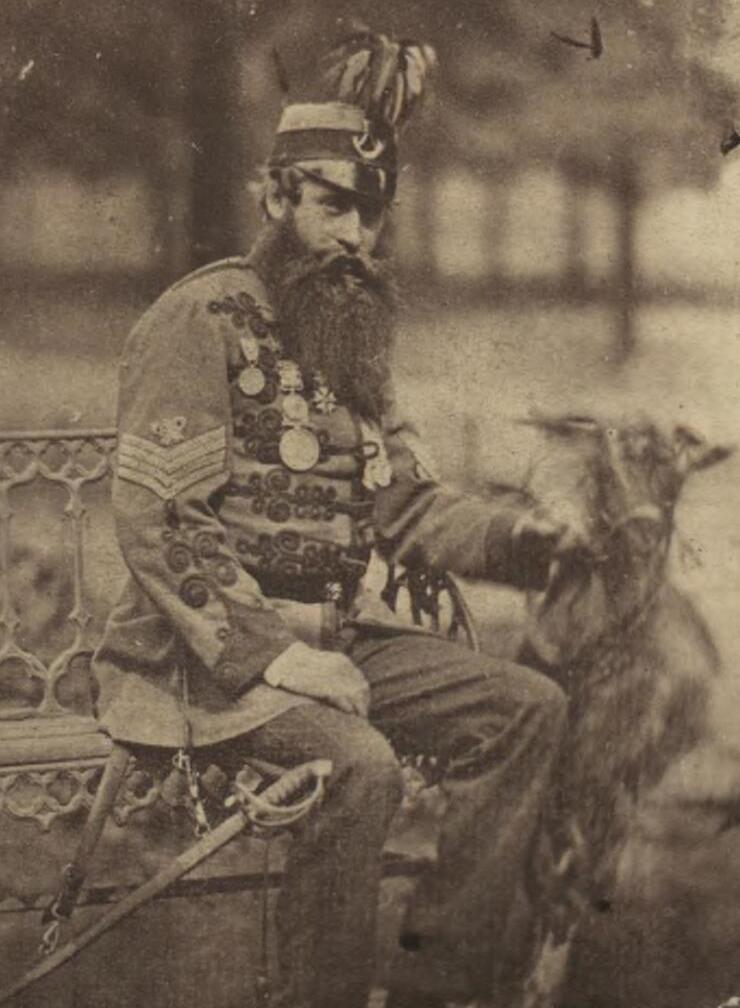
- Robert Shields (c. 1855)
- Born: c. 1827; Cardiff, Wales
- Died: 23 December 1864 (aged 37); Bombay, British India
- Burial place: St. Thomas Cathedral, Mumbai
- Military career
- Allegiance: United Kingdom
- Branch: British Army
- Rank: Corporal
- Units: 23rd Regiment of Foot
- Conflicts: Crimean War
- Awards: Victoria Cross

Robert Shields VC (c. 1827 – 23 December 1864) was a Welsh recipient of the Victoria Cross. He was born in Cardiff, Wales, in 1827 and died in Bombay, India, in 1864.

== Details ==
On the morning of 8 September 1855, during the Crimean War, Corporal Robert Shields volunteered to go along with Assistant Surgeon William Henry Thomas Sylvester in order to rescue an injured officer who had been incapacitated by a shot not far from their position outside the city of Sevastopol's walls during the siege of the city.

The wounded officer was one Lieutenant Dyneley, the Adjutant of Shields' own unit in the Royal Welch Fusiliers regiment. He had been shot and wounded near the Redan, a fort built close to Sevastopol, at this time it had been hastily occupied by more than a dozen Russian soldiers. It was an extremely dangerous and foolhardy thing to venture anywhere close to the Redan, as they would be well within range of all manner of enemy guns. Nevertheless, Sylvester and Shields decided to attempt to save the wounded man.

Together, they reached the lieutenant; however, they quickly noticed that his wounds were far more serious than they had anticipated. Sylvester dressed Dyneley's wounds as well as he was able while under heavy fire from the Redan and returned to the cover of their trenches, bringing with them the injured man. Dyneley later died from his wounds.

For their bravery, both men were awarded the Victoria Cross, subsequently going on parade for the first presentation of the new medal. Sixty other men were present at Hyde Park on 26 June 1857. The recipients were made up of both the army and the navy, and they were presented with the award by Queen Victoria herself.

Later, after being posted to India at the end of the war, Robert Shields died in Bombay of complications from alcoholism on 23 December 1864. He was buried in the Roman Catholic Archdiocese of Bombay. It has been claimed that Shields was the first Welsh VC winner, but the first Welshman to earn a VC was Hugh Rowlands, who was also granted his award in February 1857.
