= Leslie Manser =

Recipient of the Victoria Cross

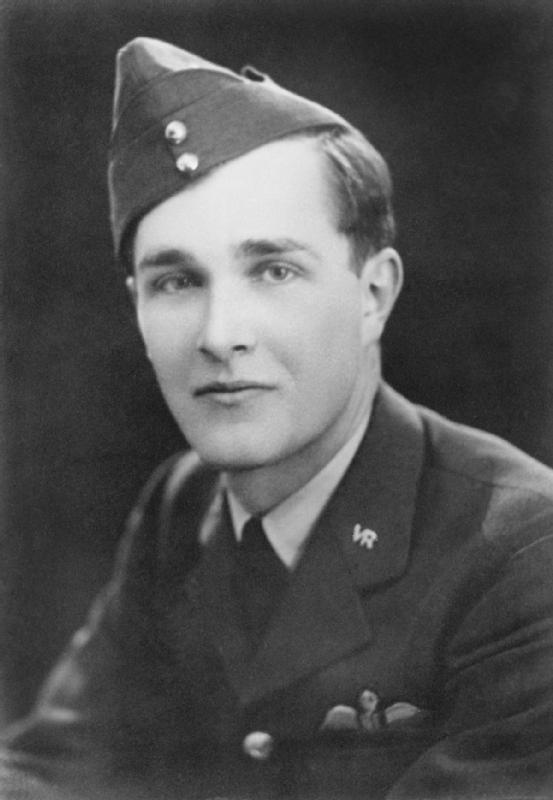
- Born: 11 May 1922; New Delhi, British India
- Died: 31 May 1942 (aged 20); Bree, German-occupied Belgium
- Burial place: Heverlee War Cemetery, Leuven
- Relatives: John Neil Randle VC (brother-in-law)
- Military career
- Allegiance: United Kingdom
- Branch: Royal Air Force Volunteer Reserve
- Service years: 1940–1942
- Rank: Flying officer
- Conflicts: Second World War: European air campaign; Cologne bombing campaign; Operation Millenium †
- Awards: Victoria Cross

Leslie Thomas Manser, VC (11 May 1922 – 31 May 1942) was a British bomber pilot and a recipient of the Victoria Cross, which was awarded posthumously following an attack on the German city of Cologne.

== Early life ==
Leslie Thomas Manser was born in New Delhi, India, during his father's employment as an engineer with the Post and Telegraph Department and, when the family returned to Britain, they settled in Radlett, Hertfordshire. He was a pupil of Victoria Boys' School, Kurseong, Darjeeling and Aldenham School, Elstree, Hertfordshire.

== Royal Air Force ==
Manser was accepted by the Royal Air Force (RAF) in August 1940, and was commissioned as a pilot officer in May 1941. After a navigational course and final operational training at No. 14 Operational Training Unit, RAF Cottesmore, he was posted to No. 50 Squadron operating the Handley Page Hampden at RAF Swinderby, Lincolnshire, on 27 August.

Two days after joining his squadron, Manser experienced his first operation: as a second pilot, he took part in a bombing raid on Frankfurt. During the next two months he flew six more sorties against targets including Berlin, Hamburg and Karlsruhe, before being posted to No. 25 Operational Training Unit, Finningley on 7 November and a month later posted back to No. 14 Operational Training Unit as an instructor.

Manser served briefly with No. 420 Squadron RCAF (Hampdens) from March to April 1942 when he rejoined No. 50 Squadron then operating from RAF Skellingthorpe, and converted to the new Avro Manchester medium bomber. He piloted one of the new aircraft during a leaflet drop over Paris, and flew a further five sorties during April and May. Manser was promoted to flying officer on 6 May.

Participating in Operation Millenium, a bombing raid on Cologne on the night of 30 May 1942, Manser was captain and first pilot of Avro Manchester bomber 'D' for Dog. As he came over the target, his aircraft was caught in searchlights and although he bombed the target successfully from 7,000 ft (2,100 m) it was hit by flak. In an effort to escape the anti-aircraft fire he took violent evasive action, this reduced his altitude to only 1,000 ft (300 m) but he did not escape the flak until he was clear of the city. By this time the rear gunner was wounded, the front cabin full of smoke and the port engine overheating. Rather than abandon the aircraft and be captured, Manser tried to get the aircraft and crew to safety. The port engine then burst into flames, burning the wing and reducing airspeed to a dangerously low level. The crew made preparations to abandon the aircraft, by then barely controllable and with a crash inevitable. The aircraft was by now over Belgium, and Manser ordered the crew to bail out but refused the offer of a parachute for himself. He remained at the controls and sacrificed himself in order to save his crew. As the crew parachuted down they saw the bomber crash in flames into a dyke at Bree, Belgium, 13 mi (21 km) north east of Genk.

Pilot Officer Barnes was taken prisoner, but Sergeant Baveystock, Pilot Officer Horsley, Sergeant King, Sergeant Mills and Sergeant Naylor all evaded capture and made their way back to the United Kingdom. The testimonies of the five evaders were instrumental in the posthumous award of the Victoria Cross for Manser. The citation for the award read:

... In pressing home his attack in the face of strong opposition, in striving, against heavy odds, to bring back his aircraft and crew and, finally, when in extreme peril, thinking only of the safety of his comrades, Flying Officer Manser displayed determination and valour of the highest order.

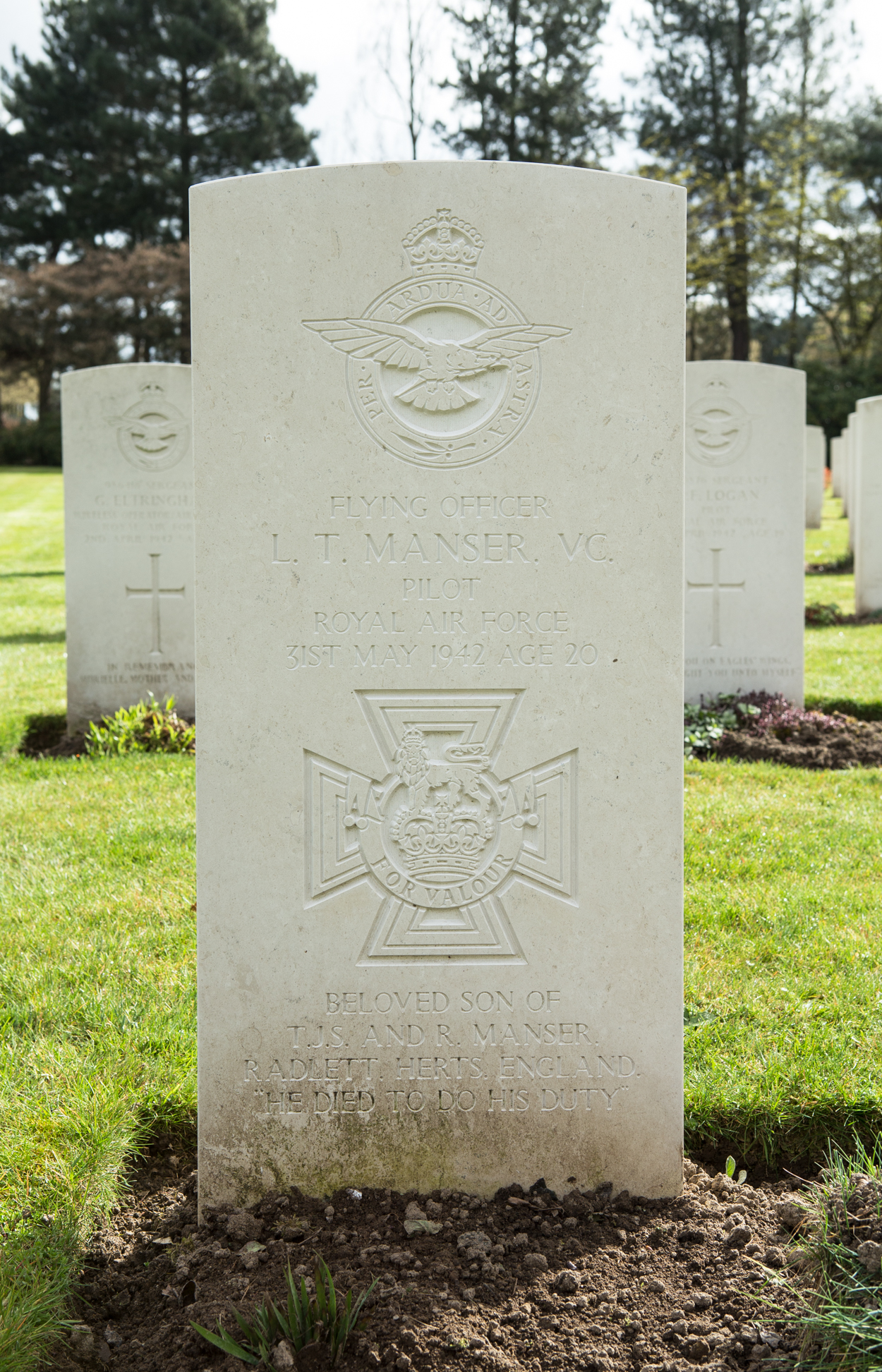
Grave, Heverlee War Cemetery

Manser is buried at the Heverlee War Cemetery in Leuven, Belgium.

Manser was the brother-in-law of British Army captain John Neil Randle, who was posthumously awarded the Victoria Cross in 1944.

== Legacy ==
On part of the old RAF Skellingthorpe airfield from which Manser flew his last sortie, a new primary school was built. It was opened in 1981 and named the Leslie Manser Primary School. On 31 June 2004 a Memorial to Manser was unveiled in natural domain the "Zig", Stamprooierbroek near Molenbeersel, Kinrooi in the north-east of Belgium.

Manser's Victoria Cross is on display in the Lord Ashcroft Gallery at the Imperial War Museum, London.
