= Henry Eric Harden =

British soldier who was awarded the Victoria Cross (1912-1945)

Henry Eric Harden VC
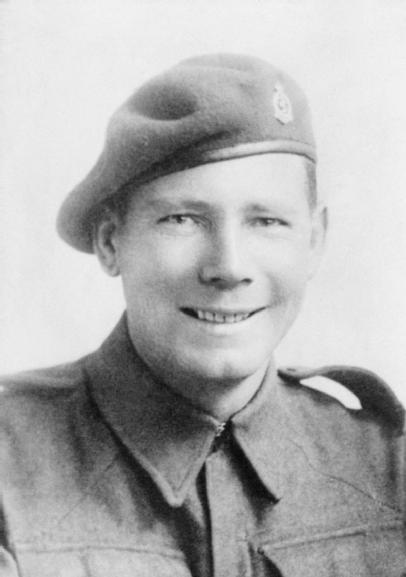
- Born: 23 February 1912; Northfleet, Kent
- Died: 23 January 1945 (aged 32); Brachterbeek, Roer Triangle, Netherlands
- Burial place: Nederweert War Cemetery, Netherlands
- Military career
- Allegiance: United Kingdom
- Branch: British Army
- Service years: 1942 - 1945
- Rank: Lance Corporal
- Units: Royal Army Medical Corps
- Conflicts: Western Front: Operation Blackcock †
- Awards: Victoria Cross

Henry Eric Harden VC (23 February 1912 – 23 January 1945) was a British soldier who was awarded the Victoria Cross, the most prestigious award for gallantry in the face of the enemy that can be awarded to British and Commonwealth forces, during the Second World War

Harden was a medic attached to a Royal Marine commando unit and was awarded the VC posthumously for his attempts to rescue three wounded soldiers during which he was killed.

== Action ==
Harden was a 32-year-old, lance-corporal in the Royal Army Medical Corps attached as an orderly to No. 45 (Royal Marine) Commando. He was married and father of a son and daughter.

On morning of 23 January 1945 during Operation Blackcock, at Brachterbeek in the Netherlands, the leading section of the Commando troop to which Lance-Corporal Harden was attached came under heavy machine-gun fire in an open field. The section made for cover of nearby houses but three men and their officer, lieutenant Corey, were seriously wounded and left in the open. Harden went out to them and treated their wounds while under intense mortar and machine-gun fire. He was wounded in his side as he carried one man back to the aid post, which had been set up in one of the houses along the Stationsweg in Brachterbeek.

Attempts to recover the other men with cover provided by tanks were beaten off by enemy anti-tank guns. The use of a smoke screen for cover was also ineffective.

Harden was then permitted to returned with a volunteer stretcher party for the other wounded. While bringing in the second casualty the rescue party came under enemy fire which killed the wounded Commando. Harden and stretcher party returned and while bringing back the last man ( Lieutenant Corey had demanded he be recovered last) Harden was shot through the head and killed instantly.

He was posthumously awarded the Victoria Cross for his fearless action.

== Memorials ==
On the bridge near the mill there is a plaque to commemorate Lance Corporal Harden.

Harden is buried in the Commonwealth War Graves Commission cemetery at Nederweert, Limburg, the Netherlands.

Known locally by his friends & family simply as Eric, his death was commemorated in 2021 in his home town of Northfleet.

Plaque

His Victoria Cross is displayed at the Army Medical Services Museum in Mytchett, Surrey.

== Bibliography ==
- Ingleton, Roy (2011). Kent VCs. Pen and Sword Books. ISBN 978-1848844094.
- Snelling, Stephen (2012). Commando Medic: Doc Harden VC. History Press Limited. ISBN 978-0752479439.
