= List of Royal Engineers recipients of the Victoria Cross =

The Victoria Cross

This is a list of Royal Engineers recipients of the Victoria Cross.The Victoria Cross (VC) is a military decoration that may be bestowed upon members of the British or Commonwealth armed forces for acts of valour or gallantry performed in the face of the enemy. Within the British honours system and those of many Commonwealth nations it is the highest award a soldier can receive for actions in combat. It was established in 1856 and since then has been awarded 1,356 times, including three service personnel who were awarded the VC twice.

The VC was introduced on 29 January 1856 by Queen Victoria to reward acts of valour during the Crimean War. The traditional explanation of the source of the gunmetal from which the medals are struck is that it derives from Russian cannon captured at the siege of Sevastopol. Recent research has thrown doubt on this story, suggesting a variety of origins. The original Royal Warrant did not contain a specific clause regarding posthumous awards, although official policy was to not award the VC posthumously. Between 1897 and 1901, several notices were issued in the London Gazette regarding soldiers who would have been awarded the VC had they survived. In a partial reversal of policy in 1902, six of the soldiers mentioned were granted the VC, but not "officially" awarded the medal. In 1907, the posthumous policy was completely reversed and medals were sent to the next of kin of the six officers and men. The Victoria Cross warrant was not officially amended to explicitly allow posthumous awards until 1920 but one quarter of all awards for the First World War were posthumous.

Due to its rarity, the VC is highly prized and the medal has fetched over £400,000 at auction. A number of public and private collections are devoted to the Victoria Cross. The private collection of Lord Ashcroft, amassed since 1986, contains over one-tenth of all VCs awarded. Following a 2008 donation to the Imperial War Museum, the Ashcroft collection went on public display alongside the museum's Victoria and George Cross collection in November 2010. Since 1990, three Commonwealth countries that retain the Queen as head of state have instituted their own versions of the VC. As a result, the original Victoria Cross is sometimes referred to as the "Commonwealth Victoria Cross" or the "Imperial Victoria Cross", to distinguish it from the newer awards.

The Corps of Royal Engineers can trace its origins back 900 years, during which time they have been involved in every major conflict the British Army has fought in. The Royal Flying Corps – the forerunner of the Royal Air Force – and the present day Royal Signals were originally part of the Corps. Their first recipient of the Victoria Cross received the award for actions performed during the Crimean War, while the last came during the Second World War. In total, thirty-six Royal Engineers have been awarded the Victoria Cross, across ten different conflicts or campaigns.

== Royal Engineer recipients ==
Name	Date	Conflict	Location
Adam Archibald	4 November 1918	First World War	Sambre–Oise Canal
Fenton Aylmer	2 December 1891	Hunza-Nagar Campaign	Nilt
Mark Sever Bell	4 February 1874	Third Anglo-Ashanti War	Ordashu
John Chard	22–23 January 1879	Anglo-Zulu War	Rorke's Drift
Brett Cloutman	6 November 1918	First World War	Pont-sur-Sambre
Clifford Coffin	31 July 1917	First World War	Westhoek
James Morris Colquhoun Colvin	16–17 September 1897	First Mohmand Campaign	Mohmand Valley
James Lennox Dawson	13 October 1915	First World War	Hohenzollern Redoubt
Robert James Thomas Digby-Jones	6 January 1900	Second Boer War	Ladysmith
Thomas Frank Durrant	28 March 1942	Second World War	St Nazaire (Note: Attached to No. 2 Commando.)
Howard Craufurd Elphinstone	18 June 1855	Crimean War	Sevastopol
George de Cardonnel Elmsall Findlay	4 November 1918	First World War	Sambre–Oise Canal
Gerald Graham	18 June 1855	Crimean War	Sevastopol
William Hackett	22–23 June 1916	First World War	Givenchy-lès-la-Bassée
Reginald Clare Hart	31 January 1879	Second Anglo-Afghan War	Bazar Valley
Lanoe Hawker	25 July 1915	First World War	Passendale (Note: Attached to the Royal Flying Corps.)
Charles Jarvis	23 August 1914	First World War	Jemappes
Frederick Henry Johnson	25 September 1915	First World War	Hill 70
William Henry Johnston	14 September 1914	First World War	Missy-sur-Aisne
Frank Howard Kirby	2 June 1900	Second Boer War	Delagoa Bay
Cecil Leonard Knox	22 March 1918	First World War	Tugny
Edward Pemberton Leach	17 March 1879	Second Anglo-Afghan War	Maidanah
Peter Leitch	18 June 1855	Crimean War	Sevastopol
William James Lendrim	14 February 1855	Crimean War	Sevastopol
Wilbraham Lennox	20 November 1854	Crimean War	Sevastopol
Henry MacDonald	19 April 1855	Crimean War	Sevastopol
Edward Mannock	17 June 1918; 7 July 1918; 14 July 1918; 19 July 1918; 20 July 1918; 22 July 1918	First World War	Western Front (Note: Attached to the Royal Flying Corps.)
Cyril Gordon Martin	12 March 1915	First World War	Spanbroek Molen
James McPhie	14 October 1918	First World War	Sensée Canal
Philip Neame	19 December 1914	First World War	Neuve-Chapelle
John Perie	18 June 1855	Crimean War	Sevastopol
Claud Raymond	21 March 1945	Second World War	Talaku
John Ross	21 July 1855	Crimean War	Sevastopol
Michael Sleavon	3 April 1858	Indian Mutiny	Jhansi
Thomas Colclough Watson	16 September 1897	First Mohmand Campaign	Mohmand Valley
Arnold Horace Santo Waters	4 November 1918	First World War	Sambre–Oise Canal
Theodore Wright	23 August 1914	First World War	Jemappes
