= John Niel Randle =

Recipient of the Victoria Cross

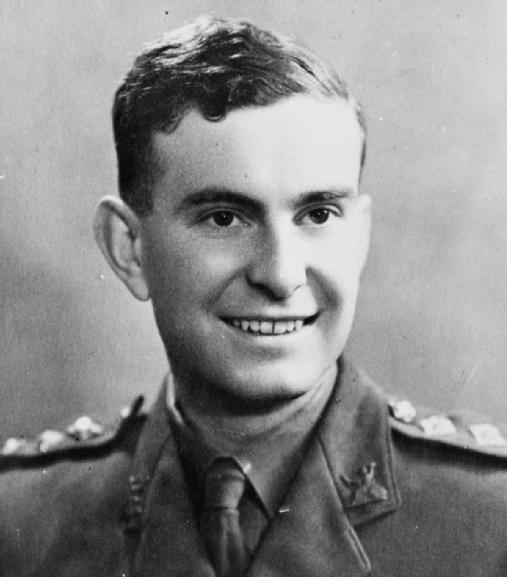
- Born: 22 December 1917; Benares (now Varanasi), British India
- Died: 6 May 1944 (aged 26); Kohima, Nagaland
- Burial place: Kohima War Cemetery
- Relatives: Leslie Thomas Manser VC (brother-in-law)
- Military career
- Allegiance: United Kingdom
- Branch: British Army
- Service years: 1940–1944 †
- Rank: Captain
- Service number: 130097
- Units: Royal Norfolk Regiment
- Conflicts: Second World War: Burma campaign; Burma campaign 1944; Operation U-Go; Battle of Kohima †
- Awards: Victoria Cross

Captain John Niel Randle, VC (22 December 1917 – 6 May 1944) was a British Army officer and a recipient of the Victoria Cross (VC), the highest award for gallantry in the face of the enemy that can be awarded to British and Commonwealth forces. His was one of three Second World War VCs awarded for action in India, the other two being awarded to John Pennington Harman (also at the Battle of Kohima) and Abdul Hafiz at the Battle of Imphal.

== Early life ==
John Niel Randle was born in India, the son of Edith Joan, daughter of William Chaffey Whitby, and Dr. Herbert Niel Randle, Librarian of the India Office Library, who was also Professor of Philosophy at Queen's College, Benares and a writer on Indian philosophy.

Randle was educated at the Dragon School, Marlborough College, and Merton College, Oxford. At Oxford he qualified in law. His best friend there, Leonard Cheshire, was awarded the VC in the Second World War. Randle married Mavis Ellen Manser of Holywell, Oxford, sister of Leslie Thomas Manser who was awarded the VC posthumously in 1942 after a bombing raid on Cologne.

== Military career ==
Randle was commissioned a second lieutenant in the Royal Norfolk Regiment in May 1940. At the age of 26, he was promoted to temporary captain whilst serving with the 2nd Battalion, Royal Norfolk Regiment.

Captain Randle was commander of 'B' Company, 2nd Battalion, Royal Norfolk Regiment. On 4 May 1944 during the Battle of Kohima in northeast India, he was ordered to attack the Japanese flank on General Purpose Transport (GPT) Ridge during the relief and clearance of Kohima. The citation from the London Gazette reads:

On the 4th May, 1944, at Kohima in Assam, a Battalion of the Royal Norfolk Regiment attacked the Japanese positions on a nearby ridge. Captain Randle took over command of the Company which was leading the attack when the Company Commander was severely wounded. His handling of a difficult situation in the face of heavy fire was masterly and although wounded himself in the knee by grenade splinters he continued to inspire his men by his initiative, courage and outstanding leadership until the Company had captured its objective and consolidated its position. He then went forward and brought in all the wounded men who were lying outside the perimeter. In spite of his painful wound Captain Randle refused to be evacuated and insisted on carrying out a personal reconnaissance with great daring in bright moonlight prior to a further attack by his Company on the position to which the enemy had withdrawn. At dawn on 6th May the attack opened, led by Captain Randle, and one of the platoons succeeded in reaching the crest of the hill held by the Japanese. Another platoon, however, ran into heavy medium machine gun fire from a bunker on the reverse slope of the feature. Captain Randle immediately appreciated that this particular bunker covered not only the rear of his new position but also the line of communication of the battalion and therefore the destruction of the enemy post was imperative if the operation was to succeed. With utter disregard of the obvious danger to himself Captain Randle charged the Japanese machine gun post single-handed with rifle and bayonet. Although bleeding in the face and mortally wounded by numerous bursts of machine gun fire he reached the bunker and silenced the gun with a grenade thrown through the bunker slit. He then flung his body across the slit so that the aperture should be completely sealed. The bravery shown by this officer could not have been surpassed and by his self-sacrifice he saved the lives of many of his men and enabled not only his own Company but the whole Battalion to gain its objective and win a decisive victory over the enemy.

== The medal ==
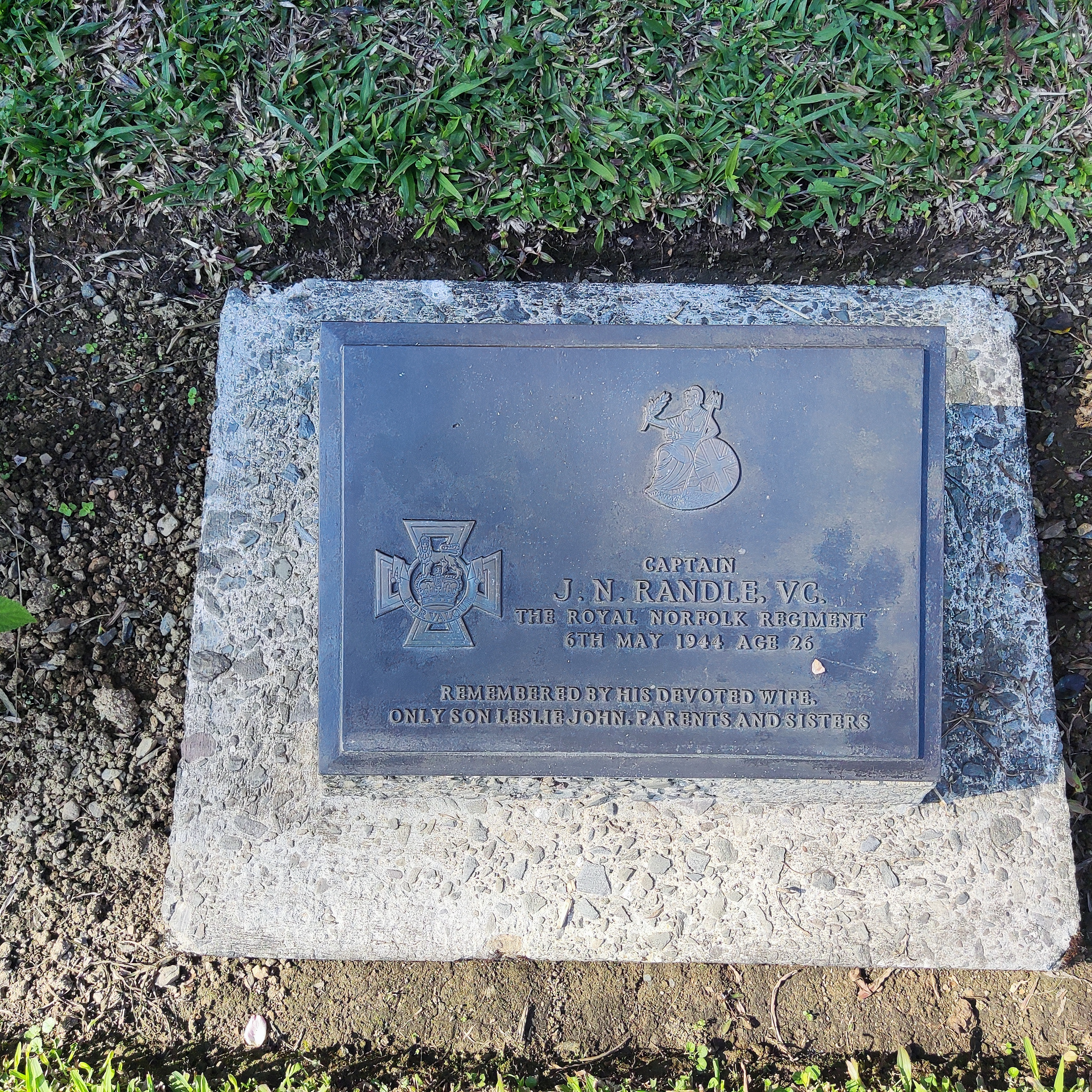
Grave marker in Kohima

His Victoria Cross is on loan to the Imperial War Museum by his son John. It is displayed alongside that of his friend Leonard Cheshire.

== Legacy ==
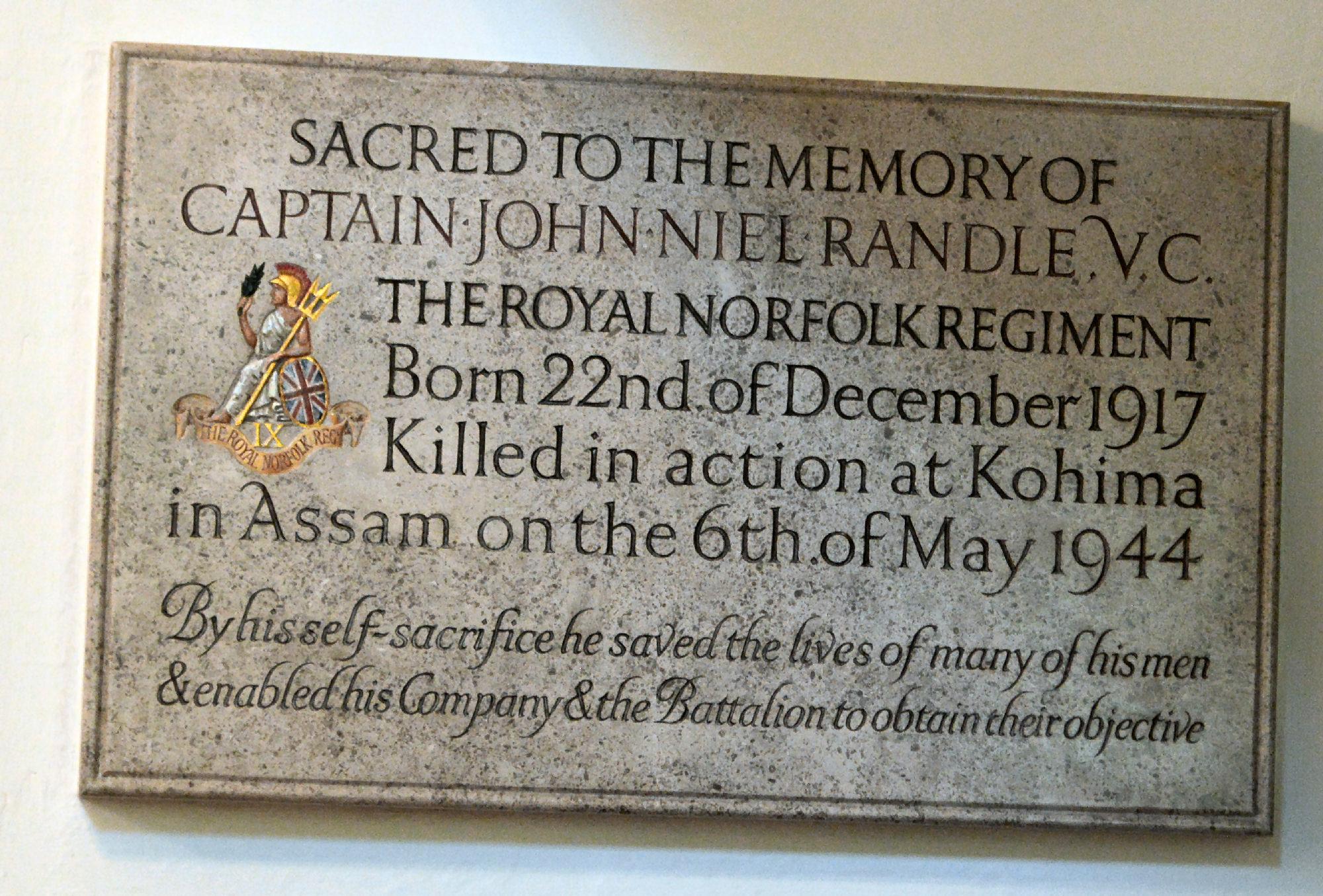
Memorial in St Peter's Church

Randle was portrayed by Tom Hiddleston in the 2006 television docudrama Victoria Cross Heroes, which included archive footage, dramatisations of his actions and an interview with his son and grandson.

A memorial to Captain Randle is in St Peter's Church, Petersham.
