= Edgar Inkson =

Recipient of the Victoria Cross (1872–1947)

Edgar Thomas Inkson VC DSO
- Inkson c. 1900
- Born: 5 April 1872; Nainital, British India
- Died: 19 February 1947 (aged 74); Chichester, West Sussex, England
- Burial place: Brookwood Cemetery; 51°18′04″N 0°37′52″W
- Military career
- Allegiance: United Kingdom
- Branch: British Army
- Service years: 1899–1917
- Rank: Colonel
- Unit: Royal Army Medical Corps
- Conflicts: Second Boer War; World War I
- Awards: Victoria Cross; Distinguished Service Order

Colonel Edgar Thomas Inkson VC DSO (5 April 1872 –19 February 1947) was a recipient of the Victoria Cross (the highest and most prestigious award for gallantry in the face of the enemy that can be awarded to British and Commonwealth forces) for rescuing a wounded officer under heavy fire during the Second Boer War while serving in the Royal Army Medical Corps.

== Early life ==
He was born at Naini Tal, India, on 5 April 1872. He was educated at the Edinburgh Collegiate School and at University College London. He joined the Royal Army Medical Corps as a Lieutenant in 1899.

== Victoria Cross ==
Inkson was 27 years old, and was attached to The Royal Inniskilling Fusiliers during the Second Boer War when the following deed took place on 24 February 1900, at Hart's Hill, Colenso, South Africa for which he was awarded the VC:

On the 24th February, 1900, Lieutenant Inkson carried Second Lieutenant Devenish (who was severely wounded and unable to walk) for three or four hundred yards under a very heavy fire to a place of safety. The ground over which Lieutenant Inkson had to move was much exposed, there being no cover available.

He was promoted to captain while still serving in South Africa. Captain Inkson personally received the decoration by King Edward VII during an investiture at Buckingham Palace on 12 May 1902.

His Victoria Cross is displayed at the Army Medical Services Museum, Mytchett, England.

He appeared on a cigarette card in 1902, number 63 from the series, 'VC Heroes - Boer War'.

== Later career ==
Inkson also saw further action in the Boer War with the 27th Royal Inniskilling Fusiliers at Vaalkrantz, Spion Kop and the relief of Ladysmith

He later achieved the rank of colonel after serving in the First World War. where he commanded No 2 Field Ambulance, 1st Division, and was awarded the DSO in 1917.

Inkson retired in 1926. He died in 1947 and is buried in Brookwood Cemetery.
