= William Henry Thomas Sylvester =

Recipient of the Victoria Cross

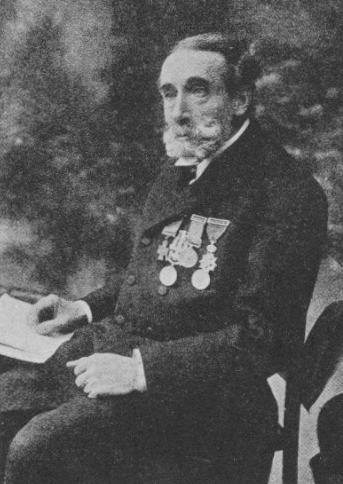
- Born: 16 April 1831; Devizes, Wiltshire, England
- Died: 13 March 1920 (aged 88); Paignton, Devon, England
- Burial place: Paignton Cemetery
- Military career
- Allegiance: United Kingdom
- Branch: British Army
- Rank: Surgeon Major
- Units: 23rd Regiment of Foot; 25th Regiment of Foot
- Conflicts: Crimean War; Indian Mutiny
- Awards: Victoria Cross; Légion d'honneur (France)

William Henry Thomas Sylvester VC (16 April 1831 – 13 March 1920) was an English recipient of the Victoria Cross, the highest and most prestigious award for gallantry in the face of the enemy that can be awarded to British and Commonwealth forces.

== Details ==
Sylvester was 24 years old, and an assistant surgeon in the 23rd Regiment of Foot (later The Royal Welch Fusiliers), British Army during the Crimean War when the following deed took place for which he was awarded the VC.

On 8 September 1855, at Sebastopol, Crimea, near the Redan, Assistant Surgeon Sylvester went with a corporal (Robert Shields) to the aid of an officer who was mortally wounded and remained with him, dressing his wounds, in a most dangerous and exposed situation. Again, on 18 September this officer was at the front, under heavy fire, attending the wounded.

== Further information ==
He later achieved the rank of surgeon major and was the last surviving VC holder of the Crimean War. He was reputed to have worked with Florence Nightingale.

== The medal ==
His Victoria Cross is displayed at the Army Medical Services Museum, Mytchett, Surrey.
