= List of Indian Mutiny Victoria Cross recipients =

Map showing the Indian Princely states during the rebellion of 1857

The Victoria Cross (VC) was introduced in Great Britain on 29 January 1856 by Queen Victoria to reward acts of valour during the Crimean War. For the Indian Mutiny (also known as India's First War of Independence, Revolt of 1857, or the Sepoy Mutiny) the VC was awarded to 182 members of the British Armed Forces, the Honourable East Indies Company (HEIC) and civilians under its command. The VC is the highest British honour and is awarded for valour "in the face of the enemy". Created in 1856 for the British Army and Royal Navy, eligibility was extended in 1857 to members of the HEIC and in 1858 to non-military personnel bearing arms as volunteers.

Queen Victoria created the tradition of the British monarch presenting the VC to the recipient, personally presenting 74 of the 111 awards for the Crimean War. Many VCs for the Indian Mutiny were sent to India for presentation and while there is documentation for 42 presentations, the information on 51 presentations which were likely presented in India is vague and it not known if the medal was personally presented or received by post. There were 18 Indian Mutiny VCs sent to next of kin where the award was posthumous, or the recipient died before presentation. The Queen personally presented 63 Indian Mutiny awards after the recipients returned to the UK.

The Indian Mutiny began as a mutiny of sepoys of British East India Company's army on 10 May 1857, in the town of Meerut. It soon erupted into other mutinies and civilian rebellions largely in the upper Gangetic plain and central India, with the major hostilities confined to present-day Uttar Pradesh, Bihar, northern Madhya Pradesh, and the Delhi region. The rebellion posed a considerable threat to Company power in that region, and it was contained only with the fall of Gwalior on 20 June 1858. The rebellion proved to be an important watershed in Indian history; it led to the dissolution of the East India Company in 1858, and forced the British to reorganise the army, the financial system, and the administration in India. India was thereafter governed directly from London—by the British government India Office and a cabinet level Secretary of State for India—in the new British Raj, a system of governance that lasted until 1947.

Indian troops were not originally eligible for the VC, because since 1837 they had been eligible for the Indian Order of Merit—the oldest British gallantry award for general issue. When the VC was created, Indian troops were still controlled by the Honourable East India Company, and did not come under Crown control until 1860. European officers and men serving with the Honourable East India Company were not eligible for the Indian Order of Merit; the VC was extended to cover them in October 1857. The first citations of the VC varied in the details of each action; some specify one date, some date ranges, some the name of the battle and others have both sets of information. The Indian Mutiny holds the record for the most VCs won in a single day; 24 on 16 November 1857, of which 23 were at the Second Relief of Lucknow and one was for an action south of Delhi.

The original royal warrant did not address the question of posthumous awards, and a policy to avoid posthumous awards was adopted. Between the Indian Mutiny in 1857 and the beginning of the Second Boer War, the names of nine officers and men were published in the London Gazette with a memorandum stating they would have been awarded the Victoria Cross had they survived. A further three notices were published in the London Gazette in September 1900 and April 1901 for the Second Boer War. On 8 August 1902, as an exception to policy for the Second Boer War, a notice was published stating the Victoria Crosses were to be sent to next of kin of the three mentioned in the notices in 1900 and 1901. In the same notice the first official posthumous awards were announced. Five years later in 1907, the posthumous policy was reversed for earlier wars, and medals were sent to the next of kin of the six of nine officers and men whose names were mentioned in notices in the Gazette dating back to the Indian Mutiny. Prior to the reversal of policy It had been discovered that the crosses of three of the five Indian Mutiny memoranda names had been sent to next of kin shortly after the memoranda was gazetted. The Victoria Cross warrant was explicitly amended to allow posthumous awards in 1920, but one quarter of all awards for World War I were posthumous..

== Recipients ==
Portrait	Name	Unit	Date of action	Place of action
	Henry Addison	43rd Regiment of Foot	2 January 1859	Kurrereah, India
	Frederick Aikman	4th Bengal Native Infantry	1 March 1858	Amethi, India
	Robert Aitken	13th Bengal Native Infantry	30 June 1857 to 22 November 1857	Lucknow, India
	Charles Anderson	2nd Dragoon Guards	8 October 1858	Sundeela Oudh, India
	Augustus Anson	84th Regiment of Foot	28 September 1857, 16 November 1857	Bolandshahr, India; Lucknow, India
	Charles Baker	Bengal Military Police Battalion	27 September 1858	Suhejnee, Near Peroo, India
	Valentine Bambrick	60th Rifles	6 May 1858	Bareilly, India
	William Bankes	7th Queen's Own Hussars	19 March 1858	Lucknow, India
	James Blair	2nd Bombay Light Cavalry	12 August 1857, 23 October 1857	Neemuch, India; Jeerum, India
	Robert Blair	2nd Dragoon Guards	28 September 1857	Bolandshahr, India
	Andrew Bogle	78th Regiment of Foot	29 July 1857	Oonao, India
	Abraham Boulger	84th Regiment of Foot	12 July 1857 to 25 September 1857	Lucknow, India
	William Bradshaw	90th Regiment of Foot	26 September 1857	Lucknow, India
	Joseph Brennan	Royal Regiment of Artillery	3 April 1858	Jhansi, India
	Francis Brown	1st Bengal European Fusiliers	16 November 1857	Narnoul, India
	Sam Browne	46th Bengal Native Infantry	31 August 1858	Seerporah, India
	John Buckley	Commissariat Department	11 May 1857	Delhi, India
	Thomas Butler	1st Bengal European Fusiliers	9 March 1858	Lucknow, India
	James Byrne	86th Regiment of Foot	3 April 1858	Jhansi, India
	Thomas Cadell	2nd Bengal European Fusiliers	12 June 1857	Delhi, India
	William Cafe	56th Bengal Native Infantry	15 April 1858	Fort Ruhya, India
	Aylmer Cameron	72nd Regiment of Foot	30 March 1858	Kotah, India
	Patrick Carlin	13th Regiment of Foot	6 April 1858	Azumgurh, India
	James Champion	8th King's Royal Irish Hussars	8 September 1858	Beejapore, India
	George Chicken	Naval Brigade	27 September 1858	Suhejnee, Near Peroo, India
	Herbert Clogstoun	19th Madras Native Infantry	15 January 1859	Chichumbah, India
	Hugh Cochrane	86th Regiment of Foot	1 April 1858	Jhansi, India
	William Connolly	Bengal Horse Artillery	7 July 1857	Jhelum, India
	Walter Cook	42nd Regiment of Foot	15 January 1859	Maylah Ghat, India
	Cornelius Coughlan	75th Regiment of Foot	8 June 1857	Delhi, India
	Joseph Crowe	78th Regiment of Foot	12 August 1857	Boursekee Chowkee, India
	William Cubitt	13th Bengal Native Infantry	30 June 1857	Chinhut, India
	John Daunt	11th Bengal Native Infantry	2 October 1857	Ghota Behar, India
	James Davis	42nd Regiment of Foot	15 April 1858	Fort Ruhya, India
	Denis Dempsey	10th Regiment of Foot	12 August 1857, 14 March 1858	Lucknow, India
	Bernard Diamond	Bengal Horse Artillery	28 September 1857	Bolandshahr, India
	John Divane	60th Rifles	10 September 1857	Delhi, India
	Patrick Donohoe	9th Queen's Royal Lancers	28 September 1857	Bolandshahr, India
	William Dowling	32nd Regiment of Foot	4 July 1857, 27 September 1857	Lucknow, India
	Thomas Duffy	1st Madras European Fusiliers	26 September 1857	Lucknow, India
	John Dunlay	93rd Regiment of Foot	16 November 1857	Lucknow, India
	Denis Dynon	53rd Regiment of Foot	2 October 1857	Ghota Behar, India
	Francis Farquharson	42nd Regiment of Foot	9 March 1858	Lucknow, India
	Alfred Ffrench	53rd Regiment of Foot	16 November 1857	Lucknow, India
	Richard Fitzgerald	Bengal Horse Artillery	28 September 1857	Bolandshahr, India
	Thomas Flinn	64th Regiment of Foot	28 November 1857	Cawnpore, India
	George Forrest	Bengal Veterans Establishment	11 May 1857	Delhi, India
	Charles Fraser	7th Queen's Own Hussars	31 December 1858	River Raptee, India
	John Freeman	9th Queen's Royal Lancers	10 October 1857	Agra, India
	William Gardner	42nd Regiment of Foot	5 May 1858	Bareilly, India
	Stephen Garvin	60th Rifles	23 June 1857	Delhi, India
	Peter Gill	Loodiana Regiment	4 June 1857	Benares, India
	William Goat	9th Queen's Royal Lancers	6 March 1858	Lucknow, India
	Charles Goodfellow	Bombay Engineers	6 October 1859	Kathiawar, India
	Henry Gore-Browne	32nd Regiment of Foot	21 August 1857	Lucknow, India
	Charles Gough	5th Bengal European Cavalry	15 August 1857, 18 August 1857, 27 January 1858, 3 February 1858	Khurkowdah, India; Not known Shumshabad, India; Meangunge, India
	Hugh Gough	1st Bengal European Light Cavalry	12 November 1857, 25 February 1858	Alumbagh, India; Jellalabad, India
	Patrick Graham	90th Regiment of Foot	17 November 1857	Lucknow, India
	Peter Grant	93rd Regiment of Foot	16 November 1857	Lucknow, India
	Robert Grant	5th Regiment of Foot	24 September 1857	Alumbagh, India
	Patrick Green	75th Regiment of Foot	11 September 1857	Delhi, India
	John Guise	90th Regiment of Foot	16 November 1857	Lucknow, India
	Thomas Hackett	23rd Regiment of Foot	18 November 1857	Lucknow, India
	William Hall	Naval Brigade	16 November 1857	Lucknow, India
	Thomas Hancock	9th Queen's Royal Lancers	19 June 1857	Delhi, India
	Hastings Harington	Bengal Horse Artillery	14 November 1857 to 22 November 1857	Lucknow, India
	John Harrison	Naval Brigade	16 November 1857	Lucknow, India
	Henry Hartigan	9th Queen's Royal Lancers	8 June 1857; 10 October 1857	Delhi, India; Agra, India
	Henry Havelock-Allan	10th Regiment of Foot	16 July 1857	Cawnpore, India
	David Hawkes	Rifle Brigade	11 March 1858	Lucknow, India
	Robert Hawthorne	52nd Regiment of Foot	14 September 1857	Delhi, India
	Alfred Heathcote	60th Rifles	June to September 1857	Delhi, India
	Clement Heneage	8th King's Royal Irish Hussars	17 June 1858	Gwalior, India
	Samuel Hill	90th Regiment of Foot	16 November 1857	Lucknow, India
	James Hills	Bengal Horse Artillery	9 July 1857	Delhi, India
	George Hollis	8th King's Royal Irish Hussars	17 June 1858	Gwalior, India
	James Hollowell	78th Regiment of Foot	26 September 1857	Lucknow, India
	Joel Holmes	84th Regiment of Foot	25 September 1857	Lucknow, India
	Anthony Home	90th Regiment of Foot	26 September 1857	Lucknow, India
	Duncan Home	Bengal Sappers and Miners	14 September 1857	Delhi, India
	James Innes	Bengal Sappers and Miners	23 February 1858	Sultanpore, India
	Charles Irwin	53rd Regiment of Foot	16 November 1857	Lucknow, India
	Hanson Jarrett	26th Bengal Native Infantry	14 October 1858	Baroun, India
	Joseph Jee	78th Regiment of Foot	25 September 1857	Lucknow, India
	Edward Jennings	Bengal Horse Artillery	14 November 1857 to 22 November 1857	Lucknow, India
	Henry Jerome	86th Regiment of Foot	3 April 1858	Jhansi, India
	Alfred Jones	9th Queen's Royal Lancers	8 June 1857	Delhi, India
	Thomas Kavanagh	Bengal Civil Service	9 November 1857	Lucknow, India
	Richard Keatinge	Bombay Artillery	17 March 1858	Chundairee, India
	Robert Kells	9th Queen's Royal Lancers	28 September 1857	Bolandshahr, India
	James Kenny	53rd Regiment of Foot	16 November 1857	Lucknow, India
	William Kerr	24th Bombay Native Infantry	10 July 1857	Kolapore, India
	John Kirk	10th Regiment of Foot	4 June 1857	Benares, India
	George Lambert	84th Regiment of Foot	29 June 1857, 16 August 1857, 25 September 1857	Oonao, India; Bithoor, India; Lucknow, India
	Thomas Laughnan	Bengal Horse Artillery	14 November 1857 to 22 November 1857	Lucknow, India
	Samuel Lawrence	32nd Regiment of Foot	7 July 1857, 26 September 1857	Lucknow, India
	James Leith	14th Light Dragoons	1 April 1858	Betwa, India
	Harry Lyster	72nd Bengal Native Infantry	23 May 1858	Calpee, India
	David MacKay	93rd Regiment of Foot	16 November 1857	Lucknow, India
	Herbert Macpherson	78th Regiment of Foot	25 September 1857	Lucknow, India
	Patrick Mahoney	1st Madras European Fusiliers	21 September 1857	Mungulwar, India
	Ross Mangles	Bengal Civil Service	30 July 1857	Arrah, India
	Francis Maude	Royal Regiment of Artillery	25 September 1857	Lucknow, India
	Arthur Mayo	Naval Brigade	22 November 1857	Dacca, India
	William McBean	93rd Regiment of Foot	11 March 1858	Lucknow, India
	William McDonell	Bengal Civil Service	30 July 1857	Arrah, India
	John McGovern	1st Bengal European Fusiliers	23 June 1857	Delhi, India
	James McGuire	1st Bengal European Fusiliers	14 September 1857	Delhi, India
	Patrick McHale	5th Regiment of Foot	2 October 1857, 22 December 1857	Lucknow, India
	Hugh McInnes	Bengal Artillery	14 November 1857 to 22 November 1857	Lucknow, India
	Peter McManus	5th Regiment of Foot	26 September 1857	Lucknow, India
	Valentine McMaster	78th Regiment of Foot	25 September 1857	Lucknow, India
	Stewart McPherson	78th Regiment of Foot	26 September 1857	Lucknow, India
	Bernard McQuirt	95th Regiment of Foot	6 January 1858	Rowa, India
	Duncan Millar	42nd Regiment of Foot	15 January 1859	Maylah Ghat, India
	James Miller	Bengal Ordnance Depot	28 October 1857	Agra, India
	Thomas Monaghan	2nd Dragoon Guards	8 October 1858	Jamo, India
	George Monger	23rd Regiment of Foot	18 November 1857	Lucknow, India
	Samuel Morley	Military Train	15 April 1858	Azumgurh, India
	James Munro	93rd Regiment of Foot	16 November 1857	Lucknow, India
	Michael Murphy	Military Train	15 April 1858	Azumgurh, India
	Patrick Mylott	84th Regiment of Foot	12 July 1857 to 25 September 1857	Lucknow, India
	William Napier	13th Regiment of Foot	6 April 1858	Azumgurh, India
	William Nash	Rifle Brigade	11 March 1858	Lucknow, India
	Robert Newell	9th Queen's Royal Lancers	19 March 1858	Lucknow, India
	William Olpherts	Bengal Artillery	25 September 1857	Lucknow, India
	William Oxenham	32nd Regiment of Foot	30 June 1857	Lucknow, India
	James Park	Bengal Artillery	14 November 1857 to 22 November 1857	Lucknow, India
	John Paton	93rd Regiment of Foot	16 November 1857	Lucknow, India
	James Pearson	86th Regiment of Foot	3 April 1858	Jhansi, India
	John Pearson	8th King's Royal Irish Hussars	17 June 1858	Gwalior, India
	Everard Phillipps	11th Bengal Native Infantry	30 May 1857 to 18 September 1857	Delhi, India
	Harry Prendergast	Madras Engineers	21 November 1857	Mundisore, India
	Dighton Probyn	2nd Punjab Cavalry	1857 to 1858	Agra, India
	John Purcell	9th Queen's Royal Lancers	19 June 1857	Delhi, India
	Charles Pye	53rd Regiment of Foot	17 November 1857	Lucknow, India
	William Raynor	Bengal Veterans Establishment	11 May 1857	Delhi, India
	Herbert Reade	61st Regiment of Foot	14 September 1857	Delhi, India
	William Rennie	90th Regiment of Foot	21 September 1857, 25 September 1857	Lucknow, India
	George Renny	Bengal Horse Artillery	16 September 1857	Delhi, India
	George Richardson	34th Regiment of Foot	27 April 1859	Kewane Trans-Gogra, India
	Frederick Roberts	Bengal Horse Artillery	2 January 1858	Khodagunge, India
	James Roberts	9th Queen's Royal Lancers	28 September 1857	Bolandshahr, India
	Edward Robinson	Naval Brigade	13 March 1858	Lucknow, India
	Patrick Roddy	Bengal Army	27 September 1858	Kuthirga, India
	George Rodgers	71st Regiment of Foot	16 June 1858	Marar, India
	Matthew Rosamund	37th Bengal Native Infantry	4 June 1857	Benares, India
	David Rushe	9th Queen's Royal Lancers	19 March 1858	Lucknow, India
	John Ryan	1st Madras European Fusiliers	26 September 1857	Lucknow, India
	Miles Ryan	1st Bengal European Fusiliers	14 September 1857	Delhi, India
	Philip Salkeld	Bengal Sappers and Miners	14 September 1857	Delhi, India
	Nowell Salmon	Naval Brigade	16 November 1857	Lucknow, India
	Same Shaw	Rifle Brigade	13 June 1858	Lucknow, India
	Robert Shebbeare	60th Bengal Native Infantry	14 September 1857	Delhi, India
	John Simpson	42nd Regiment of Foot	15 April 1858	Fort Ruhya, India
	John Sinnott	84th Regiment of Foot	6 October 1857	Lucknow, India
	Michael Sleavon	Corps of Royal Engineers	3 April 1858	Jhansi, India
	Henry Smith	52nd Regiment of Foot	14 September 1857	Delhi, India
	John Smith	1st Madras European Fusiliers	16 November 1857	Lucknow, India
	John Smith	Bengal Sappers and Miners	14 September 1857	Delhi, India
	David Spence	9th Queen's Royal Lancers	17 January 1858	Shumsabad, India
	Edward Spence	42nd Regiment of Foot	15 April 1858	Fort Ruhya, India
	George Stewart	93rd Regiment of Foot	16 November 1857	Lucknow, India
	William Sutton	60th Rifles	2 August 1857 to 13 September 1857	Delhi, India
	Edward Thackeray	Bengal Sappers and Miners	16 September 1857	Delhi, India
	Jacob Thomas	Bengal Artillery	27 September 1857	Lucknow, India
	Alexander Thompson	42nd Regiment of Foot	15 April 1858	Fort Ruhya, India
	William Thompson	60th Rifles	9 July 1857	Delhi, India
	Henry Tombs	Bengal Horse Artillery	9 July 1857	Delhi, India
	James Travers	2nd Bengal Native Infantry	July 1857	Indore, India
	Samuel Turner	60th Rifles	19 June 1857	Delhi, India
	John Tytler	66th Bengal Native Infantry	10 February 1858	Choorpoorah, India
	Richard Wadeson	75th Regiment of Foot	17 July 1857	Delhi, India
	George Waller	60th Rifles	14 September 1857, 18 September 1857	Delhi, India
	William Waller	25th Bombay Light Infantry	20 June 1858	Gwalior, India
	Henry Ward	78th Regiment of Foot	25 September 1857	Lucknow, India
	Joseph Ward	8th King's Royal Irish Hussars	17 June 1858	Gwalior, India
	John Watson	1st Punjab Cavalry	14 November 1857	Lucknow, India
	Frederick Whirlpool	3rd Bombay European Regiment	3 April 1858, 2 May 1858	Jhansi, India; Lohari, India
	Henry Wilmot	Rifle Brigade	11 March 1858	Lucknow, India
	Evelyn Wood	17th Lancers	19 October 1858	Sinwaho, India
	Thomas Young	Naval Brigade	16 November 1857	Lucknow, India
