= List of cavalry recipients of the Victoria Cross =

The Victoria Cross

The Victoria Cross (VC) is a military decoration that may be bestowed upon members of the British or Commonwealth armed forces for acts of valour or gallantry performed in the face of the enemy. Within the British honours system and those of many Commonwealth nations it is the highest award a soldier can receive for actions in combat. It was established in 1856 and since then has been awarded 1,356 times, including three service personnel who were awarded the VC twice.

The VC was introduced on 29 January 1856 by Queen Victoria to reward acts of valour during the Crimean War. The traditional explanation of the source of the gunmetal from which the medals are struck is that it derives from Russian cannon captured at the siege of Sevastopol. Recent research has thrown doubt on this story, suggesting a variety of origins. The original Royal Warrant did not contain a specific clause regarding posthumous awards, although official policy was to not award the VC posthumously. Between 1897 and 1901, several notices were issued in The London Gazette regarding soldiers who would have been awarded the VC had they survived. In a partial reversal of policy in 1902, six of the soldiers mentioned were granted the VC, but not "officially" awarded the medal. In 1907, the posthumous policy was completely reversed and medals were sent to the next of kin of the six officers and men. The Victoria Cross warrant was not officially amended to explicitly allow posthumous awards until 1920 but one quarter of all awards for the First World War were posthumous.

Due to its rarity, the VC is highly prized and the medal has fetched over £400,000 at auction. A number of public and private collections are devoted to the Victoria Cross. The private collection of Lord Ashcroft, amassed since 1986, contains over one-tenth of all VCs awarded. Following a 2008 donation to the Imperial War Museum, the Ashcroft collection went on public display alongside the museum's Victoria and George Cross collection in November 2010. Since 1990, three Commonwealth countries that retain the Queen as head of state have instituted their own versions of the VC. As a result, the original Victoria Cross is sometimes referred to as the "Commonwealth Victoria Cross" or the "Imperial Victoria Cross", to distinguish it from the newer awards.

The first awards to cavalrymen were the nine awarded during the Crimean War, the first seven in the Charge of the Light Brigade 25 October 1854. The largest number for any one campaign was the twenty-nine awarded during the Indian Mutiny (also known as the Indian Rebellion of 1857), twelve of those to one regiment, the 9th Queen's Royal Lancers. All together ninety-two awards have been made to cavalrymen, the last on 23 September 1918 in the final days of World War I.

== Cavalry recipients ==
| Name | Regiment | Date | Conflict | Location |
|---|---|---|---|---|
| Herman Albrecht | Imperial Light Horse | 6 January 1900 | Second Boer War | Ladysmith |
| Charles Anderson | 2nd Dragoon Guards (Queen's Bays) | 8 October 1858 | Indian Mutiny | Sundeela Oudh |
| William Bankes | 7th (The Queen's Own) Light Dragoons | 19 March 1858 | Indian Mutiny | Lucknow |
| William Beresford | 9th (Queen's Royal) Lancers | 3 July 1879 | Anglo-Zulu War | White Umfolozi River |
| John Berryman | 17th (Duke of Cambridge's Own) Lancers | 25 October 1854 | Crimean War | Balaclava |
| James Blair | 2nd Bombay Light Cavalry | 12 August 1857; 23 October 1857 | Indian Mutiny | Neemuch; Jeerum |
| Robert Blair | 2nd Dragoon Guards (Queen's Bays) | 28 September 1857 | Indian Mutiny | Bolandshahr |
| Edward Brown | 14th (King's) Hussars | 13 October 1900 | Second Boer War | Geluk |
| Sam Browne | 2nd Punjab Irregular Cavalry | 31 August 1858 | Indian Mutiny | Seerporah |
| Thomas Byrne | 21st (Empress of India's) Lancers | 2 September 1898 | Mahdist War | Omdurman |
| Adrian Carton de Wiart | 4th (Royal Irish) Dragoon Guards | 2–3 July 1916 | First World War | La Boiselle |
| James Champion | 8th (The King's Royal Irish) Light Dragoons | 8 September 1858 | Indian Mutiny | Beejapore |
| George Clare | 5th (Royal Irish) Lancers | 28–29 November 1917 | First World War | Bourlon Wood |
| John Clements | Rimington's Guides | 24 February 1901 | Second Boer War | Strijdenburg |
| Hampden Cockburn | Royal Canadian Dragoons | 7 November 1900 | Second Boer War | Komati River |
| Harry Crandon | 18th Hussars | 4 July 1901 | Second Boer War | Springbok Laagte |
| Thomas Crean | Imperial Light Horse | 18 December 1901 | Second Boer War | Tygerkloof Spruit |
| John Danaher | Nourse's Horse (Transvaal) | 16 January 1881 | First Boer War | Elandsfontein |
| Henry D'Arcy | Frontier Light Horse | 3 July 1879 | Anglo-Zulu War | White Umfolozi River |
| Patrick Donohoe | 9th (Queen's Royal) Lancers | 28 September 1857 | Indian Mutiny | Bolandshahr |
| John Doogan | 1st (King's) Dragoon Guards | 28 January 1881 | First Boer War | Laing's Nek |
| Alexis Doxat | Imperial Yeomanry | 20 October 1900 | Second Boer War | Zeerust |
| Frederic Dugdale | 5th (Royal Irish) Lancers | 3 March 1901 | Second Boer War | Derby |
| Alexander Dunn | 11th (Prince Albert's Own) Hussars | 25 October 1854 | Crimean War | Balaclava |
| John Dunville | 1st (Royal) Dragoons | 24–25 June 1917 | First World War | Epehy |
| Henry Engleheart | 10th (The Prince of Wales's Own) Royal Hussars | 13 March 1900 | Second Boer War | Bloemfontein |
| William English | Scottish Horse | 3 July 1901 | Second Boer War | Vlakfontein |
| John Farrell | 17th (Duke of Cambridge's Own) Lancers | 25 October 1854 | Crimean War | Balaclava |
| Gordon Flowerdew | Lord Strathcona's Horse (Royal Canadians) | 31 March 1918 | First World War | Bois de Moreuil |
| Charles Fraser | 7th (The Queen's Own) Light Dragoons | 31 December 1858 | Indian Mutiny | River Raptee |
| John Freeman | 9th (Queen's Royal) Lancers | 10 October 1857 | Indian Mutiny | Agra |
| Charles Garforth | 15th (The King's) Hussars | 23 August 1914 | First World War | Harmingnies |
| Francis Grenfell | 9th (Queen's Royal) Lancers | 24 August 1914 | First World War | Audregnies |
| John Grieve | 2nd Dragoons (Royal Scots Greys) | 25 October 1854 | Crimean War | Balaclava |
| William Goat | 9th (Queen's Royal) Lancers | 6 March 1858 | Indian Mutiny | Lucknow |
| Charles Gough | 5th Bengal European Cavalry | 15 August 1857, 18 August 1857, 27 January 1858, 3 February 1858 | Indian Mutiny | Khurkowdah; Not known Shumshabad; Meangunge |
| Hugh Gough | 1st Bengal European Light Cavalry | 12 November 1857, 25 February 1858 | Indian Mutiny | Alumbagh; Jellalabad |
| Walter Hamilton | Guides Cavalry | 2 April 1879 | Second Afghan War | Futtehabad |
| Thomas Hancock | 9th (Queen's Royal) Lancers | 19 June 1857 | Indian Mutiny | Delhi |
| Henry Hartigan | 9th (Queen's Royal) Lancers | 8 June 1857; 10 October 1857 | Indian Mutiny | Delhi; Agra |
| Frederick Harvey | Lord Strathcona's Horse (Royal Canadians) | 27 March 1917 | First World War | Guyencourt |
| Herbert Henderson | Rhodesia Horse | 30 March 1896 | Second Matabele War | Bulawayo |
| Clement Heneage | 8th (The King's Royal Irish) Light Dragoons | 17 June 1858 | Indian Mutiny | Gwalior |
| Edward Holland | Royal Canadian Dragoons | 7 November 1900 | Second Boer War | Komati River |
| George Hollis | 8th (The King's Royal Irish) Light Dragoons | 17 June 1858 | Indian Mutiny | Gwalior |
| Charles Hull | 21st (Empress of India's) Lancers | 5 September 1915 | First World War | Hafiz Kor |
| Robert Johnston | Imperial Light Horse | 21 October 1899 | Second Boer War | Elandslaagte |
| Alfred Jones | 9th (Queen's Royal) Lancers | 8 June 1857 | Indian Mutiny | Delhi |
| Robert Kells | 9th (Queen's Royal) Lancers | 28 September 1857 | Indian Mutiny | Bolandshahr |
| Paul Kenna | 21st (Empress of India's) Lancers | 2 September 1898 | Mahdist War | Omdurman |
| Alexander Lafone | 1st County of London Yeomanry | 27 October 1917 | First World War | El Buggar Ridge |
| Brian Lawrence | 17th (The Duke of Cambridge's Own) Lancers | 7 August 1900 | Second Boer War | Essenbosch Farm |
| James Leith | 14th Light Dragoons | 1 April 1858 | Indian Mutiny | Betwa |
| John Malcolmson | 3rd Bombay Light Cavalry | 8 February 1857 | Anglo-Persian War | Khoosh-ab |
| Joseph Malone | 13th Light Dragoons | 25 October 1854 | Crimean War | Balaclava |
| William Marshall | 19th (Alexandra Princess of Wales's Own) Hussars | 29 February 1884 | Mahdist War | El Teb |
| Francis Maxwell | Robert's Light Horse | 31 March 1900 | Second Boer War | Korn Spruit |
| John Milbanke | 10th (The Prince of Wales's Own) Royal Hussars | 5 January 1900 | Second Boer War | Colesberg |
| Thomas Monaghan | 2nd Dragoon Guards (Queen's Bays) | 8 October 1858 | Indian Mutiny | Jamo |
| Raymond de Montmorency | 21st (Empress of India's) Lancers | 2 September 1898 | Mahdist War | Omdurman |
| Arthur Moore | 3rd Bombay Light Cavalry | 8 February 1857 | Anglo-Persian War | Khoosh-ab |
| James Mouat | 6th (Inniskilling) Dragoons | 26 October 1854 | Crimean War | Balaclava |
| Charles Mullins | Imperial Light Horse | 21 October 1899 | Second Boer War | Elandslaagte |
| Alexander Murray | 16th (The Queen's) Lancers | 17 August 1897 | Tirah Campaign | Nawa Kili |
| Robert Newell | 9th (Queen's Royal) Lancers | 19 March 1858 | Indian Mutiny | Lucknow |
| John Norwood | 5th (Princess Charlotte of Wales's) Dragoon Guards | 30 October 1899 | Second Boer War | Ladysmith |
| Edmund O'Toole | Frontier Light Horse | 3 July 1879 | Anglo-Zulu War | White Umfolozi River |
| Samuel Parkes | 4th Light Dragoons | 25 October 1854 | Crimean War | Balaclava |
| Frank de Pass | 34th Prince Albert Victor's Own Poona Horse | 24 November 1914 | First World War | Festubert |
| John Pearson | 8th (The King's Royal Irish) Light Dragoons | 17 June 1858 | Indian Mutiny | Gwalior |
| Frederick Potts | Berkshire Yeomanry | 21 August 1915 | First World War | Gallipoli |
| Dighton Probyn | 2nd Punjab Cavalry | 1857 to 1858 | Indian Mutiny | Agra |
| John Purcell | 9th (Queen's Royal) Lancers | 19 June 1857 | Indian Mutiny | Delhi |
| Henry Ramage | 2nd Dragoons (Royal Scots Greys) | 25 October 1854 | Crimean War | Balaclava |
| Arthur Richardson | Lord Strathcona's Horse (Royal Canadians) | 5 July 1900 | Second Boer War | Wolwespruit |
| James Roberts | 9th (Queen's Royal) Lancers | 28 September 1857 | Indian Mutiny | Bolandshahr |
| David Rushe | 9th (Queen's Royal) Lancers | 19 March 1858 | Indian Mutiny | Lucknow |
| Reginald Sartorius | 6th Bengal Cavalry | 17 January 1874 | Third Ashanti War | Abogu |
| Badlu Singh | 14th Murray's Jat Lancers | 23 September 1918 | First World War | River Jordan |
| Gobind Singh | 28th Light Cavalry | 30 November 1917; 1 December 1917 | First World War | Pezières |
| Nevill Smyth | 2nd Dragoon Guards (Queen's Bays) | 2 September 1898 | Mahdist War | Omdurman |
| David Spence | 9th (Queen's Royal) Lancers | 17 January 1858 | Indian Mutiny | Shunsabad |
| Harcus Strachan | Fort Garry Horse | 20 November 1917 | First World War | Masnieres |
| Richard Turner | Royal Canadian Dragoons | 7 November 1900 | Second Boer War | Komati River |
| William Vousden | 5th Punjab Cavalry | 14 December 1879 | Second Afghan War | Asmai Heights |
| Joseph Ward | 8th (The King's Royal Irish) Light Dragoons | 17 June 1858 | Indian Mutiny | Gwalior |
| John Watson | 1st Punjab Cavalry | 14 November 1857 | Indian Mutiny | Lucknow |
| George Wheeler | 7th Hariana Lancers | 12–13 April 1915 | First World War | Shaiba |
| Richard West | North Irish Horse | 2 September 1918 | First World War | Courcelles-le-Comte |
| Frederick Whirlpool | 1st Punjab Cavalry | 3 April 1858, 2 May 1858 | Indian Mutiny | Jhansi; Lohari |
| Evelyn Wood | 17th (Duke of Cambridge's Own) Lancers | 19 October 1858 | Indian Mutiny | Sinwaho |
| Charles Wooden | 17th (Duke of Cambridge's Own) Lancers | 26 October 1854 | Crimean War | Balaclava |
