= Goate =

Goate is a surname. Notable people with the surname include:

- Alison Goate, British neuroscientist
- William Goate (1836–1901), English Victoria Cross recipient
