= John Jones (archdeacon of Liverpool) =

Archdeacon of Liverpool

John Jones (1791–1889) was the second Archdeacon of Liverpool, serving from 1855 until 1886.

Jones was born on 5 October 1791 and educated at St John's College, Cambridge. He was ordained deacon on 19 February 1815, and priest on 24 December, the same year. After a curacy at St Mary, Leicester he was Vicar of St Andrew, Liverpool until 1880 and then Christ Church, Waterloo until 1889.

He died on 5 December 1889.

Among his children were:

- Rev. W. Henry Jones (c.1820–1903), educated at Brasenose College, Oxford, who served as vicar of Mottram in Longdendale, then as rector of Godington.
- Lieutenant-Colonel Alfred Stowell Jones (1832–1920), who won the VC while serving as a 25 years old lieutenant in the 9th Lancers during the Indian Mutiny.
