= Lambeth Cemetery =

Cemetery in Tooting, London

Coordinates: 51°25′40″N 0°10′52″W

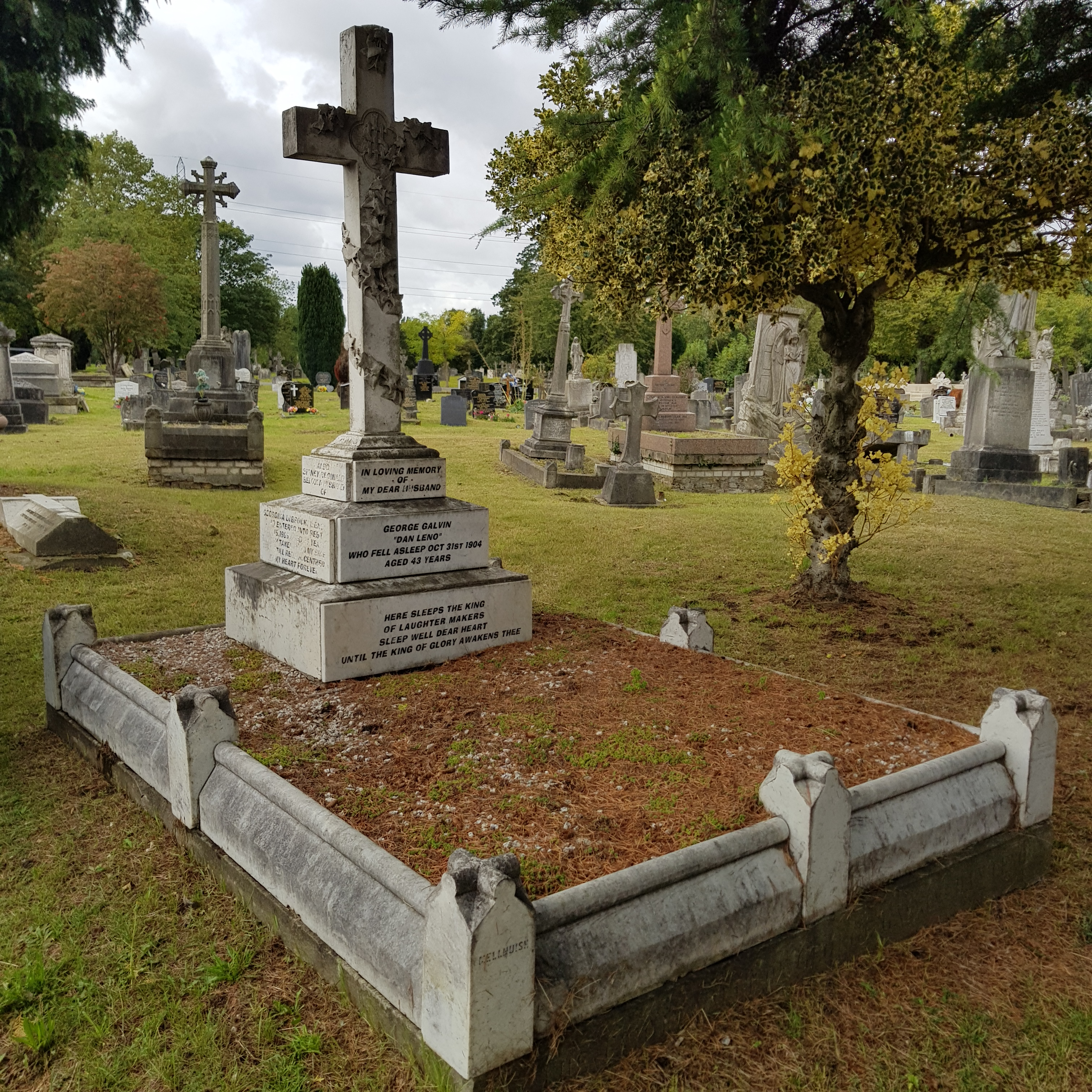
Memorial for the Victorian actor Dan Leno who is buried at Lambeth Cemetery

Lambeth Cemetery is a cemetery in Tooting, in the London Borough of Wandsworth. It is one of three cemeteries owned by Lambeth London Borough Council, the others being West Norwood Cemetery and Streatham Cemetery.

== History ==
Like nearby Streatham Cemetery, Lambeth Cemetery was developed by a parish burial board in 1854 following the Metropolitan Burial Act 1852, which was a response to the second cholera epidemic of 1848–49.

The cemetery is laid out as a rectangular grid of paths, has a few trees and is sited just east of the River Wandle in what was countryside in the 1850s and was largely to remain so for some decades. There are two lodges beside the main gate in Blackshaw Road and a memorial chapel, all built in brick in a Gothic style and designed by F. K. Wehnert and J. Ashdown. The cemetery was extended to the south in 1874 when Robert Taylor was chairman of Lambeth Burial Board, and Hugh Mcintosh was the surveyor who laid out the extension. There is a crematorium and Garden of Remembrance opened in May 1969 in 10 acres (40,000 m^{2}) of gardens at the northern end.

Another noteworthy feature is the screen wall memorial, in the south-west corner of the cemetery, unveiled in 1953 for both First and Second World War Commonwealth service personnel whose graves could not be marked by CWGC headstones. There are 217 Commonwealth war graves from the First and 145 from the Second World War, besides one Belgian war grave and 29 British non-world-war service graves.

== Interments and current use ==
Lambeth Cemetery is said to contain 250,000 burials and was associated with Victorian music hall artists, including the comedians Dan Leno, Stanley Lupino and Charles Chaplin Sr. Robert Kells and David Spence, both Victoria Cross recipients from the Indian Mutiny who ultimately became Yeomen of the Guard, are buried here, though in unmarked graves.

Between 1969 and 1991 it was subject to "lawn conversion", and today has a layout of straight paths dotted with trees. The cemetery features predominantly modern, late-20th-century gravestones, many of which have been staked to stop them falling over, with occasional 19th-century gravestones and monuments. The cemetery is visited by green woodpeckers and sparrowhawks and the site is predominantly neutral grassland. The Garden of Remembrance near the Crematorium is maintained as mown grass parkland.
