= Same Shaw =

Recipient of the Victoria Cross

Same (John) Shaw
- Born: Prestonpans, East Lothian
- Died: 27 December 1859
- Burial place: Buried at sea
- Military career
- Allegiance: United Kingdom
- Branch: British Army
- Rank: Corporal
- Units: The Rifle Brigade
- Conflicts: Crimean War; Indian Mutiny
- Awards: Victoria Cross

Same (John) Shaw VC (Unknown – 27 December 1859) was a Scottish recipient of the Victoria Cross, the highest and most prestigious award for gallantry in the face of the enemy that can be awarded to British and Commonwealth forces.

== Details ==
Shaw was a private in the 3rd Battalion, The Rifle Brigade (Prince Consort's Own), British Army during the Indian Mutiny when the following deed took place on 13 June 1858 at Lucknow, India for which he was awarded the VC:

Rifle Brigade (3rd Battalion)

Private Same Shaw
Date-of Act of Bravery, 13th June, 1858.
For the Act of Bravery recorded in a despatch from Major-General James Hope Grant, K.C.B., Commanding the Lucknow Field Force, to the Deputy Adjutant-General of the Army, of which the following is an extract:
"Nowabegunge, 17th June, 1858. "I have to bring to notice the conduct of Private Same Shaw, of the 3rd Battalion, Rifle Brigade, who is recommended by his Commanding Officer for the Victoria Cross, An armed rebel had been seen to enter a tope of trees. Some officers and men ran into the tope in pursuit of him. This man was a Ghazee. Private Shaw drew his short sword, and with that weapon rushed single-handed on the Ghazee. Shaw received a severe tulwar wound, but after a desperate struggle, he killed the man."

" I trust his Excellency will allow me to recommend this man for the Victoria Cross, and that he will approve of my having issued a Division Order, stating that I have done so."

He later achieved the rank of corporal.

== The medal ==
His Victoria Cross is displayed at the Royal Green Jackets (Rifles) Museum, Winchester, England.
