= Thomas Monaghan (VC) =

Recipient of the Victoria Cross

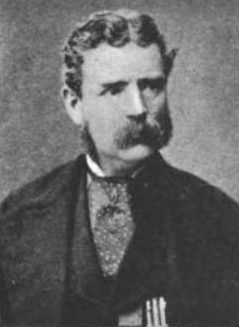
- Born: 18 April 1833; Abergavenny, Monmouthshire
- Died: 10 November 1895 (aged 62); Woolwich, London
- Burial place: Woolwich cemetery
- Military career
- Allegiance: United Kingdom
- Branch: British Army
- Rank: Sergeant-Trumpeter
- Units: 2nd Queen's Dragoon Guards
- Conflicts: Indian Mutiny
- Awards: Victoria Cross

Thomas Monaghan VC (Irish: Tomás Ó Manacháin; 18 April 1833 – 10 November 1895) was a British recipient of the Victoria Cross, the highest and most prestigious award for gallantry in the face of the enemy that can be awarded to British and Commonwealth forces, during the Indian Mutiny

== Biography ==
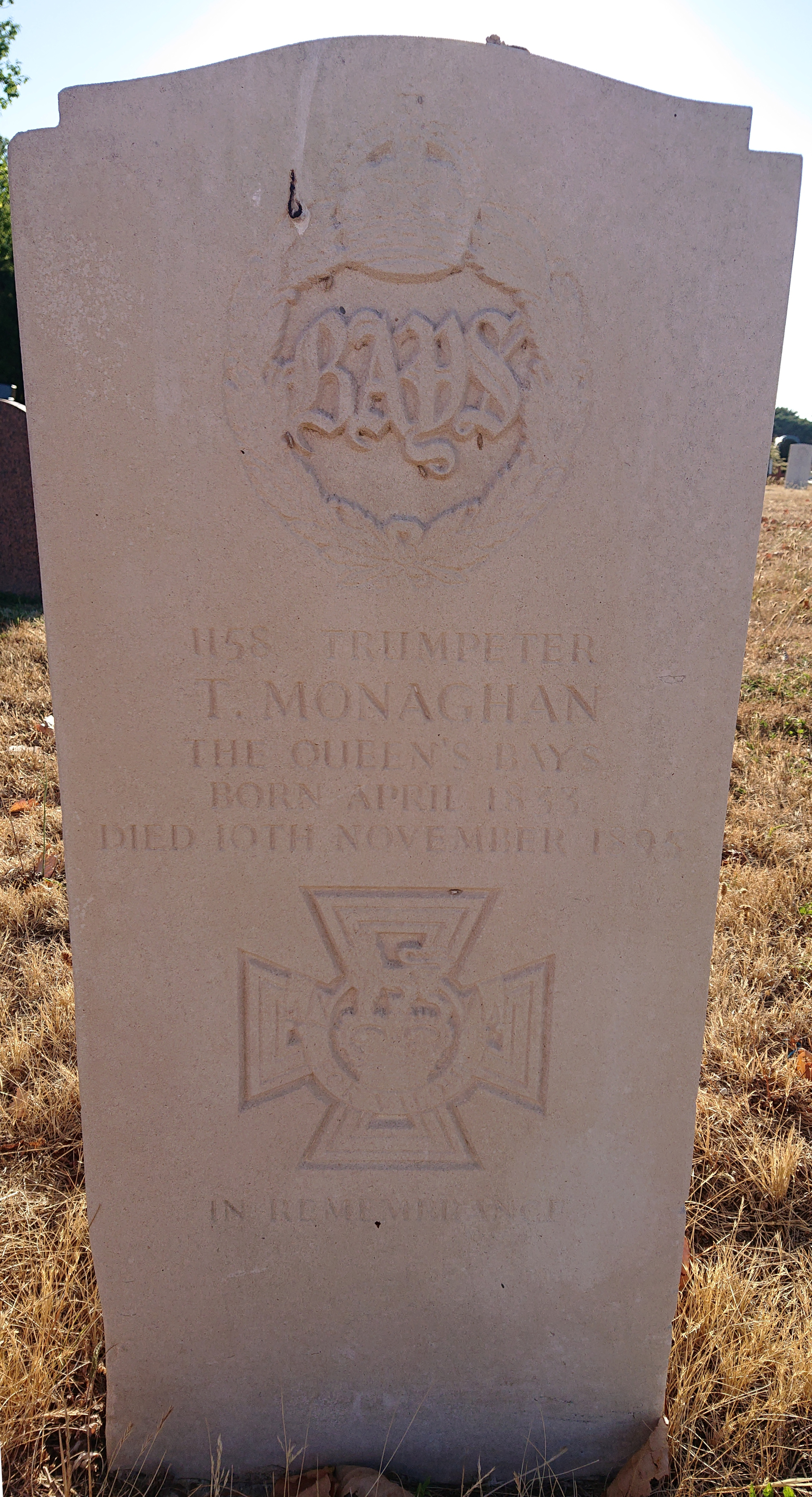
Monaghan's grave at Woolwich Cemetery

Monaghan was born at Abergavenny, Monmouthshire. At 25 years of age, Monaghan was a trumpeter in the 2nd Dragoon Guards (Queen's Bays), British Army during the Indian Mutiny

No. 1158. Trumpeter Thomas Monaghan, Date of Acts of Bravery, October 8th, 1858
For saving the life of Lieutenant-Colonel Seymour, C.B., commanding the regiment, in an attack made on him on the 8th of October, 1858, by mutinous sepoys, in a dense jungle of sugar canes, from which an attempt was made to dislodge them. The mutineers were between 30 and 40 in number. They suddenly opened fire on Lieutenant-Colonel Seymour and his party at a few yards distance, and immediately afterwards rushed in upon them with drawn (native) swords. Pistolling a man, cutting at him, and emptying with deadly effect at arm's length every barrel of his revolver, Lieutenant-Colonel Seymour was cut down by two sword cuts, when the two men above recommended, rushed to his rescue, and the Trumpeter shooting a man with his pistol in the act of cutting at him, and both Trumpeter and Dragoon driving at the enemy with their swords, enabled him to arise, and assist in defending himself again, when the whole of the enemy were dispatched. The occurrence took place soon after the action fought near Sundeela, Oudh, on the date abovementioned.

Monaghan and the Dragoon (Charles Anderson) were both awarded the Victoria Cross for their bravery. Monaghan eventually achieved the rank of sergeant-trumpeter. His grave is at Woolwich cemetery, London and his Victoria Cross is displayed at the Queen's Dragoon Guards Regimental Museum at Cardiff Castle, Wales.
