= Hanson Jarrett =

Hanson Chambers Taylor Jarrett VC
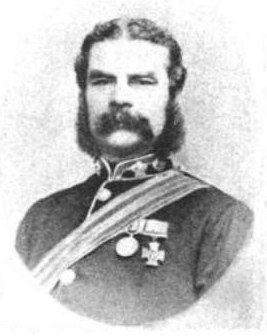
- Born: 22 March 1839; Madras, British India
- Died: 11 April 1891 (aged 52); Saugor, British India
- Burial place: Saugor New Cemetery
- Military career
- Allegiance: United Kingdom
- Branch: Bombay Army; British Indian Army
- Rank: Colonel
- Conflicts: Indian Mutiny
- Awards: Victoria Cross

Colonel Hanson Chambers Taylor Jarrett VC (22 March 1839 – 11 April 1891) was a recipient of the Victoria Cross, the highest and most prestigious award for gallantry in the face of the enemy that can be awarded to British and Commonwealth forces.

== Details ==
He was 21 years old, and a lieutenant in the 26th Bengal Native Infantry, Bengal Army during the Indian Mutiny when the following deed took place on 14 October 1858 at Baroun, India, for which he was awarded the VC.

26th Bengal Native Infantry.

Lieutenant Hanson Chambers Taylor Jarrett, Date of Act of Bravery, 14th October, 1858

For an act of daring bravery at the village of Baroun, on the 14th of October, 1858, on an occasion when about 70 Sepoys were defending themselves in a brick building, the only approach to which was up a very narrow street, in having called on the men of his regiment to follow him, when, backed by only some four men, he made a dash at the narrow entrance, where, though a shower of balls was poured upon him, he pushed his way up to the wall of the house, and beating up the bayonets of the rebels with his sword, endeavoured to get in.
