= John Purcell (VC) =

British Indian army soldier

- Born: c. 1814; Kilcommon, County Galway
- Died: 19 September 1857 (aged 42-43); Delhi, British India
- Burial place: Delhi Old Military Cemetery
- Military career
- Allegiance: United Kingdom
- Branch: British Army
- Rank: Private
- Unit: 9th Lancers
- Conflicts: Indian Mutiny
- Awards: Victoria Cross

John Purcell VC (c. 1814 – 19 September 1857) was an Irish soldier in the British Army who received the Victoria Cross, the highest and most prestigious award for gallantry in the face of the enemy that can be awarded to British and Commonwealth forces.

He was born at Kilcommon, Oughterard, County Galway.

== Details ==
He was about 43 years old, and a private in the 9th Lancers (The Queen's Royal), during the Indian Mutiny when the following deed took place on 19 June 1857 at Delhi, India for which he and Thomas Hancock were awarded the VC:

9th Lancers. Privates Thomas Hancock and John Purcell

"The guns, I am happy to say, were saved, but a waggon of Major Scott's battery was blown up. I must not fail to mention the excellent conduct of a Sowar of the 4th Irregular Cavalry, and two men of the 9th Lancers, Privates Thomas Hancock and John Purcell, who, when my horse was shot down, remained by me throughout. One of these men and the Sowar offered me their horses, and I was dragged out by the Sowar's horse. Private Hancock was severely wounded, and Private Purcell's horse was killed under him. The Sowar's name is Roopur Khan."

Extract of a letter from Brigadier J. H. Grant, C.B., Commanding Cavalry Brigade of the Field Force, to the Deputy Assistant-Adjutant General of Division. Dated Camp, Delhi, 22 June 1857.

In a later dispatch from Brigadier-General Hope Grant, C.B. to Major H. W. Norman, Assistant Adjutant-General of the Army, on 10 January 1858, Hope writes:

I had the sincere gratification of naming two privates of the 9th Lancers, who had displayed signal gallantry in the fight—Privates Thomas Hancock, who lost an arm on the occasion, and John Purcell, who had his horse shot under him, and was, I regret to say, afterwards killed at the assault of Delhi. Sir Henry Barnard was pleased to recommend that the Victoria Cross should be conferred on both.

He was killed in action at Delhi a few weeks later, on 19 September 1857.
