= Sherpura =

- town
- Location in Rajasthan, India Sherpura (India)
- Coordinates: 29°10′24″N 73°03′40″E
- Country: India
- State: Rajasthan

Languages
  - Official: Hindi
- Time zone: UTC+5:30 (IST)

Sherpura, also known as Poharwala, is a town in Sri Ganganagar district Rajasthan, India.
