= Robert Newell (VC) =

- Born: 1822; Seaham, County Durham
- Died: 11 July 1858 (aged 35–36); Umballa, British India
- Burial place: Umballa Cemetery
- Military career
- Allegiance: United Kingdom
- Branch: British Army
- Rank: Private
- Units: 9th Lancers
- Conflicts: Indian Mutiny
- Awards: Victoria Cross

Robert Newell VC (1822 – 11 July 1858) was an English recipient of the Victoria Cross, the highest and most prestigious award for gallantry in the face of the enemy that can be awarded to British and Commonwealth forces.

Private Newell was approximately 36 years old, and a private in the 9th Lancers of the British Army when the following deed on 19 March 1858, during the Indian Mutiny at Lucknow, India led to the award of the Victoria Cross:

Private R. Newell. Date of Act of Bravery, 19th March, 1858

For conspicuous gallantry at Lucknow, on the 19th of March, 1858, in going to the assistance of a comrade whose horse had fallen on bad ground, and bringing him away, under a heavy fire of musketry from a large body of the enemy.

Despatch from Major-General Sir James Hope Grant, K.C.B., dated 8th April, 1858.

He died four months later from severe diarrhoea in Ambala, India on 11 July 1858, aged 36. His VC is on display in the Lord Ashcroft Gallery at the Imperial War Museum, London.
