= Trumpet major =

Appointment in the British Army

Trumpet major is an appointment in British Army cavalry regiments or the Royal Horse Artillery, held by a sergeant (or corporal of horse in the Household Cavalry) or a staff sergeant (or staff corporal in the Household Cavalry) or warrant officer class 2. His job is to supervise the training and deployment of trumpeters who blow daily duty and ceremonial calls. Trumpet majors were first appointed to the establishment in 1811.

The trumpet was originally a signalling instrument, but it has become purely ceremonial since the invention of radio.

The insignia of appointment is four point-up chevrons worn on a wrist-strap whilst in shirt-sleeve order, or four large point-up chevrons worn on the uniform sleeve, surmounted by crossed trumpets. Staff sergeants (or staff corporals) have a small crown above the trumpets and warrant officers class 2 have a larger crown.
