= David Rushe =

Recipient of the Victoria Cross

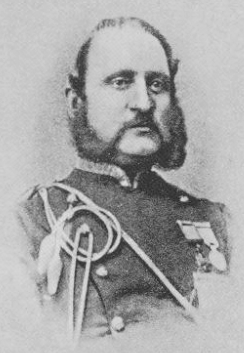
- Born: 28 April 1827; Woburn, Bedfordshire
- Died: 6 November 1886 (aged 59); Great Marlow, Buckinghamshire
- Burial place: Marlow Parish Churchyard
- Military career
- Allegiance: United Kingdom
- Branch: British Army
- Rank: Regimental Sergeant-Major
- Units: 9th Lancers
- Conflicts: Indian Mutiny
- Awards: Victoria Cross

David Rushe VC (28 April 1827 – 6 November 1886) was an English recipient of the Victoria Cross.

== Details ==
Rushe was 30 years old, and a troop sergeant-major in the 9th Lancers (The Queen's Royal), British Army during the Indian Mutiny when the following deed took place for which he was awarded the VC:

For conspicuous bravery, near Lucknow, on the 19th of March, 1858, in having, in company with one other private of the troop, attacked eight of the enemy, who had posted themselves in a nullah, and killed three of them. Despatch from Major-General Sir James Hope Grant, K.C.B., dated 8th April, 1858.

Rushe received his Victoria Cross from Queen Victoria at Windsor Castle on 4 January 1860. This joined his medals for the 1st and 2nd Sikh Wars and the Indian Mutiny. He also received the Good Conduct Medal and the Long Service Medal.

== Further information ==
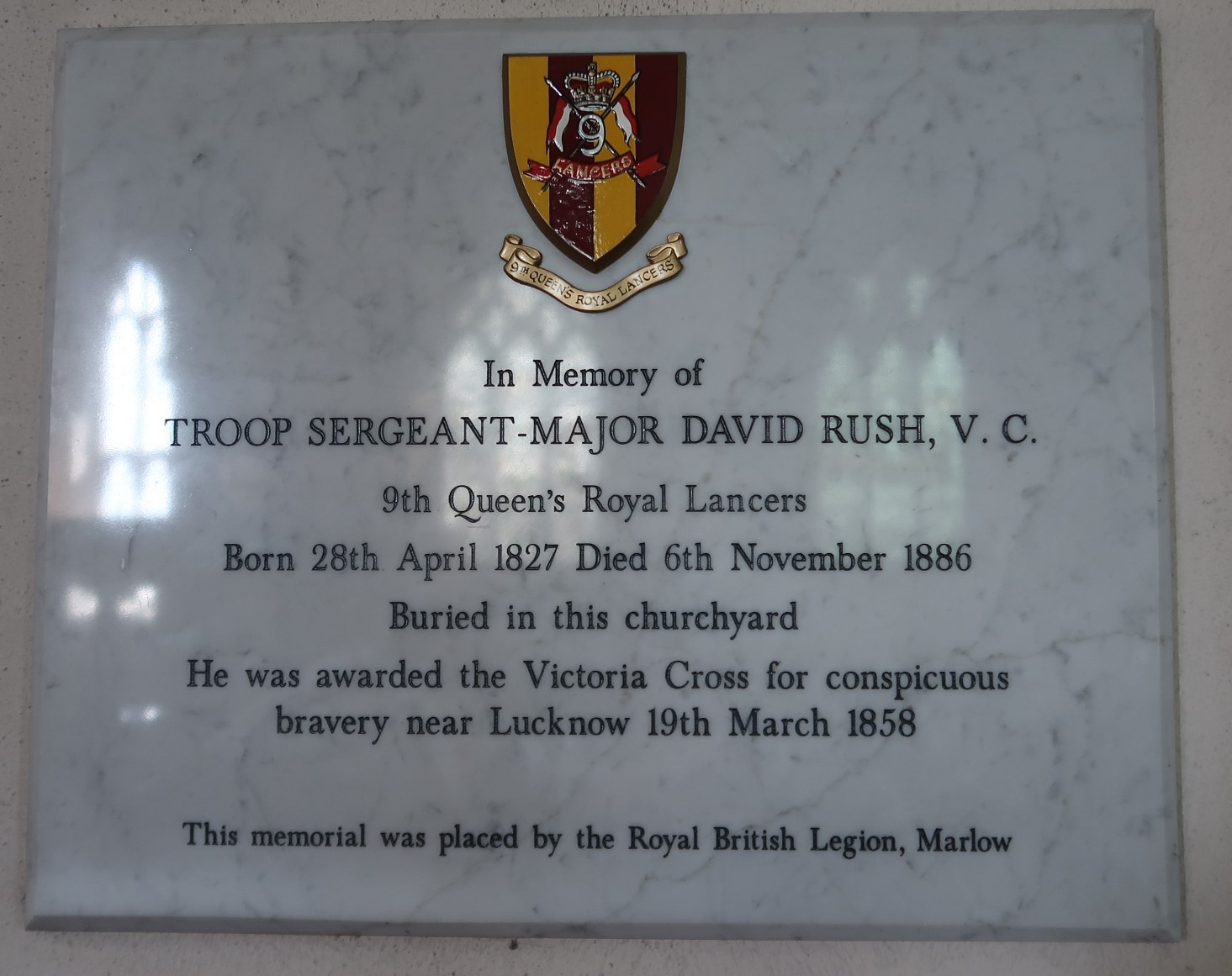
Troop Sergeant-Major David Rush VC - Wall plaque in All Saints Church, Marlow

He later achieved the rank of regimental sergeant-major. Rushe died on 6 November 1886 at Great Marlow and was buried without a stone at All Saints Church, Marlow. His widow sold the medal, but his descendants re-purchased the medal in 1959 and later lent in to be displayed at his regimental museum within Derby Museum.
