= Trumpeter (rank) =

A Trumpeter (abbreviation: Tptr) is a regiment specific, descriptive name given to Privates in the British Army. It is used for trumpeters in the Household Cavalry and was formerly used in all other cavalry regiments. Trumpeters are overseen by a Trumpet major, who coordinate and lead other trumpeters in events.

== See also ==
- Private - United Kingdom for other specific names given to Privates
- Trumpet major
