= Thomas Hancock (VC) =

English recipient of the Victoria Cross

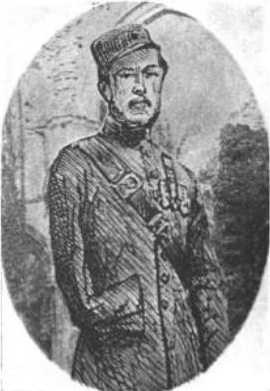
- Born: July 1823; Kensington, London, England
- Died: 12 March 1871 (aged 47); Westminster Workhouse, England
- Burial place: Brompton Cemetery
- Military career
- Allegiance: United Kingdom
- Branch: British Army
- Rank: Corporal
- Units: 9th Lancers
- Conflicts: Indian Mutiny
- Awards: Victoria Cross

Thomas Hancock VC (July 1823 – 12 March 1871) was an English recipient of the Victoria Cross, the highest and most prestigious award for gallantry in the face of the enemy that can be awarded to British and Commonwealth forces.

== Details ==
He was about 33 years old, and a private in the 9th Lancers (The Queen's Royal), British Army during the Indian Mutiny when the following deed took place on 19 June 1857 at Delhi, India for which he and John Purcell were awarded the VC:

9th Lancers. Privates Thomas Hancock and John Purcell

"The guns, I am happy to say,. were saved, but a waggon of Major Scott's battery was blown up. I must not fail to mention the excellent conduct of a Sowar of the 4th Irregular Cavalry, and two men of the 9th Lancers, Privates Thomas Hancock and John Purcell, who, when my horse was shot down, remained by me throughout. One of these men and the Sowar offered me their horses, and I was dragged out by the Sowar's horse. Private Hancock was severely wounded, and Private Purcell's horse was killed under him. The Sowar's name is Roopur Khan."

Extract of a letter from Brigadier J. H. Grant, C.B., Commanding Cavalry Brigade of the Field Force, to the Deputy Assistant-Adjutant General of Division. Dated Camp, Delhi, 22 June 1857.

In a later dispatch from Brigadier-General Hope Grant, C.B. to Major H. W. Norman, Assistant Adjutant-General of the Army, on 10 January 1858, Hope writes:

I had the sincere gratification of naming two privates of the 9th Lancers, who had displayed signal gallantry in the fight – Privates Thomas Hancock, who lost an arm on the occasion, and John Purcell, who had his horse shot under him, and was, I regret to say, afterwards killed at the assault of Delhi. Sir Henry Barnard was pleased to recommend that the Victoria Cross should be conferred on both.

He later achieved the rank of corporal. He died in Westminster Workhouse, 12 March 1871, and was buried in a common (unmarked) grave in Brompton Cemetery. A memorial stone was subsequently placed over the burial plot on 15 October 2011.
