= John Freeman (VC) =

English recipient of the Victoria Cross

- Born: 1833; Sittingbourne, Kent
- Died: 1 July 1913 (aged 79–80); Hackney, London
- Burial place: Abney Park Cemetery, Stoke Newington
- Military career
- Allegiance: United Kingdom
- Branch: British Army
- Rank: Private
- Units: 9th Lancers
- Conflicts: Indian Mutiny
- Awards: Victoria Cross

John Freeman VC (1833 – 1 July 1913) was an English recipient of the Victoria Cross, the highest and most prestigious award for gallantry in the face of the enemy that can be awarded to British and Commonwealth forces.

== Background ==
John Freeman was born in Sittingbourne, Kent in 1833. He died in Hackney, east London on 1 July 1913 and was buried in Abney Park Cemetery, Stoke Newington.

== Military career ==
Freeman was approximately 25 years old, and a private in the 9th Lancers (The Queen's Royal) Regiment, British Army during the Indian Mutiny when he was awarded the VC for an act of conspicuous bravery at Agra.

The despatch from Major-General Sir James Hope Grant, KCB, dated 8 April 1858 reads:

"For conspicuous gallantry on the 10th of October, 1857, at Agra, in having gone to the assistance of Lieutenant Jones, who had been shot, killing the leader of the enemy's cavalry, and defending Lieutenant Jones against several of the enemy."

In The London Gazette dated 3 August 1858, the Nominal Return of Casualties, in action, in Her Majesty's Troops at Bareilly, on 5, 6 and 7 May 1858 indicates that Freeman was "dangerously wounded".

His VC is on display in the Lord Ashcroft Gallery at the Imperial War Museum, London.
