= 5th Bengal European Cavalry =

- Active: 1858-1859
- Country: India
- Allegiance: East India Company (1858); British India (1858-1859)
- Branch: Bengal Army (1841-1895); British Indian Army (1895-1921)
- Type: Cavalry
- Size: Regiment
- Engagements: Indian rebellion of 1857

The 5th Bengal European Cavalry was a cavalry regiment of the East India Company, created in 1858 and disbanded in 1859.

The regiment was raised in Bengal by the East India Company in 1858 as the 5th Bengal European Light Cavalry, for service in the Indian rebellion of 1857; the "European" in the name indicated that it was manned by white soldiers, not Indian sowars. During the Mutiny, a Major of the regiment, Charles John Stanley Gough, received the Victoria Cross.

== White Mutiny ==
As with all other "European" units of the Company, the 5th Bengal European Cavalry regiment was placed under the command of the British Crown following the end of the Mutiny in 1858 and the passage of the Government of India Act 1858. However, the regiment disbanded rather than be transferred into the British Army. The regiment had been among the most outspoken during "white mutiny" over the proposals to transfer the "European regiments" into the British Army.

The mutiny successfully achieved concessions from the British government, which allowed men to opt for free discharges and passage home as an alternative to transferring into the British Army.
