= Charles Anderson (VC) =

Recipient of the Victoria Cross

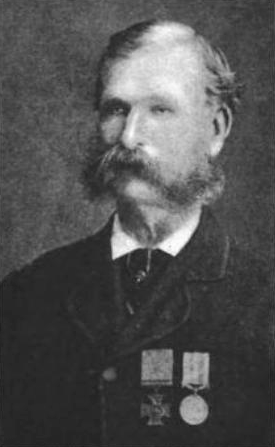
- Born: 1827; Liverpool, Lancashire, England, UK
- Died: 19 April 1899 (aged 71–72); Seaham Harbour, County Durham, England, UK
- Burial place: Princess Road Cemetery, Seaham Harbour
- Military career
- Allegiance: United Kingdom
- Branch: British Army
- Rank: Corporal
- Units: 2nd Queen's Dragoon Guards
- Conflicts: Indian Mutiny
- Awards: Victoria Cross

Charles Anderson (1827 – 19 April 1899) was by birth an English recipient of the Victoria Cross, the highest award for gallantry in the face of the enemy that can be awarded to British and Commonwealth forces.

Anderson was about 32 years old, and a private in the 2nd Queen's Dragoon Guards during the Indian Mutiny when the action for which he and Thomas Monaghan were awarded the Victoria Cross took place:

No. 875. Corporal (then Private) Charles Anderson, Date of Acts of Bravery, October 8th, 1858
For saving the life of Lieutenant-Colonel Seymour, C.B., commanding the regiment, in an attack made on him on the 8th of October, 1858, by mutinous sepoys, in a dense jungle of sugar canes, from which an attempt was made to dislodge them. The mutineers were between 30 and 40 in number. They suddenly opened fire on Lieutenant-Colonel Seymour and his party at a few yards distance, and immediately afterwards rushed in upon them with drawn (native) swords. Pistolling a man, cutting at him, and emptying with deadly effect at arm's length every barrel of his revolver, Lieutenant-Colonel Seymour was cut down by two sword cuts, when the two men above recommended, rushed to his rescue, and the Trumpeter shooting a man with his pistol in the act of cutting at him, and both Trumpeter and Dragoon driving at the enemy with their swords, enabled him to arise, and assist in defending himself again, when the whole of the enemy were dispatched. The occurrence took place soon after the action fought near Sundeela, Oudh, on the date abovementioned.

He later achieved the rank of corporal. Charles Anderson was buried at Princess Road Cemetery, Seaham, near Sunderland, County Durham in section A, grave 1271.

His Victoria Cross is displayed at the Queen's Dragoon Guards Regimental Museum in Cardiff Castle, Wales.
