= Alfred Stowell Jones =

Recipient of the Victoria Cross

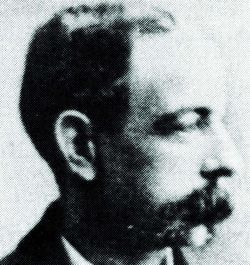
- Born: 24 January 1832; Liverpool, England
- Died: 29 May 1920 (aged 88); Finchampstead, London, England
- Military career
- Allegiance: United Kingdom
- Branch: British Army
- Service years: 1852–1872
- Rank: Lieutenant Colonel
- Units: 9th Lancers; 18th Hussars; 13th Regiment of Foot
- Conflicts: Indian Mutiny
- Awards: Victoria Cross
- Other work: Environmental engineer

Lieutenant Colonel Alfred Stowell Jones, VC (24 January 1832 – 29 May 1920) was an English recipient of the Victoria Cross, the highest and most prestigious award for gallantry in the face of the enemy that can be awarded to British and Commonwealth forces.

== Early life ==
Jones was the son of the Archdeacon John Jones. He was educated at Liverpool College and Sandhurst and entered the 9th Lancers in 1852.

== Details on the Victoria Cross ==
Jones was 25 years old, and a lieutenant in the 9th Lancers, British Army during the Indian Mutiny when the following deed on 8 June 1857 at Delhi, India took place for which he was awarded the Victoria Cross:

9th Lancers. Lieutenant Alfred Stowell Jones (now Captain 18th Hussars Date of Act of Bravery, 8 June 1857

"The Cavalry charged the rebels and rode through them. Lieutenant Jones, of the 9th Lancers, with his squadron, captured one of their guns, killing the drivers, and, with Lieutenant-Colonel Yule's assistance, turned it upon a village, occupied by the rebels, who were quickly dislodged. This was a well-conceived act, gallantly executed."

Despatch from Major-General James Hope Grant, K.C.B., dated 10 January 1858.

== Later life ==
Throughout the siege of Delhi he served as DAQMG to the cavalry and was mentioned in despatches three times and promoted Captain and Brevet-Major. After graduating from Staff College in 1861 he served on the Staff at the Cape 1861–67. He retired in 1872 with the rank of lieutenant colonel.

After retiring from the military Jones became an environmental engineer and won a prize from the Royal Agricultural Society for best managed sewage farm.

He lived at Ridge Cottage, Finchampstead, Berkshire. He died there, aged 88, on 29 May 1920 and is buried in the churchyard of St James in the village.

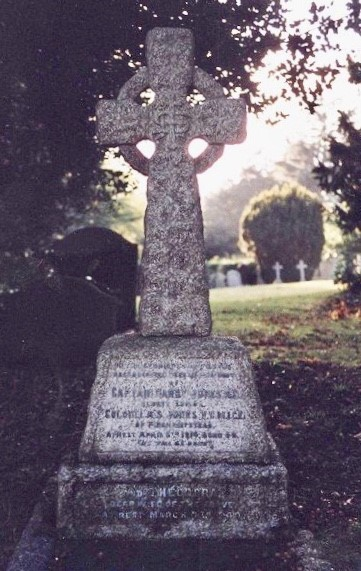
The grave of Alfred Stowell Jones in the churchyard of St James, Finchampstead.

== Family ==
Among his children were:

- Owen Jones, a lieutenant in the Royal Naval Reserve, married in 1902 Lillian Stevenson.
- Percy Jones, married in 1902 Olive Mary Edgar Clark, daughter of Major-General Edgar Clark, of the Bengal Staff Corps.

== Sources ==
- Location of grave and VC medal (Berkshire)
- Murphy, James (2008). Liverpool VCs. Pen and Sword Books. ISBN 978-1844157808.
