= Henry Hartigan =

Irish recipient of the Victoria Cross

- Born: March 1826; Drumlea, Enniskillen, County Fermanagh
- Died: 29 October 1886 (aged 60); Calcutta, British India
- Burial place: Barrackpore New Cemetery
- Military career
- Allegiance: United Kingdom
- Branch: British Army
- Rank: Lieutenant
- Units: 9th Lancers
- Conflicts: Crimean War
- Awards: Victoria Cross

Henry Hartigan VC (March 1826 – 29 October 1886) was born Drumlea, Enniskillen, County Fermanagh and was an Irish recipient of the Victoria Cross, the highest and most prestigious award for gallantry in the face of the enemy that can be awarded to British and Commonwealth forces.

== Details ==
He was about 31 years old, and a Pensioned sergeant in the 9th Lancers, British Army during the Indian Mutiny when the following deeds took place for which he was awarded the VC:

9th Lancers. Pensioned Serjeant H. Hartigan.

Date of Acts of Bravery, 8th June and 10th October, 1857.

For daring and distinguished gallantry in the following instances:— At the battle of Budle-ke Serai, near Delhi, on the 8th June, 1857, in going to the assistance of Serjeant H. Helstone, who was wounded, dismounted, and surrounded by the enemy, and at the risk of his own life, carrying him to the rear.

On the 10 October 1857, at Agra, in having run unarmed to the assistance of Serjeant Crews, who was attacked by four rebels.

Hartigan caught a tulwar, from one of them with his right hand, and with the other hit him on the mouth, disarmed him, and then defended himself against the other three, killing one and wounding two, when he was himself disabled from further service by severe and dangerous wounds.

== Further information ==
He later achieved the rank of lieutenant. He died in Calcutta, India on 29 October 1886.
