= Robert Kells =

Recipient of the Victoria Cross (1832–1905)

Robert Kells VC RVM
- Born: 7 April 1832; Meerut, British India
- Died: 14 April 1905 (aged 73); Lambeth, London
- Burial place: Lambeth Cemetery
- Military career
- Allegiance: United Kingdom
- Branch: British Army
- Rank: Sergeant
- Units: 9th Lancers; 1st Bengal European Light Cavalry; 19th Hussars
- Conflicts: Second Anglo-Sikh War; Indian Mutiny
- Awards: Victoria Cross
- Other work: Yeoman of the Guard

Robert Kells, VC RVM (7 April 1832 – 14 April 1905) was a recipient of the Victoria Cross.

== Details ==
Kells was born in India on 7 April 1832 in Meerut. When 25 years old, and a lance corporal in the 9th Lancers (The Queen's Royal), British Army during the Indian Mutiny when the following deed took place on 28 September 1857 at Bolandshahr, India for which he was awarded the VC:

For conspicuous bravery at Bolundshahur, on the 28th of September, 1857, in defending against a number of the enemy his commanding officer, Captain Drysdale, who was lying in a street with his collar-bone broken, his horse having been disabled by a shot, and remaining with him until out of danger. Despatch from Major-General Sir James Hope Grant, K.C.B., dated 8th April, 1858.

== Further information ==
He later joined the 1st Bengal European Light Cavalry (renamed the 19th Hussars in 1862) and achieved the rank of sergeant. He retired in 1868 and was appointed a Yeoman of the Queen's (Queen Victoria) Bodyguard on 1 January 1881. In June 1901 he received the Royal Victorian Medal from King Edward VII during an inspection of the Yeomen.

Kells died on 14 April 1905 and he is buried in Lambeth Cemetery in South London.

His Victoria Cross medal is one of four of his on display at the regimental museum of the 9th/12th Royal Lancers in Derby Museum and Art Gallery. These medals sold at auction in 2006 for £130,000.
