= Baroun =

- town
- Country: India
- State: Uttar Pradesh

Languages
  - Official: Hindi
- Time zone: UTC+5:30 (IST)
- Vehicle registration: UP
- Website: up.gov.in

Baroun is a small area in the Farrukhabad city of Uttar Pradesh, India. It has a current population of 6,006.
