= James Reynolds Roberts =

English recipient of the Victoria Cross

- Born: c. 1826; Stratford-le-Bow, London, England
- Died: 1 August 1859 (aged 33); Marylebone, London
- Burial place: Paddington Old Cemetery
- Military career
- Allegiance: United Kingdom
- Branch: British Army
- Rank: Private
- Units: 9th Lancers
- Conflicts: Indian Mutiny
- Awards: Victoria Cross

James Reynolds Roberts VC (c. 1826 – 1 August 1859) was an English recipient of the Victoria Cross, the highest and most prestigious award for gallantry in the face of the enemy that can be awarded to British and Commonwealth forces.

== Details ==
Roberts was about 31 years old, and a private in the 9th Lancers (The Queen's Royal), British Army during the Indian Mutiny when the following deed took place on 28 September 1857 at Bolandshahr, India for which he was awarded the Victoria Cross.

For conspicuous gallantry at Bolundshahur, on the 28th of September, 1857, in bringing a comrade, mortally wounded, through a street under a heavy musketry fire, in which service he was himself wounded. (Despatch from Major-General Sir James Hope Grant, K.C.B., dated 8th April, 1858).

His Victoria Cross is displayed at the Regimental Museum of the 9th/12th Royal Lancers at The Strand, Derby, England.
