= William George Hawtry Bankes =

Recipient of the Victoria Cross (1836–1858)

William George Hawtry Bankes VC
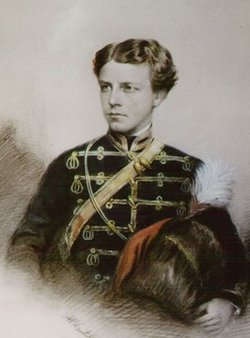
- Born: 11 September 1836; Kingston Lacy, Wimborne Minster, Dorset
- Died: 6 April 1858 (aged 21); Lucknow, British India
- Military career
- Allegiance: United Kingdom
- Branch: British Army
- Service years: 1857–1858
- Rank: Cornet
- Units: 7th Hussars (The Queen's Own)
- Conflicts: Indian Mutiny
- Awards: Victoria Cross

William George Hawtry Bankes VC (11 September 1836 – 6 April 1858) was an English recipient of the Victoria Cross, the highest and most prestigious award for gallantry in the face of the enemy that can be awarded to British and Commonwealth forces.

He was educated at Westminster School, and in 1857 enlisted in the Army.

Bankes was 21 years old, and a Cornet in the 7th Hussars (The Queen's Own), British Army during the Indian Mutiny when the following deed on 19 March 1858 at Lucknow in India took place for which he was awarded the VC as published in the London Gazette:

Cornet William George Hawtrey Bankes, 7th Hussars, upon whom the Commander-in-Chief in India has reported that the Decoration of the Victoria Cross has been provisionally conferred, for conspicuous gallantry, in thrice charging a body of infuriated fanatics, who had rushed on the guns employed in shelling a small mud fort in the vicinity of Moosa-Bagh, Lucknow, on the 19th of March, 1858, of the wounds received on which occasion he subsequently died, would have been recommended to Her Majesty for confirmation in that distinction, had he survived. Cornet Bankes led three charges against a body of rebels who had rushed the guns in the vicinity of Moosa-Bagh. In the course of these charges the young officer was almost cut to pieces. He died of his wounds 18 days later.

As Bankes was dying Queen Victoria wrote of his plight in a letter to the Princess Royal:

There is a poor young man – of the name Bankes – who has been cut almost to pieces – he fell and was surrounded by a set of fanatics who cut at him, his thigh was nearly severed from his body – and so was his arm! Besides six other desperate wounds! He has had his right leg and his right arm amputated – and yet they hope he will live. This is, they say, the pattern of patience and fortitude.

Bankes was awarded the VC when the award criteria for the medal was amended to allow posthumous awards.

== The Medal ==
His Victoria Cross is displayed at the Lord Ashcroft Gallery, Imperial War Museum, London. A copy VC is on display alongside his portrait at Kingston Lacy, Dorset, England.
