= David Spence (VC) =

Scottish recipient of the Victoria Cross

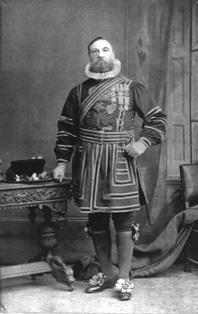
- as Yeoman of the Guard
- Born: 1818; Inverkeithing, Fife
- Died: 17 April 1877 (aged 58); Lambeth, London
- Burial place: Lambeth Cemetery
- Military career
- Allegiance: United Kingdom
- Branch: British Army
- Rank: Regimental Sergeant-Major
- Units: 9th Lancers
- Conflicts: First Anglo-Sikh War; Second Anglo-Sikh War; Indian Mutiny
- Awards: Victoria Cross
- Other work: Yeoman of the Guard

David Spence VC (1818 – 17 April 1877) was a Scottish recipient of the Victoria Cross.

== Details ==
Spence was born in 1818 in Inverkeithing, Fife, Scotland. He joined the 9th Queen's Royal Lancers in 1842. When he was 40 years old, and a troop sergeant-major in the 9th Lancers, British Army during the Indian Mutiny when the following deed took place on 17 January 1858 at Shumsabad, India for which he was awarded the VC:

Troop Serjeant-Major Spence

Date of Act of Bravery, 17th January, 1858

For conspicuous gallantry on the 17th of January, 1858, at Shumsabad, in going to the assistance of Private Kidd, who had been wounded, and his horse disabled, and bringing him out from a large number of rebels. Despatch from Major-General Sir James Hope Grant, K.C.B., dated 8th April, 1858.

== Further information ==
He later achieved the rank of regimental sergeant-major and in 1862 became a Yeoman of the Guard.

== The medal ==
His Victoria Cross is displayed at the Regimental Museum of the 9th/12th Royal Lancers in Derby Museum, England.
