= Patrick Donohoe =

- Born: c. 1820; Nenagh, County Tipperary
- Died: 16 August 1876 (aged 55-56); Bride Street, Dublin
- Burial place: Glasnevin Cemetery
- Military career
- Allegiance: United Kingdom
- Branch: British Army
- Rank: Private
- Units: 9th Lancers
- Conflicts: Indian Mutiny
- Awards: Victoria Cross

Patrick Donohoe VC (c. 1820 – 16 August 1876) was an Irish recipient of the Victoria Cross.

== Details ==
He was approximately 37 years old and a private in the 9th Lancers, British Army during the Indian Mutiny when the following deed took place on 28 September 1857, at Bolandshahr, India, for which he was awarded the VC:

For having, at Bolundshahur, on the 28th of September, 1857, gone to the support of Lieutenant Blair, who had been severely wounded, and, with a few other men, brought that officer in safety through a large body of the enemy's cavalry. (Despatch from Major-General Sir James Hope Grant, K.C.B., dated 8th April, 1858.)

== Further information ==
Born at Nenagh, County Tipperary, Ireland. His death certificate records that he died at Bride Street, Dublin, on 16 August 1876 and he was buried in Glasnevin Cemetery.
