= William Goate =

Recipient of the Victoria Cross

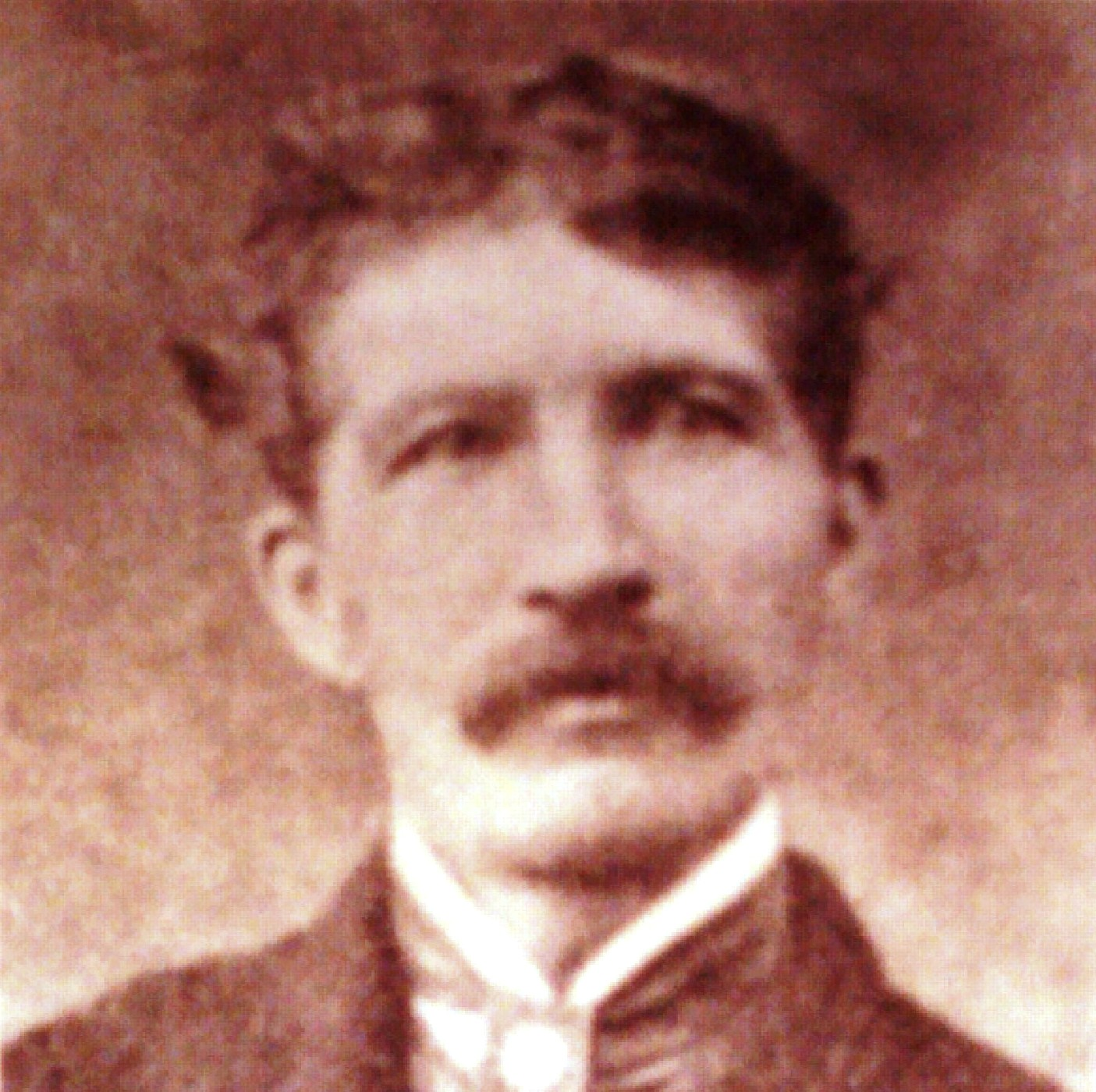
- from display in Derby Museum
- Born: 12 January 1836; Fritton, Norfolk, England
- Died: 24 October 1901 (aged 65); Southsea, Portsmouth, England
- Burial place: Highland Road Cemetery, Portsmouth
- Military career
- Allegiance: United Kingdom
- Branch: British Army
- Rank: Corporal
- Units: 9th Lancers
- Conflicts: Indian Mutiny
- Awards: Victoria Cross

William Goate (or Goat) VC (12 January 1836 – 24 October 1901) was an English recipient of the Victoria Cross.

== Details ==
Goate was 22 years old, and a Lance Corporal in the 9th Lancers, British Army during the Indian Mutiny when the following deed took place on 6 March 1858 at the Capture of Lucknow, India for which he was awarded the VC:

For conspicuous gallantry at Lucknow, on the 6th of March, 1858, in having dismounted, in the presence of a number of the enemy, and taken up the body of Major Smyth, 2nd Dragoon Guards, which he attempted to bring off the field, and after being obliged to relinquish it, being surrounded by the enemy's cavalry, he went a second time under a heavy fire to recover the body. Despatch from Major-General Sir James Hope Grant, K.C.B., dated 8th April, 1858.

He later achieved the rank of Corporal.

== Later life ==
Goate moved to Southsea in May 1900 having lived in Jarrow and worked for 22 years in Palmers shipbuilding firm and that for 18 years he was a member of the Jarrow Company of the Volunteers in which he held the same rank as he did in the Lancers. He died aged 64 at 22 Leopold Street, Southsea, from cancer.

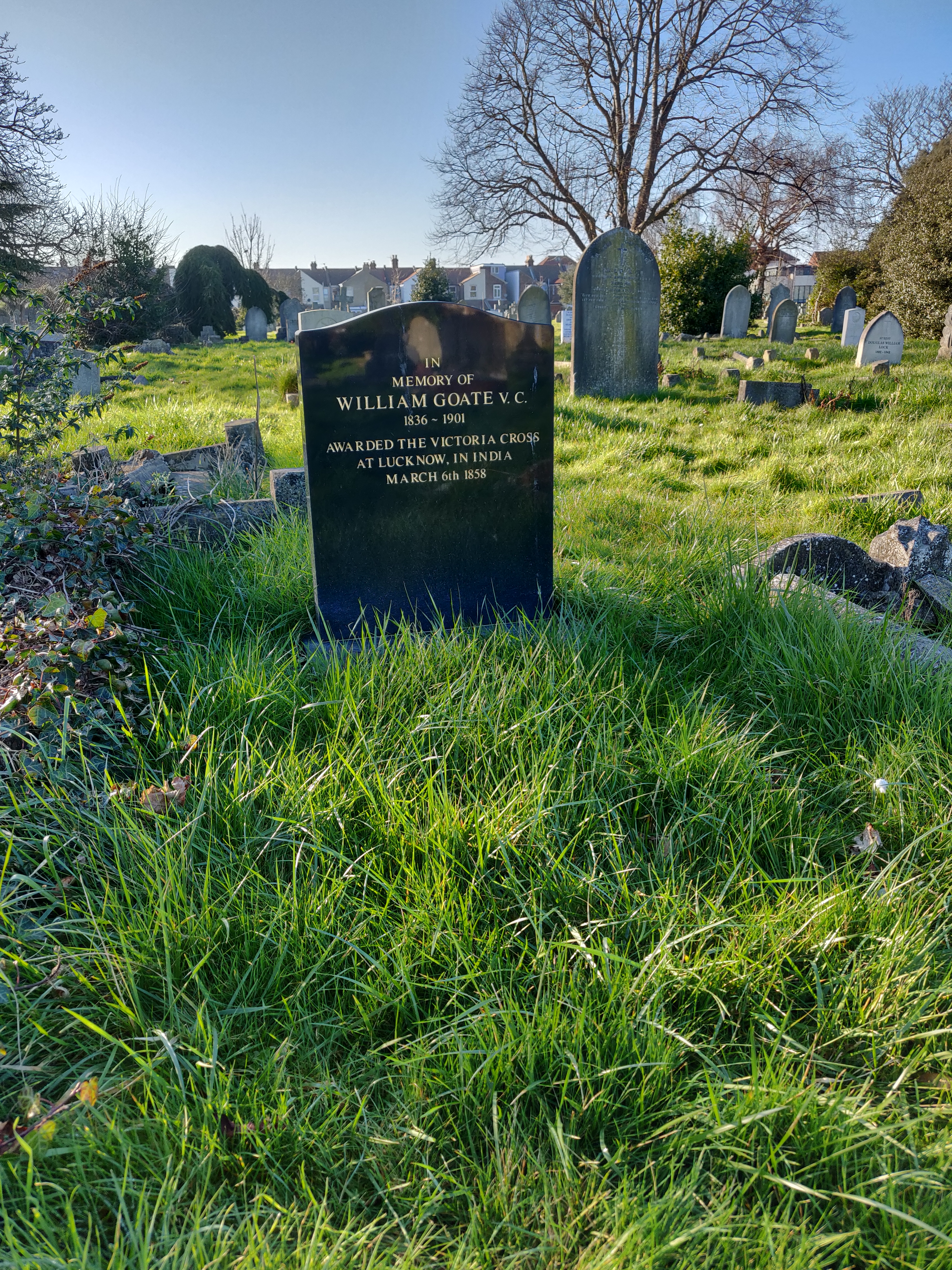
Grave of William Goate V.C.

Goat was buried in Highland Road Cemetery and the grave has been reused twice since. There was no headstone marking his grave, but a memorial stone was erected in October 2003.

== Medal ==
His Victoria Cross is displayed in the Regimental Museum of the 9th/12th Royal Lancers at Derby Museum, England.

== Bibliography ==
- Whitworth, Alan (2015). VCs of the North: Cumbria, Durham & Northumberland. Pen and Sword Books. ISBN 978-1473848221.
