= Hope Grant =

British Army officer (1808–1875)

General Sir Hope Grant GCB
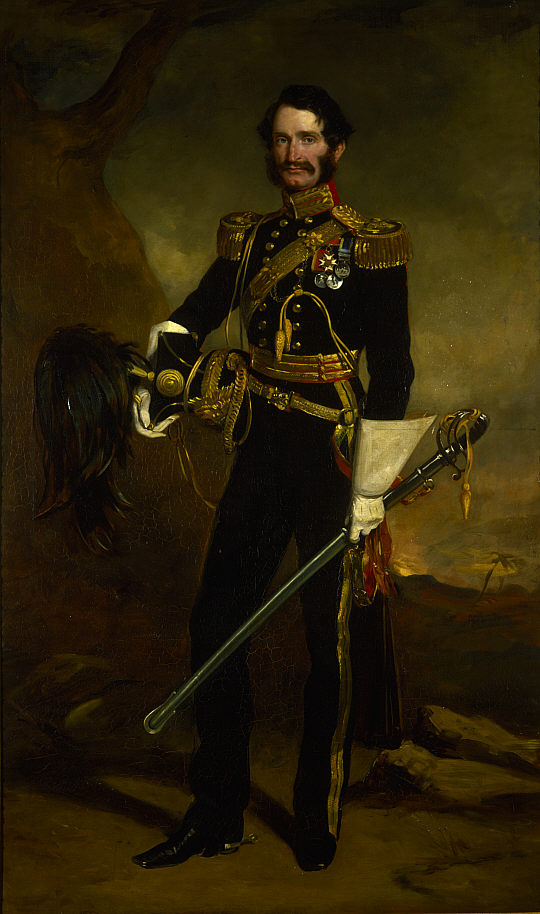
- Portrait of Hope Grant by his brother Francis Grant, 1853
- Born: 22 July 1808
- Died: 7 March 1875 (aged 66); London, England
- Military career
- Allegiance: United Kingdom
- Branch: British Army
- Service years: 1826–1875
- Rank: General
- Commands: Commander of British Troops in China and Hong Kong; Madras Army; Aldershot Division
- Conflicts: First Opium War; First Anglo-Sikh War; Indian Mutiny of 1857; Battle of the Cavalry Lines; Second Opium War
- Awards: Knight Grand Cross of the Order of the Bath

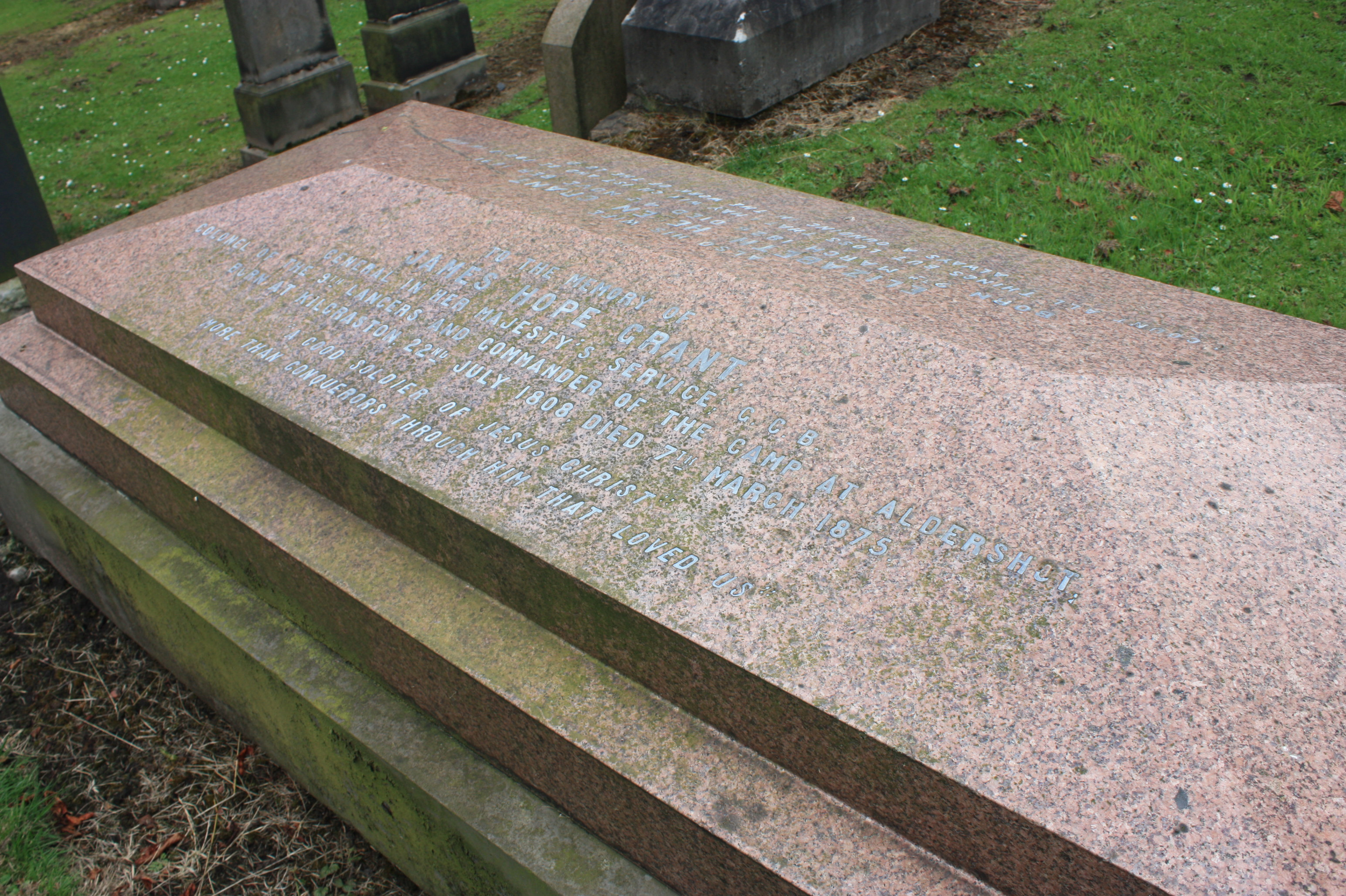
Grave of General James Hope Grant

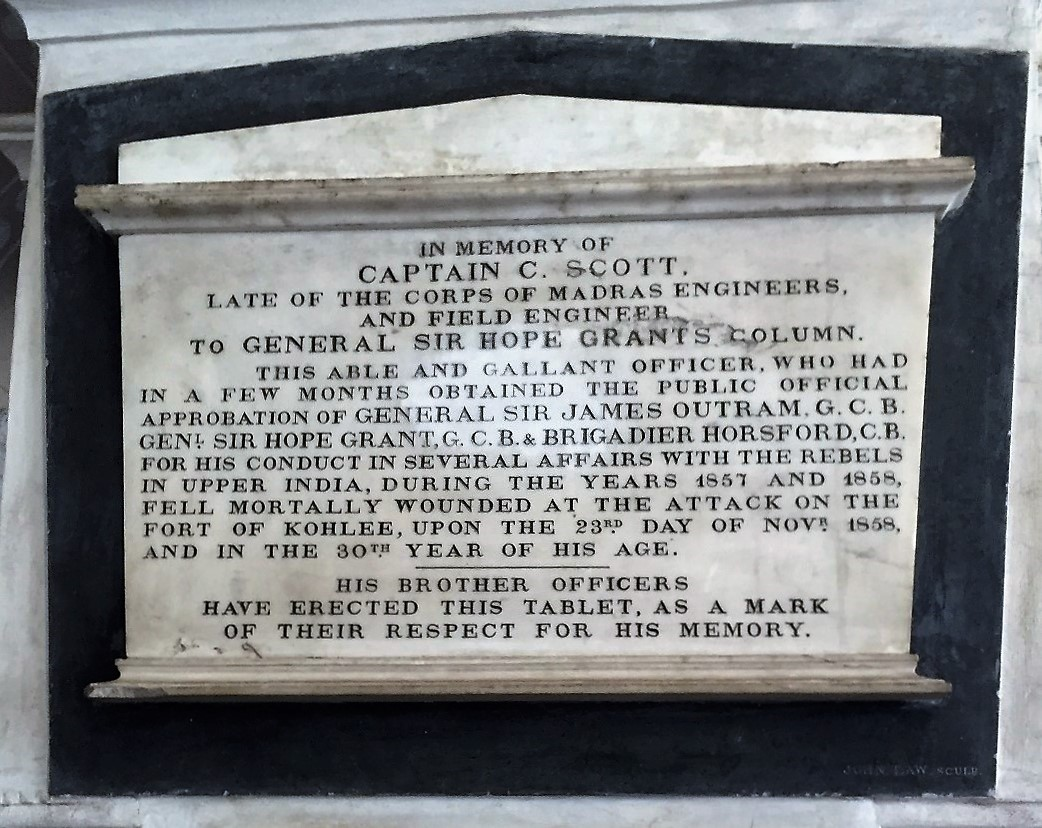
Captain C Scott of the Gen. Sir. Hope Grant's Column, Sepoy Mutiny, 1857. Memorial at the St. Mary's Church, Madras

General Sir James Hope Grant, GCB (22 July 1808 – 7 March 1875) was a British Army officer. He served in the First Opium War, First Anglo-Sikh War, Indian Rebellion of 1857, and Second Opium War.

== Early life ==
Grant was the fifth and youngest son of Francis Grant of Kilgraston, Perthshire.

== Military career ==
He entered the British Army in 1826 as cornet in the 9th Lancers, and became lieutenant in 1828 and captain in 1835. In 1842 he was brigade-major to Lord Saltoun in the First Opium War, and distinguished himself at the capture of Chinkiang, after which he received the rank of major and the CB. There is a popular, possibly apocryphal, story that he was selected by Saltoun (a keen violinist) because he wanted a cellist to accompany him and Hope Grant was the only officer he could find who played the cello. In the First Anglo-Sikh War of 1845–1846 he took part in the battle of Sobraon; and in the Punjab campaign of 1848–1849 he commanded the 9th Lancers, and won high reputation in the Battles of Chillianwalla and Gujarat.

He was promoted brevet lieutenant-colonel and shortly afterwards to the same substantive rank. In 1854 he became brevet-colonel, and in 1856 brigadier of cavalry. He took a leading part in the suppression of the Indian Mutiny of 1857, holding for some time the command of the cavalry division, and afterwards of a movable column of horse and foot.

After rendering valuable service in the operations before Delhi and in the final assault on the city, he directed the victorious march of the cavalry and horse artillery dispatched in the direction of Cawnpore to open up communication with the commander-in-chief Sir Colin Campbell, whom he met near the Alambagh, and who raised him to the rank of brigadier-general, and placed the whole force under his command during what remained of the perilous march to Lucknow for the relief of the residency. After the retirement towards Cawnpore he greatly aided in effecting there the total rout of the rebel troops, by making a detour which threatened their rear; and following in pursuit with a flying column, he defeated them with the loss of nearly all their guns at Serai Ghat.

He also took part in the operations connected with the recapture of Lucknow, shortly after which he was promoted to the rank of major-general, and appointed to the command of the force employed for the final pacification of India. Before the work of pacification was quite completed he was created KCB. In 1859 he was appointed, with the local rank of lieutenant-general, to be Commander of British Troops in China and Hong Kong and to lead the British land forces in the Anglo-French expedition against China. The object of the campaign was accomplished within three months of the landing of the forces at Pei-tang (1 August 1860). The Taku Forts had been carried by assault, the Chinese defeated three times in the open and Peking occupied.

== Later life ==
For his conduct in this, which has been called the most successful and the best carried out of Britain's "little wars," he received the thanks of parliament and was gazetted GCB.

In 1861, he was made lieutenant-general and appointed commander-in-chief of the Madras Army; on this appointment he was automatically made a member of the Madras Legislative Council and held a seat from 1861 to 1864.

On his return to England in 1865 he was made Quartermaster-General to the Forces at headquarters; and in 1870 he was transferred to the command of Aldershot Division, where he took a leading part in the reform of the educational and training systems of the forces, which followed the Franco-German War. The introduction of annual army manoeuvres was largely due to Grant. In 1872 he was promoted to full general.

He died in London on 7 March 1875. He is buried in Grange Cemetery in Edinburgh.

Military offices
Preceded by Sir Charles van Straubenzee	Commander of British Troops in China and Hong Kong; 1860–1861	Succeeded by Sir John Michel
Preceded by Sir Patrick Grant	C-in-C, Madras Army; 1861–1864	Succeeded by Sir John Le Marchant
Preceded by Sir Richard Airey	Quartermaster-General to the Forces; 1865–1870	Succeeded by Sir Frederick Haines
Preceded by Sir James Scarlett	GOC-in-C Aldershot Division; 1870–1875	Succeeded by Sir Thomas Steele
