= 1870s =

Decade

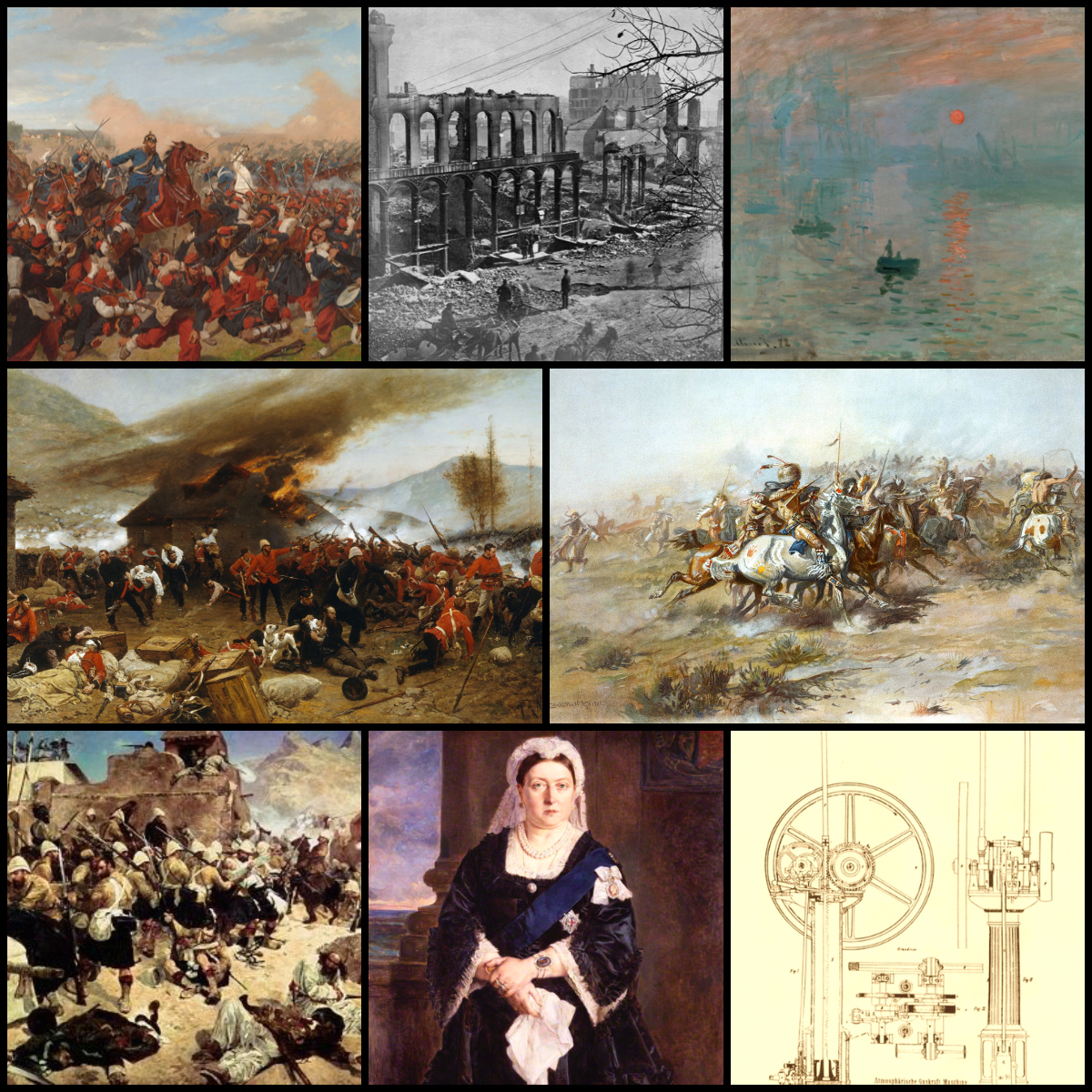
From left to right, clockwise: Conflicts start to increase between the Second French Empire and the Kingdom of Prussia leading to the Franco-Prussian War in 1870; a fire in Chicago kills approximately 300 people and leaves about another 100,000 people homeless in 1871; Claude Monet's Impression, Sunrise is recognized as the source of inspiration for the Impressionist movement; The U.S. Army is defeated by Arapaho, Lakota and Northern Cheyenne tribes during the Battle of the Little Bighorn in 1876; Nicolaus Otto patents the first commercial four-stroke internal combustion engine; Queen Victoria is recognized as the "Empress of India" in the Royal Titles Act 1876; Emirate of Afghanistan forces defend against British Raj invaders in the Second Anglo-Afghan War; British Empire and Zulu Kingdom fighters engage in combat during the Anglo-Zulu War.

The 1870s (pronounced "eighteen-seventies") was a decade of the Gregorian calendar that began on 1 January 1870, and ended on 31 December 1879.

The trends of the previous decade continued into this one, as great new empires, imperialism and militarism rose in Europe and Asia. The United States was recovering from the American Civil War, though the Reconstruction era introduced its own legacies of bitterness and racial segregation in the country. Germany unified as a nation in 1871 and became the German Empire. Changing social conditions led workforces to cooperate in the form of labor unions in order to demand better pay and working conditions, with strikes occurring worldwide in the later part of the decade and continuing until World War I. The decade was also a period of significant technological advancement; the phonograph, telephone, and electric light bulb were all invented during the 1870s, though it would take several more decades before they became household items.

The last living person from this decade, Jeanne Calment, died in 1997.

== Politics and wars ==
=== Wars ===
- Dungan Revolt (1862–1877), Hui uprising against the Qing Empire which resulted in 20 million deaths and a Qing victory
- Franco-Prussian War (1870–1871), resulted in French defeat. The Second French Empire collapsed and the powerful new German Empire emerged.
- Third Anglo-Ashanti War, also known as the "First Ashanti Expedition" (1873–1874), ended with the destruction of the royal palace at Kumasi and the signing of the Treaty of Fomena, which secured British trading rights in the area
- The Third Carlist War (1872–1876), the last of the Carlist Wars in Spain
- Ethiopian–Egyptian War (1874–1876), a resource conflict over access to the Nile River basin between the Ethiopian Empire and the Khedivate of Egypt, resulting in an Ethiopian victory
- Russo-Turkish War (1877–1878), resulted in Serbia, Romania, and Montenegro becoming completely independent from the Ottoman Empire, while Bulgaria became autonomous
- Second Anglo-Afghan War (1878–1880), fought between the British Raj and the Emirate of Afghanistan
- Anglo-Zulu War (11 January – 5 July 1879) fought between in present-day South Africa.
- War of the Pacific (1879–1884), fought over resource-rich territory along the Pacific coast between Chile and an alliance of Bolivia and Peru

=== Colonization, decolonization, and independence ===
- The British Empire continued to grow, with the 1870s marking the beginning of the New Imperialism.
- Bulgaria and Romania declared independence following a war against the Ottoman Empire.
- The Sioux battled the United States Cavalry and resisted encroachment by white settlers on the Great Plains.

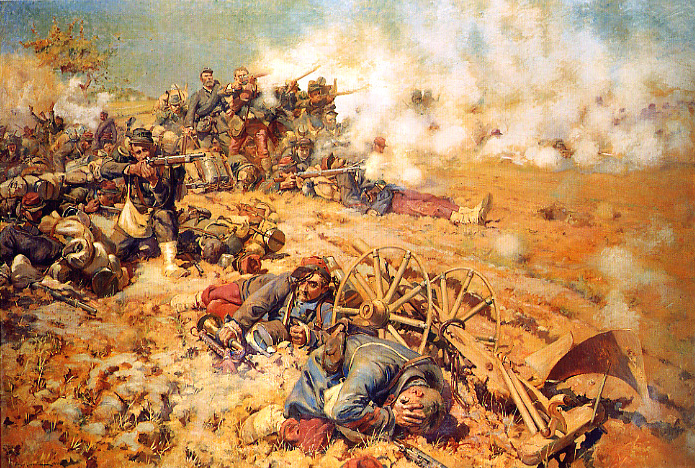
Franco-Prussian War

=== Political and social events ===
- The German Empire and Alliance System emerged.
- Racial politics at the height of America's Reconstruction Era (1863-1877)_ were bitter and sometimes violent.
- The Gilded Age began in 1877, lasting until 1896 in the United States.
- The First Spanish Republic rises and promptly ends (1873–1874).
- The first Ottoman Constitution is promulgated in 1876, starting the First Constitutional Era (1876–1878).
- Contested US presidential election of 1876

== Science and technology ==
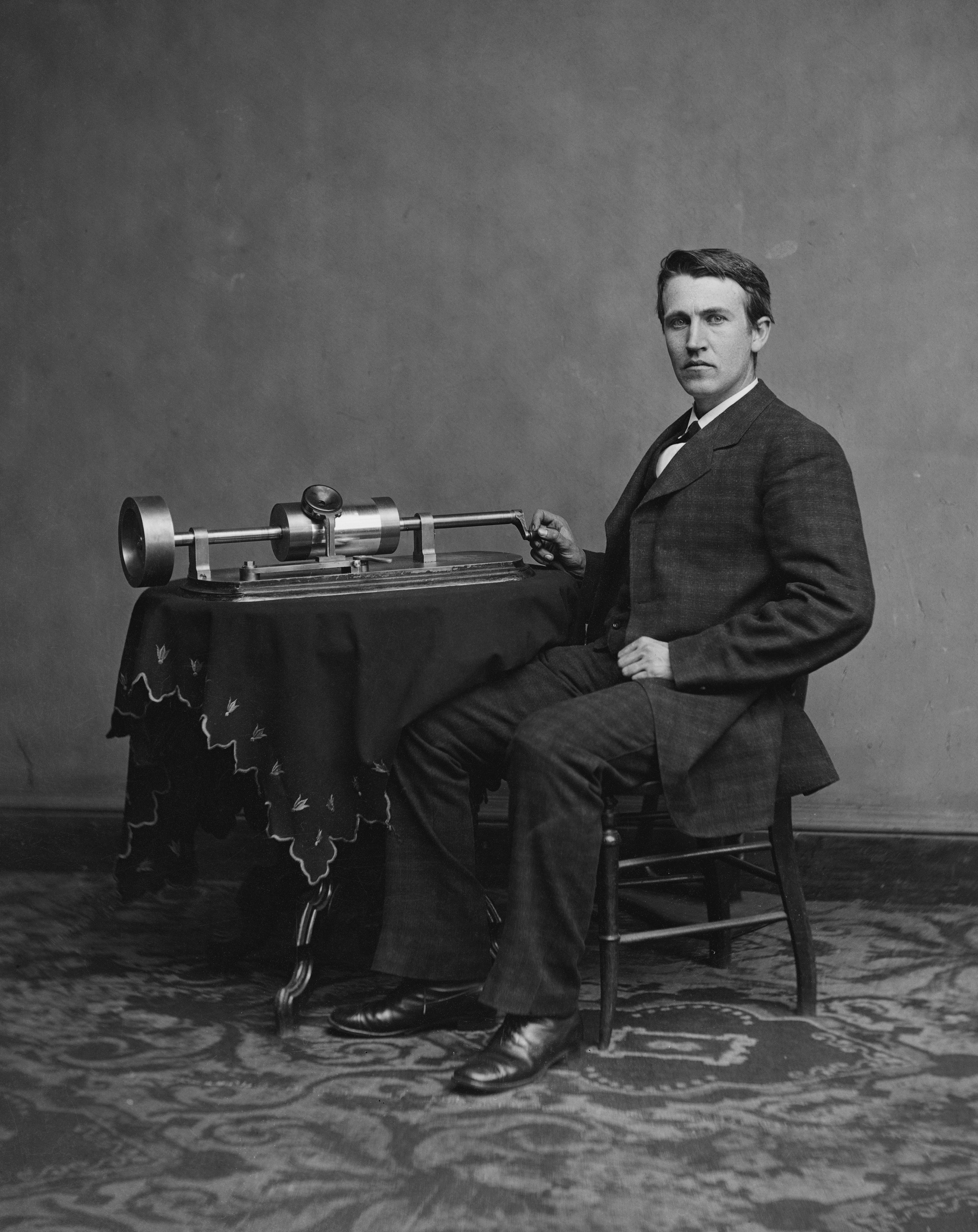
Photograph of Thomas Edison with his phonograph, taken by Mathew Brady in 1877

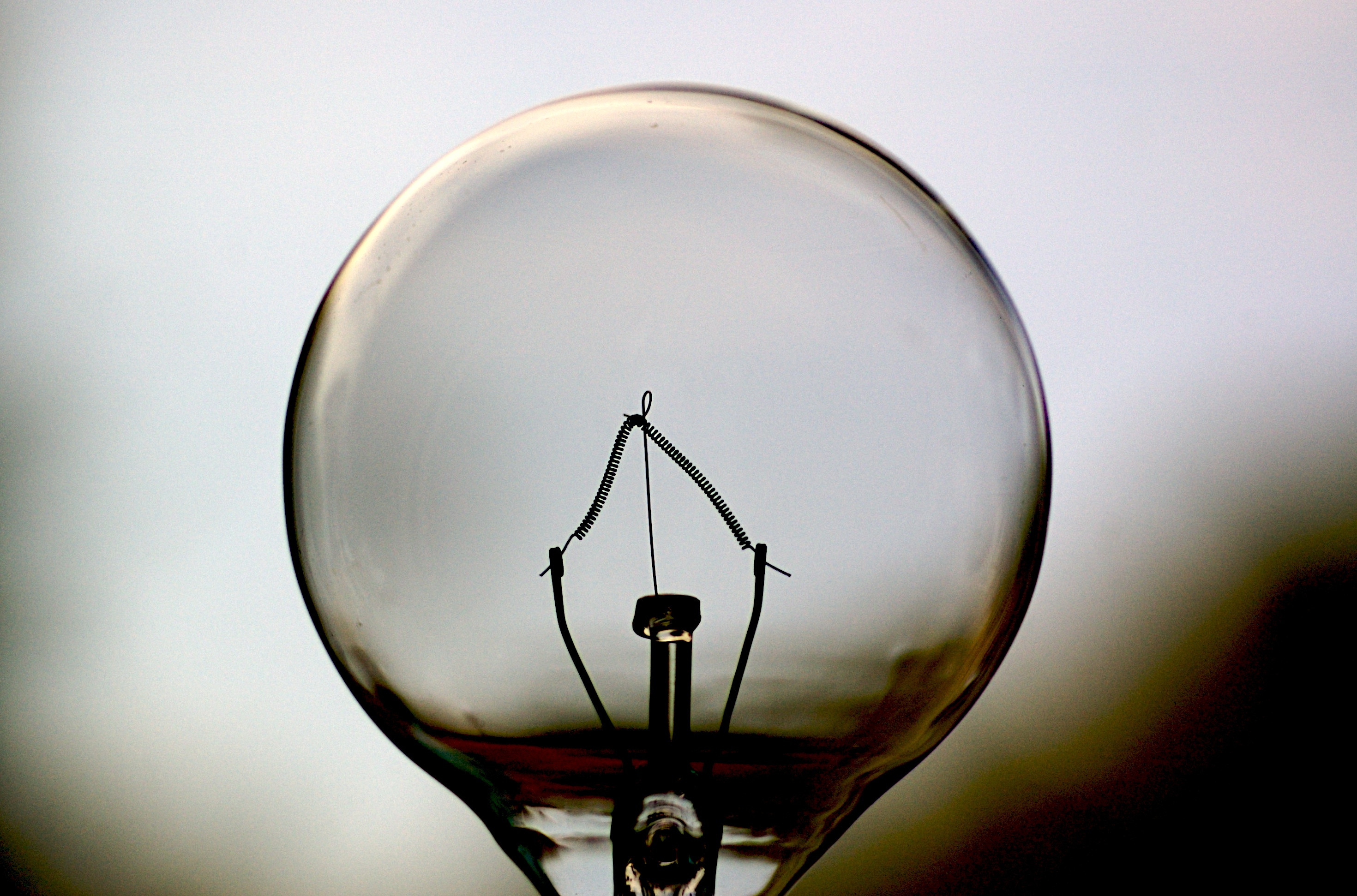
The first version of the light bulb was invented by Edison in 1879

- The prototype telephone was invented by Alexander Graham Bell in 1876.
- The phonograph is invented in 1877 by Thomas Edison.
- The 6.35mm headphone jack was invented in 1878 and is still widely used today.
- The first version of the light bulb was invented by Thomas Edison in 1879.
- The steam drill is invented in 1879.
- Ludwig Boltzmann statistically defined thermodynamic entropy.
- 1873 Weltausstellung in Vienna, 1876 Centennial Exposition in Philadelphia and 1878 Exposition universelle in Paris.

== Environment ==
- Atlas bear became extinct in 1870.
- Yellowstone National Park was established and signed into law in 1872.

== Popular culture ==
=== Literature and arts ===
- Jules Verne (France) publishes Around the World in Eighty Days in Paris in 1872.
- Claude Monet, Pierre-Auguste Renoir, Camille Pissarro, and Alfred Sisley organized the Société Anonyme Coopérative des Artistes Peintres, Sculpteurs, Graveurs ("Cooperative and Anonymous Association of Painters, Sculptors, and Engravers") for the purpose of exhibiting their artworks independently. Members of the association, which soon included Paul Cézanne, Berthe Morisot, and Edgar Degas, were expected to forswear participation in the Salon. The organizers invited a number of other progressive artists to join them in their inaugural exhibition, including the slightly older Eugène Boudin, whose example had first persuaded Monet to take up plein air painting years before. Another painter who greatly influenced Monet and his friends, Johan Jongkind, declined to participate, as did Manet. In total, thirty artists participated in their first exhibition, held in April 1874 at the studio of the photographer Nadar. The group soon became known as the Impressionists.
- Jeanne Calment, born 1875, would eventually become the longest-living human being with a verified lifespan. She lived until 1997, aged 122. She still holds the record as of May 2026.
- Lewis Carroll publishes Through the Looking-Glass in 1871.
- Mark Twain publishes The Adventures of Tom Sawyer in 1876.
- Henrik Ibsen releases A Doll's House in 1879.

== People ==
=== Politics ===
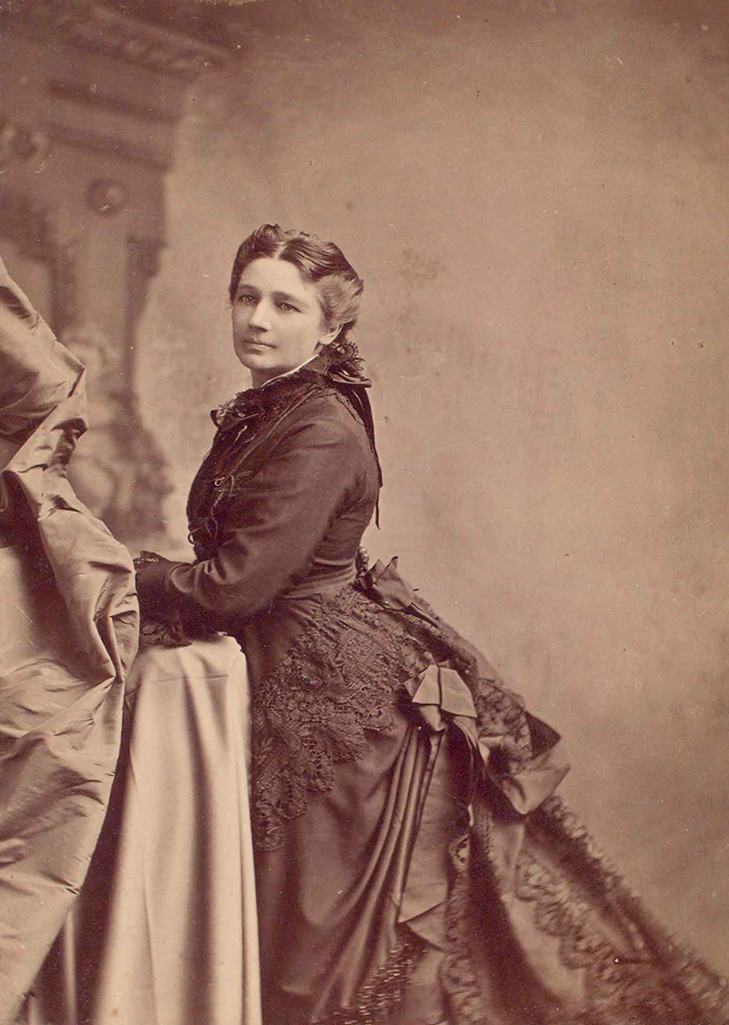
Victoria Woodhull, 1870.

- Presidency of Ulysses S. Grant, 1869-1877, dominated by Reconstruction issues.
- Rutherford B Hayes, elected US President in disputed election of 1876.
- Victoria Woodhull, reformer, publisher, and first woman to run for the U.S. presidency, in 1872.
- Hiram R. Revels, the first African American to serve in either house of the U.S. Congress, elected in 1870.
- Joseph Rainey, the first black person to serve in the United States House of Representatives, elected in 1870.
- Kalākaua, the king of the Kingdom of Hawaiʻi from 1874, associated with the revival of hula and flourishing court culture.
- Giovanni Passannante, anarchist, attempted assassin of Umberto I of Italy in 1878.

=== Visual Arts ===
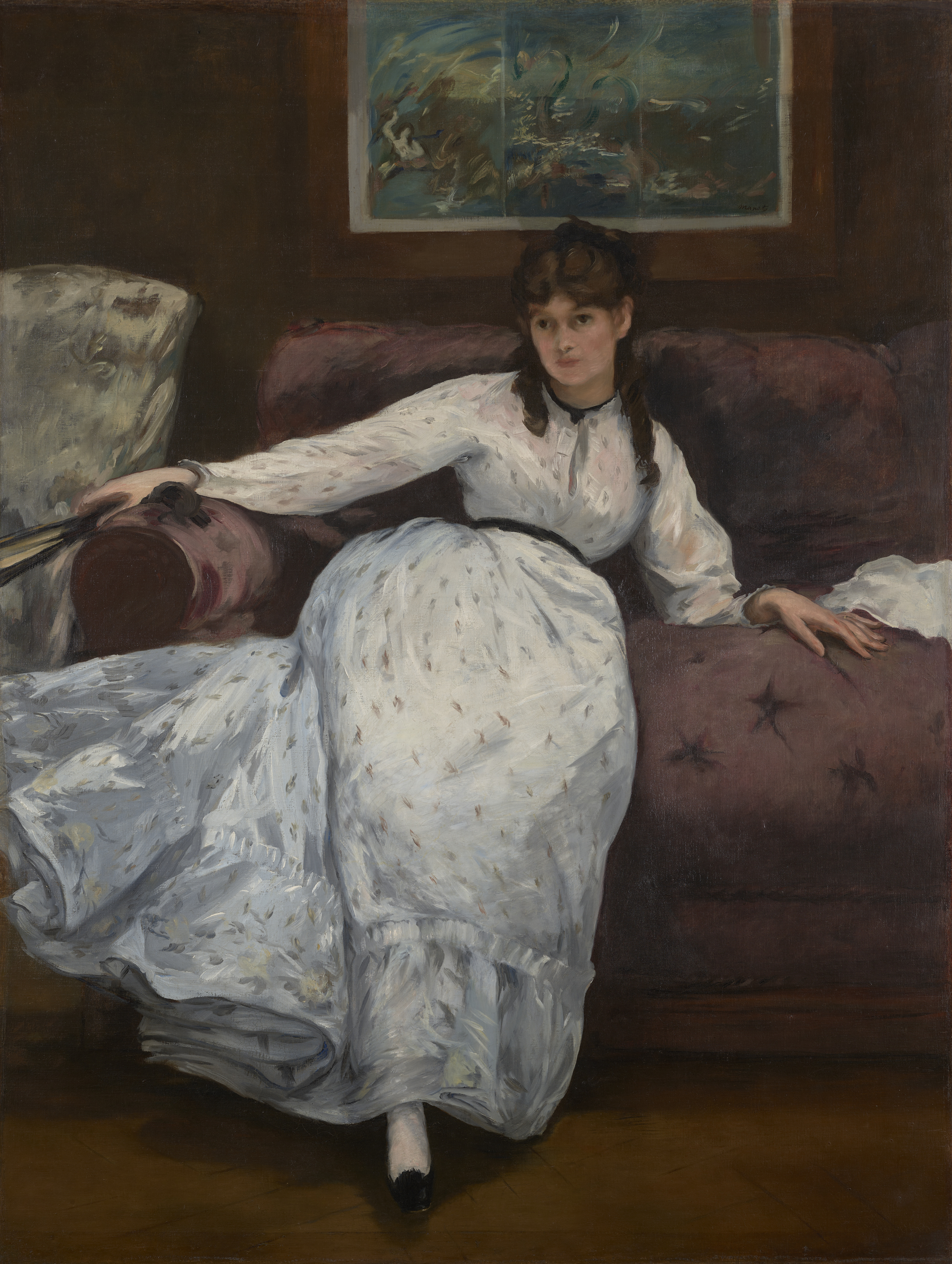
Berthe Morisot painted by Édouard Manet, 1871.

- James Tissot, French society painter known for depicting the decade's fashionable dress and society.
- Berthe Morisot, French painter associated with the first generation of Impressionism.
- Édouard Manet, modernist painter associated with French impressionism.
- Edgar Degas, French painter and sculptor who depicted modern life in Paris.
- Thomas Eakins, a pivotal American painter who helped define American realism.
- Winslow Homer, American painter and illustrator associated with post-Civil War American art.
- Dante Gabriel Rossetti, highly influential English painter, notable member and founder of the Pre-Raphaelite Brotherhood.

=== Writers ===
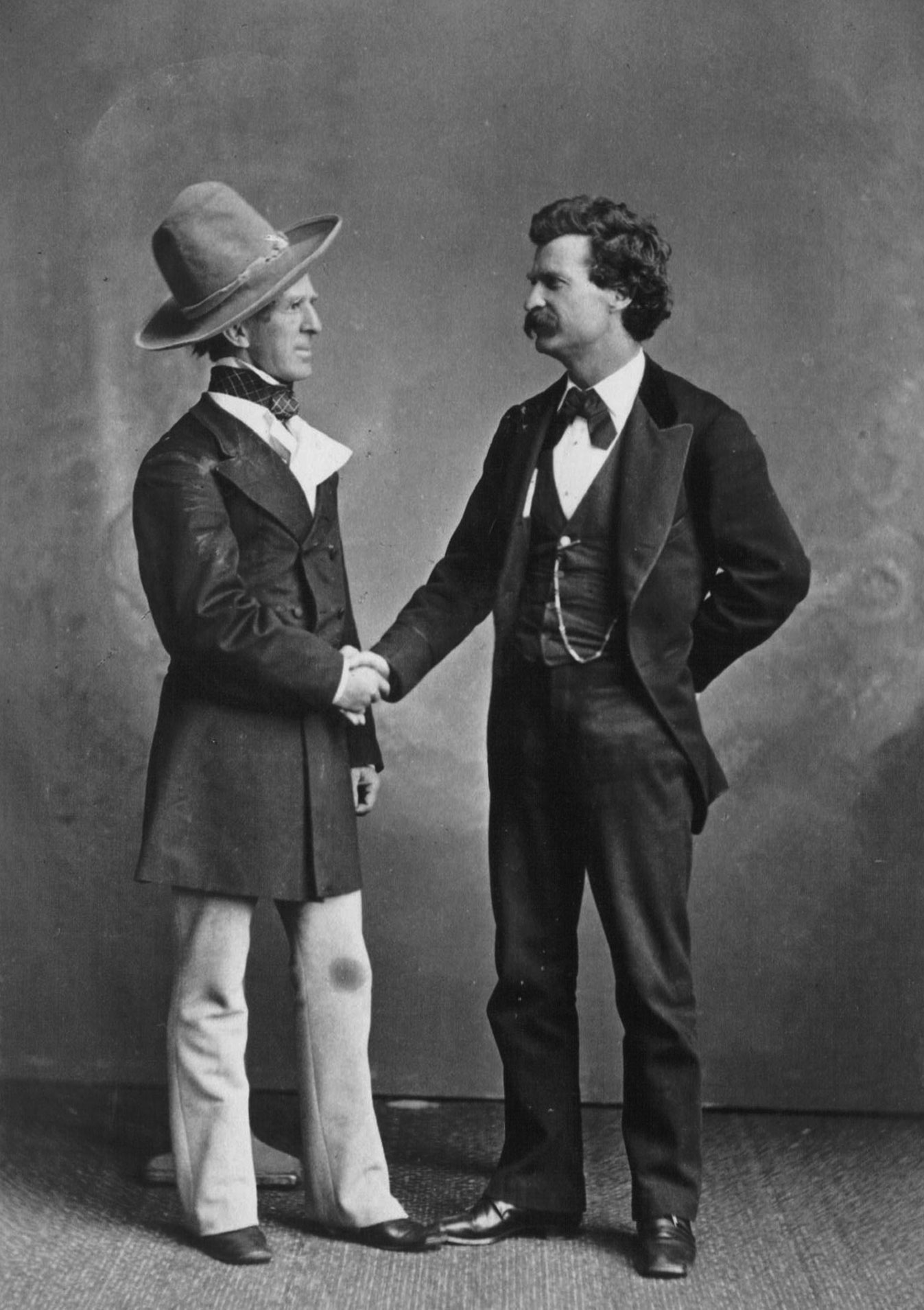
Actor John T. Raymond with Mark Twain, 1874.

- Mark Twain, American author whose 1873 The Gilded Age gave this period its name.
- Lewis Carroll, an English author who published Through the Looking Glass in 1871.
- W. S. Gilbert, dramatist and librettist known for his collaboration with composer Arthur Sullivan, which defined late-Victorian comic opera.

=== Celebrities ===
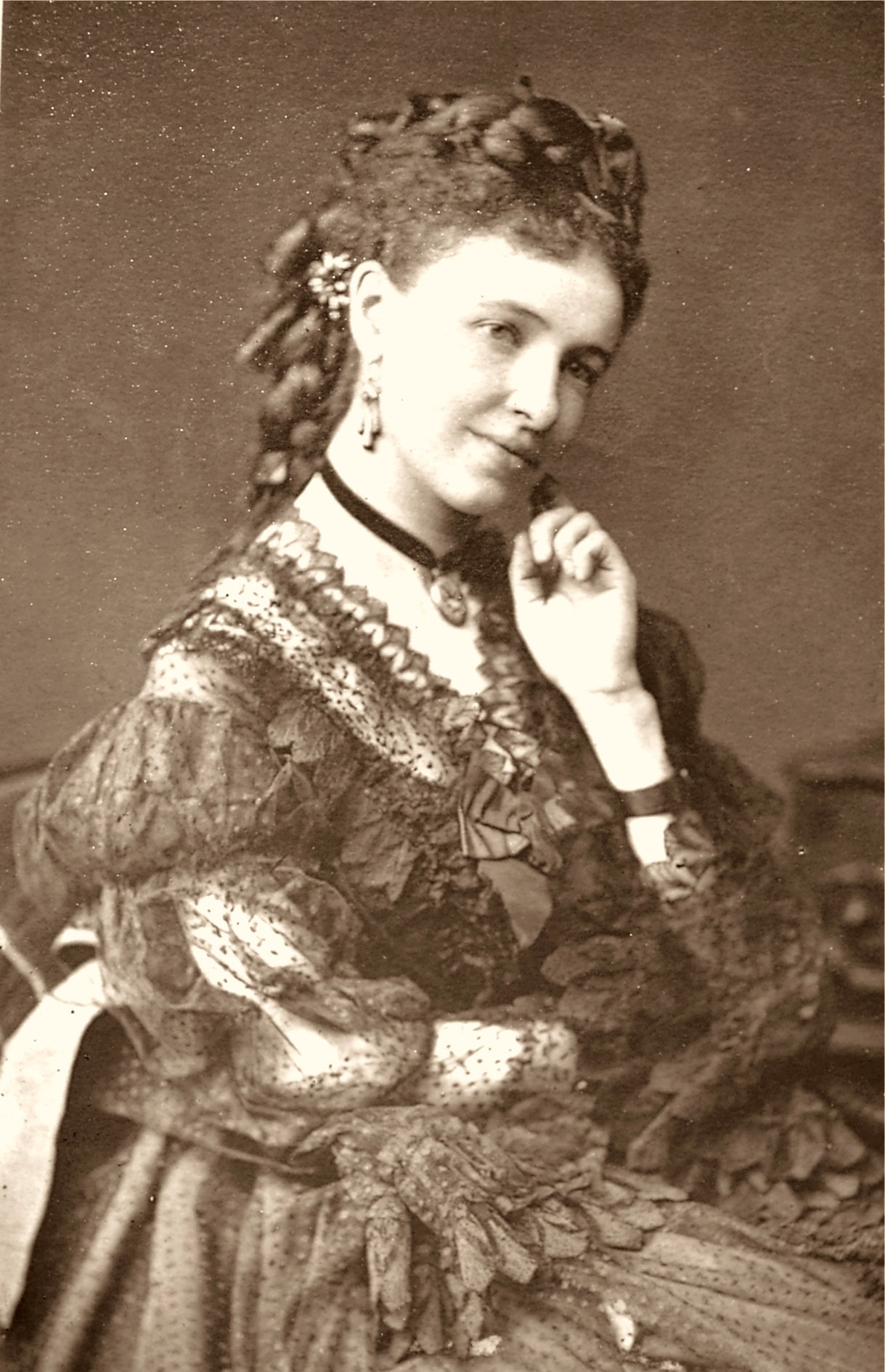
Emma Albani, 1870s.

- Christina Nilsson, Swedish operatic soprano and one of the best-known international celebrities of the decade.
- Emma Albani, a Canadian-born coloratura soprano whose career took off after an 1870 debut.
- Boulton and Park, English cross-dressing performers whose homosexuality related 1870 arrest and trial became major publicized Victorian scandal.
- Annie Hindle, variety performer and the best-known male impersonator performer of this period in the United States.
- Valtesse de La Bigne, a Parisian courtesan and celebrity associated with demi-monde glamour. She was the inspiration for the character of Nana in art and literature.
- Ichikawa Danjūrō IX, the major Kabuki actor of this decade, pivotal to its revival.
- Jane Morris, notable artists' model whose image was synonymous with Pre-Raphaelite beauty.

=== American frontier ===
- Sitting Bull, a Hunkpapa Lakota leader associated with Indigenous resistance to U.S. expansion during the decade.
- Chief Joseph, leader of Wallowa band of Nez Perce, remembered for the Nez Perce War of 1877.
- Crazy Horse, Oglala Lakota war leader associated with the Great Sioux War of 1876.
- George Armstrong Custer, U. S. Army officer whose death at Battle of the Little Bighorn became definitive to the decade's conflicts in the U.S.
- "Wild Bill" Hickok, gunfighter, scout, and entertainer who became legend after his 1876 death.
- Wyatt Earp, lawman well-known in the later part of the decade.
- Doc Holliday, gambler and gunfighter associated with frontier violence.
- Calamity Jane, Frontierswoman and professional scout, who became a notable celebrity.

== See also ==
- 1870s in sociology
- Reconstruction Era (during the decade's earlier years).
- Gilded Age (during the decade's later years).
- Long Depression
- Second Industrial Revolution
- The Great Binge (covering roughly 1870 to 1914)
