= Robert Home (officer) =

British Army officer (1837–1879)

Robert Home CB, FRGS
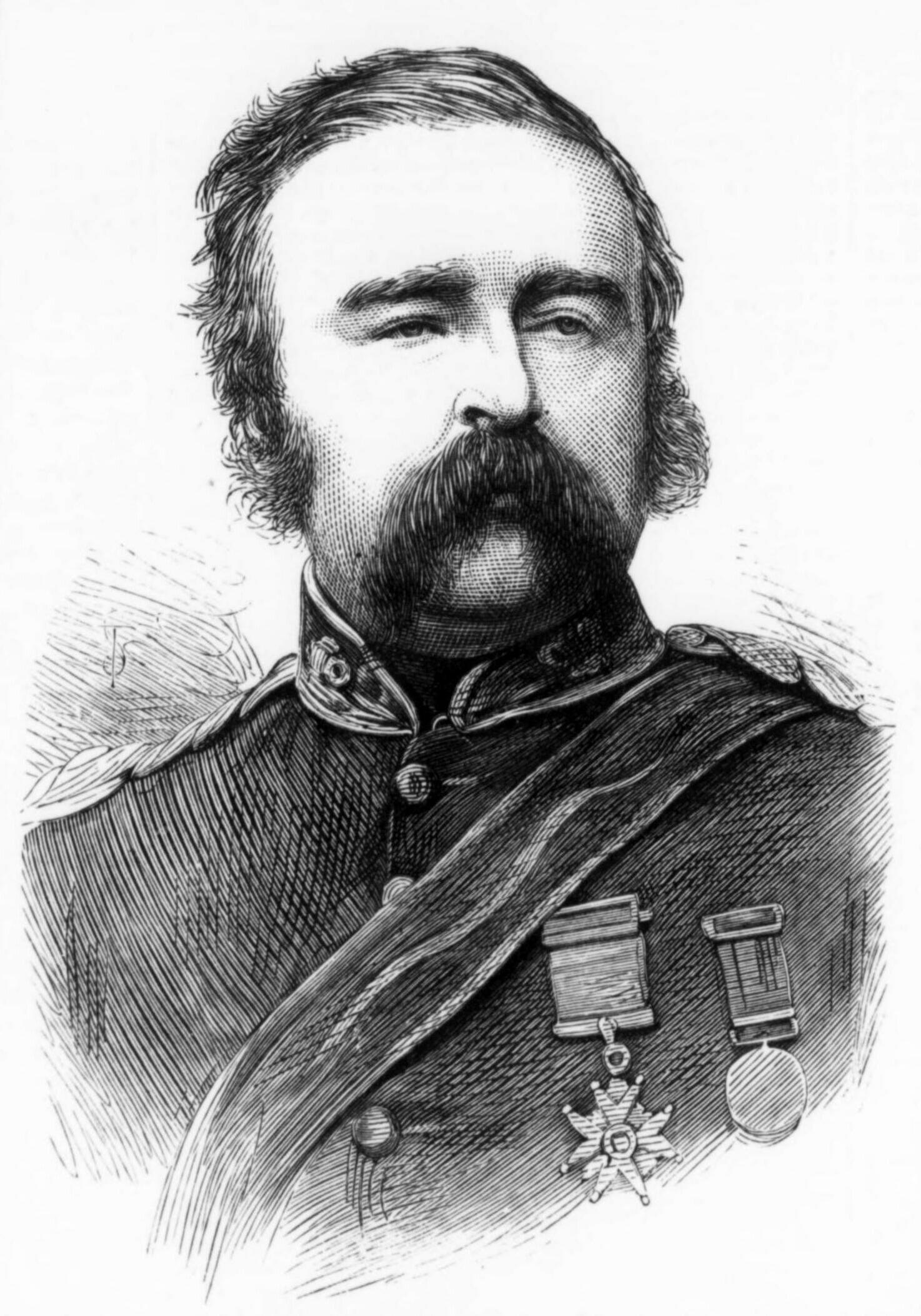
- Likeness engraved from a photograph by Bassano, The Illustrated London News, 22 February 1879
- Born: 29 December 1837; Antigua, British West Indies
- Died: 29 January 1879 (aged 41); London, England
- Military career
- Allegiance: United Kingdom
- Service: British Army; Royal Engineers
- Service years: 1856–1879
- Rank: Colonel
- Conflicts: Third Ashantee War; Battle of Amoaful (WIA)

Robert Home, CB, FRGS (29 December 1837 – 29 January 1879) was an English officer in the British Army, rising to the rank of colonel in the Royal Engineers. After ably reporting on the defence of the Canadian frontier in 1864, impressing the authorities, he was appointed deputy-assistant quartermaster-general at Aldershot in 1866 and secretary of the Royal Engineers standing scientific committee in 1870, and entered the topographical department of the War Office in 1871. Promoted to major, he was commanding Royal Engineer during the Ashantee War of 1873. He was appointed assistant quartermaster-general at headquarters in 1876, reported on the defences of Constantinople during the Russo-Turkish War, and was breveted colonel. He published A Précis of Modern Tactics in 1873.

== Life ==
Robert Home was born on the island of Antigua in the British West Indies, on 29 December 1837. He was eldest son of Major James Home, who served for some years in the 30th Regiment, and afterwards settled in Ireland as a land-agent. Robert Home was early thrown on his own resources, and when, for a short time during the Crimean War, commissions in the Artillery and Engineers were thrown open to public competition without the necessity of passing through the Royal Military Academy at Woolwich, he succeeded in obtaining one in the Royal Engineers, and was gazetted lieutenant on 7 April 1856. After serving at Chatham and in Nova Scotia, he was one of the first to join the new staff college at Sandhurst. On the conclusion of the course of study there, he was attached at Aldershot to the other three arms of the service successively, so as to complete his training for the staff. In 1862 he went to Portland, and was employed in the new defences. After his promotion to captain on 9 December 1864 he was sent to Canada, where he wrote a very able report on the defence of the frontier against American invasion, which attracted the attention of the authorities in England. The following year he was appointed to the staff at Aldershot as deputy-assistant quartermaster-general. The ability he displayed in this post led to further special employment. In 1870 he became secretary of the Royal Engineers committee (a standing scientific committee), and in the following year he was appointed to the topographical department of the War Office, which developed later into the intelligence branch.

In 1873 he was selected by Sir Garnet (afterwards Lord) Wolseley to be the commanding Royal Engineer of the Ashantee expedition, and contemporary reports and historical appraisal alike speak favourably of his conduct in that "pre-eminently engineers' and doctors' campaign". According to Robert Hamilton Vetch, Home "proved himself as able in the field as at the desk, his energy and force of character enabling him to overcome manifold difficulties". The work of opening a road from Cape Coast Castle, through the dense forest, preparing the way for the march to Coomassie, and providing huts to shelter the British troops at night in that pestilential climate, was performed by Major Home with remarkable ability and energy. He was slightly wounded at the Battle of Amoaful, where he was in the extreme front. He was one of the first into and last out of Coomassie.

For his services Home received the brevet of lieutenant-colonel, the war medal, and the companionship of the Bath. On his return from Africa he resumed his duties at the intelligence branch. The scheme for the mobilisation of the British Army and the "regulations for the organisation of the communications of an army in the field" were his work, and he rendered good service as the secretary and moving spirit of many War Office committees. On 1 April 1876 he succeeded Major (afterwards Sir) Charles Wilson as the assistant quartermaster-general at headquarters.

During the Russo-Turkish War, when there was risk of the United Kingdom being drawn into the struggle, Home's opinion was frequently sought, and great weight attached to it in military circles. Towards the end of 1876 he was sent to Turkey to report on the defence of Constantinople (Istanbul). His able despatches gained him a brevet-colonelcy, and the masterly knowledge he had acquired of the politico-military situation made him the trusted adviser of the highest authorities. In 1877 he was a second time sent to the East, on this occasion as British commissioner for the delimitation of the new boundaries of Bulgaria. He had all but completed the work when he contracted typhoid fever, and came home to die in London on 29 January 1879, at the age of forty-one. He was buried in Brompton Cemetery on 3 February. A stained-glass window was placed to his memory in Rochester Cathedral by public subscription.

== Family ==
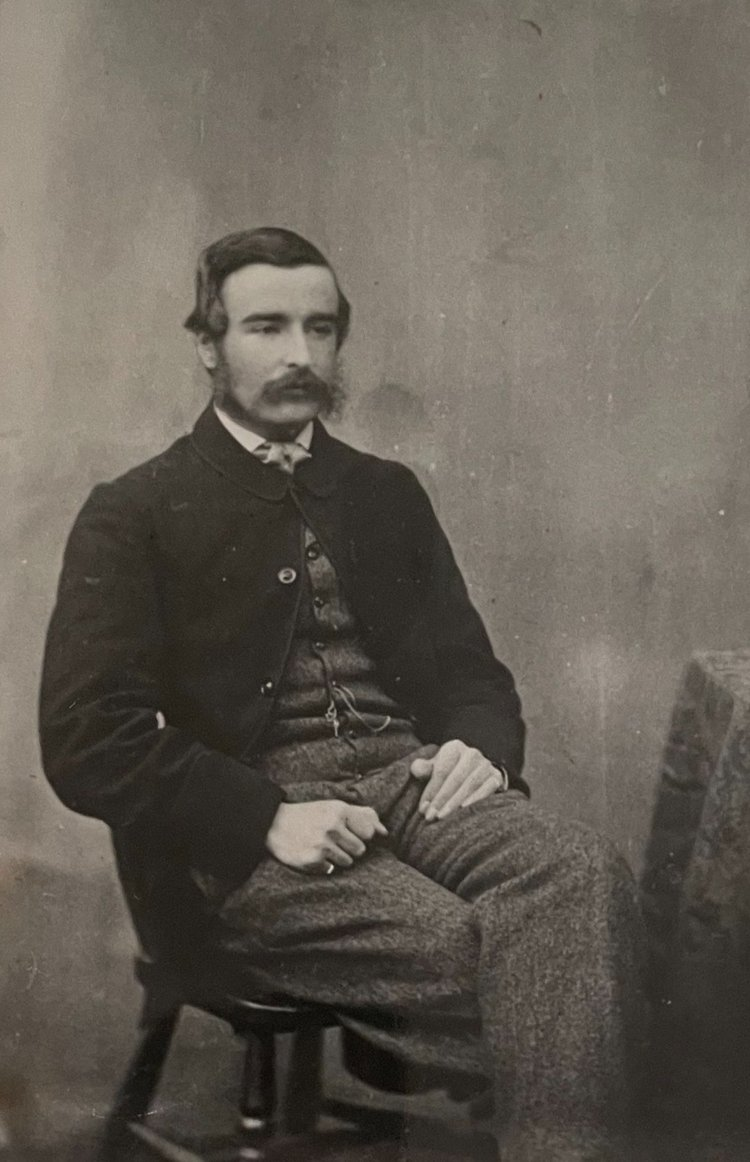
Home in civilian dress

Home married Anne Josephine, a daughter of J. Hunt, a Dublin barrister, in February 1864; she survived him with six children (four sons and two daughters). A civil-list pension of £300 per annum was conferred on his widow, in recognition of his services.

== Works ==
Home's real work (according to The Times of 31 January 1879) was known to

a comparatively limited circle, but that circle comprised most of those to whose hands the destinies of the empire have been entrusted during the last two [Gladstone and Disraeli] administrations. … It will be found that most of the statesmen who have been engaged in the difficult work of the last few years attribute no small importance to the assistance derived from Colonel Home's genius and grasp of facts.

The Pall Mall Gazette wrote of him:

A man died early on Thursday morning of whom it may truly be said that, though his services and his name were barely known to the public at all, yet during the last few years those services have been almost the first rank in political or military life.

Home achieved his first literary success in a little anonymous pamphlet on army administration. His principal work, A Précis of Modern Tactics, was at the time of its publication (1873) one of the very few English books on the subject, and it remained for some years the best, becoming an official textbook. In 1872 he translated Baron Stoffel's Military Reports and a French work on The Law of Recruiting. He was at one time a frequent contributor to the Quarterly Review, Macmillan's Magazine, and other periodicals. He was a fellow of the Royal Geographical Society, and an associate of the Society of Telegraph Engineers.

== Honours ==
- Companion of the Order of the Bath
- Ashantee Medal

== Gallery ==
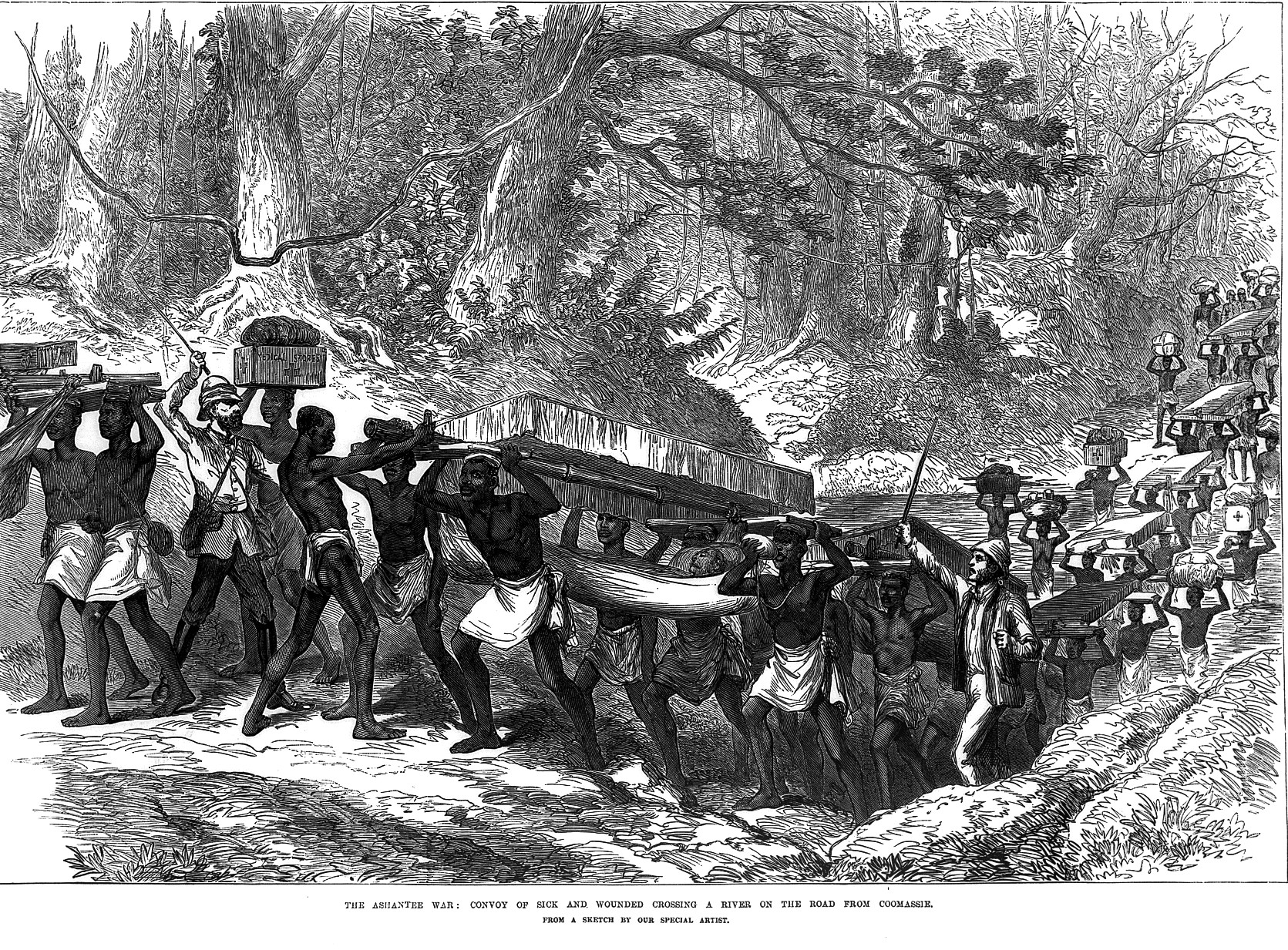
Convoy of Sick and Wounded crossing a River on the Road to Coomassie, 1874

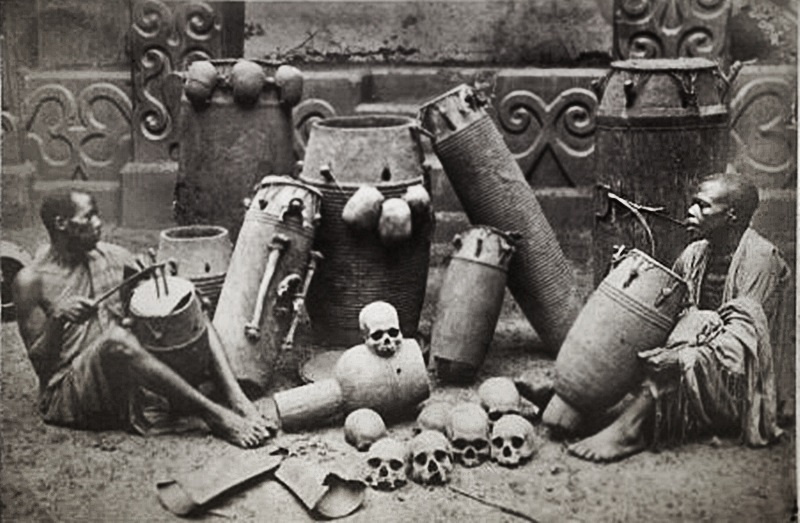
Palace of the Asantehene (Manhyia Palace) in Coomassie, 1870s

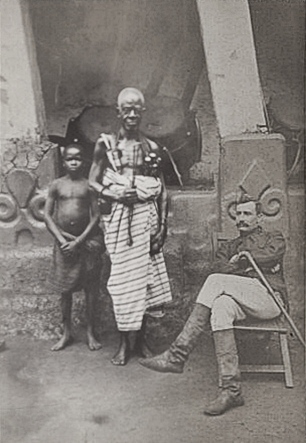
Chief Executioner & British Commissioner, Coomassie, c. 1870s

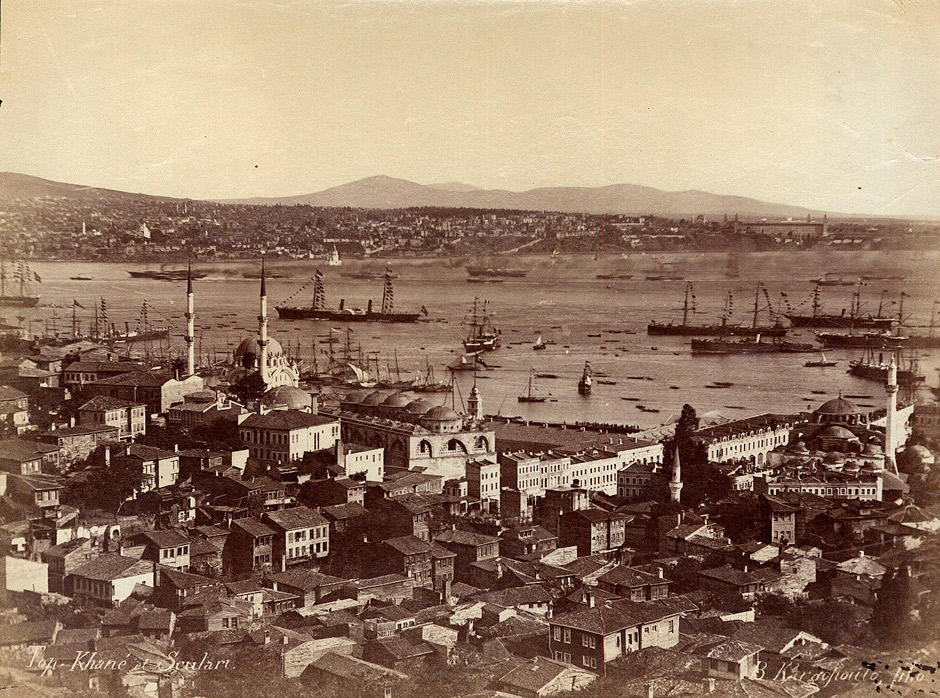
View of Constantinople, 1870s

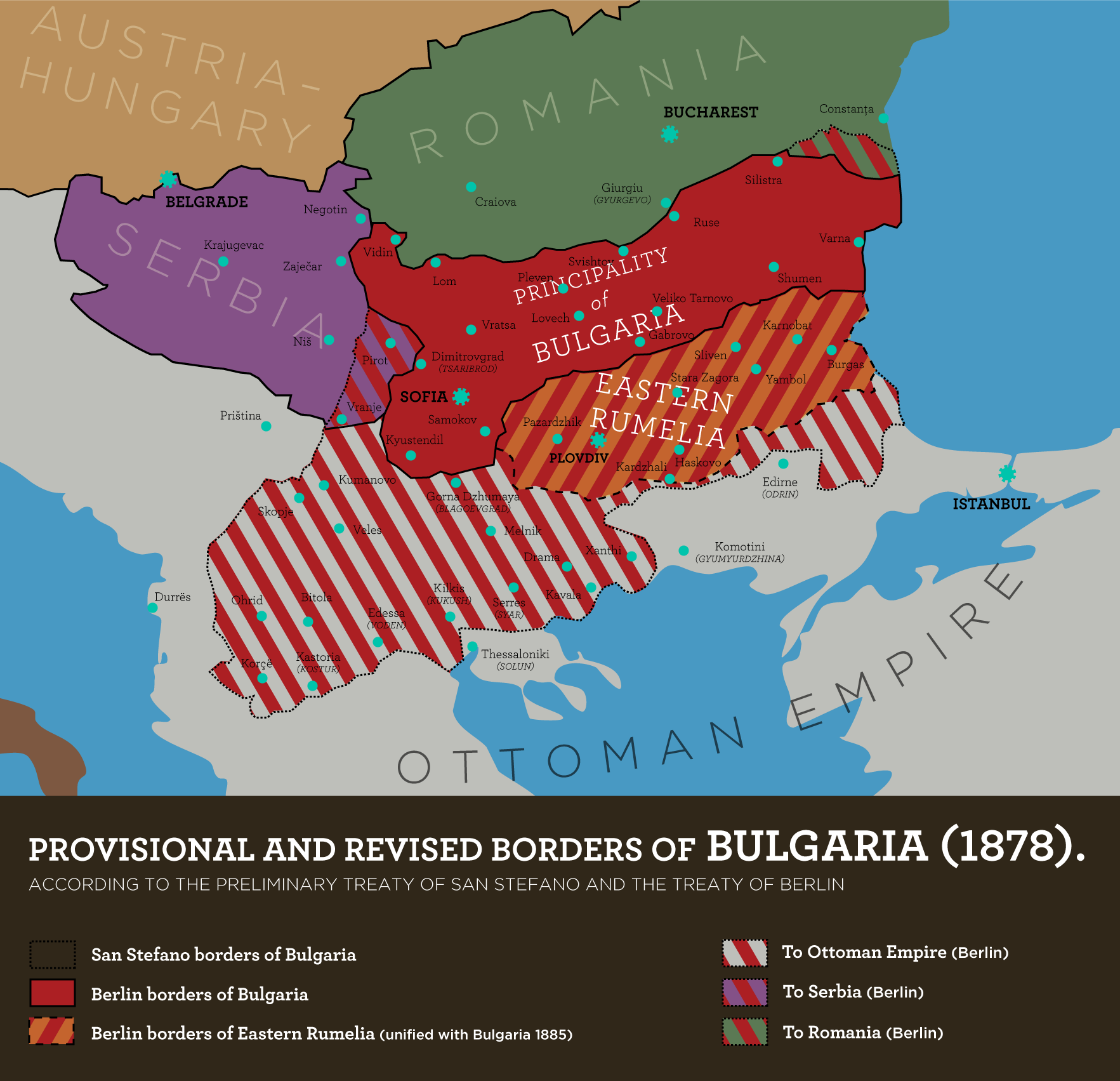
Provisional and Revised Borders of Bulgaria, 1878

== Sources ==
- Porter, Whitworth (1889). History of the Corps of Royal Engineers. Vol. 2. London: Longmans, Green, and Co. pp. 533–534.
- Reade, Winwood (1874). The Story of the Ashantee Campaign. London: Smith, Elder, & Co. pp. 221, 305, 429.
- Vetch, R. H.; Stearn, Roger T. (2004). "Home, Robert (1837–1879), army officer". Oxford Dictionary of National Biography (online ed.). Oxford University Press. doi:10.1093/ref:odnb/13648. (Subscription, Wikipedia Library access or UK public library membership required.)
- "Colonel Home, R.E., C.B.". The Times. 31 January 1879. p. 8.
- "Colonel Home". The Pall Mall Gazette. No. 4352.—Vol. XXIX. 1 February 1879. pp. 1–2.
- "The Late Colonel Home, C.B., R.E.". The Illustrated London News. No. 2071.—Vol. LXXIV. 22 February 1879. p. 185.
- "The Late Colonel Home, C.B.". The Morning Post. 4 February 1879. p. 5.

Attribution:

- This article incorporates text from a publication now in the public domain: Vetch, Robert Hamilton (1891). "Home, Robert (1837-1879)". In Lee, Sidney (ed.). Dictionary of National Biography. Vol. 27. London: Smith, Elder & Co. pp. 238–239.
