= Ashantee Medal =

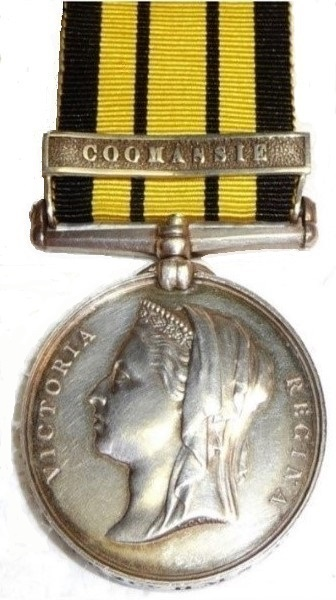
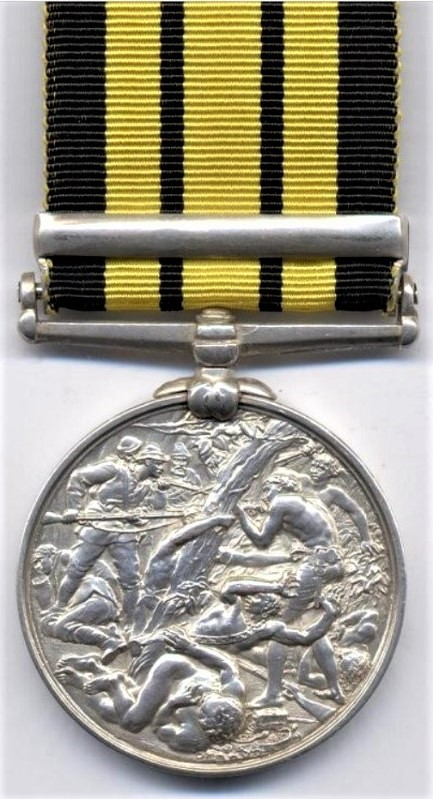
- Obverse and reverse of the medal
- Type: Campaign medal
- Awarded for: Campaign Service
- Description: Silver, 36mm in diameter
- Presented by: the United Kingdom
- Eligibility: British, Colonial and native forces
- Campaign: Third Anglo-Ashanti War
- Clasps: Coomassie
- Established: 1 June 1874
- Ribbon bar of the medal
- Related: East and West Africa Medal (1892); Central Africa Medal (1895); Ashanti Star (1896); Ashanti Medal (1901)

The Ashantee Medal is a British campaign medal instituted on 1 June 1874. It was awarded to British, Colonial and allied native forces, under the command of Major General Sir Garnet Wolseley, who were deployed against the army of the Ashanti King Kofi Karikari, during the Third Anglo-Ashanti (or Ashantee) War, June 1873 to February 1874.

Forces present included a Royal Navy contingent exceeding 3,500, two battalions of the West India Regiment, and a battalion each from the Royal Welch Fusiliers, the Black Watch and the Rifle Brigade.

== Description ==
The medal is a silver disc, 36 millimetres (1.4 in) in diameter.

Obverse: the diademed, veiled head of Queen Victoria and the inscription VICTORIA REGINA, designed by Leonard Charles Wyon.

Reverse: a scene of bush fighting between British and Ashanti in dense jungle, inspired by the campaign. The design, by Sir Edward Poynter, was later also used on the reverses of the East and West Africa Medal and the Central Africa Medal.

Ribbon: 31.7 millimetres (1.25 in) wide, with yellow with black edges and two narrow black central stripes, the same as the East and West Africa Medal.

Naming: the recipient's name and unit was engraved on the rim of the medal in capitals, filled with black, along with the years 1873–4.

== Clasps ==
COOMASSIE: awarded to those present at the Battle of Amoaful and the capture of COOMASSIE (or Kumasi), the capital, and those protecting the lines of communication north of the Prah river.

Recipients who later also qualified for the East and West Africa Medal were awarded the appropriate clasp to attach to their existing Ashantee Medal.
