= East and West Africa Medal =

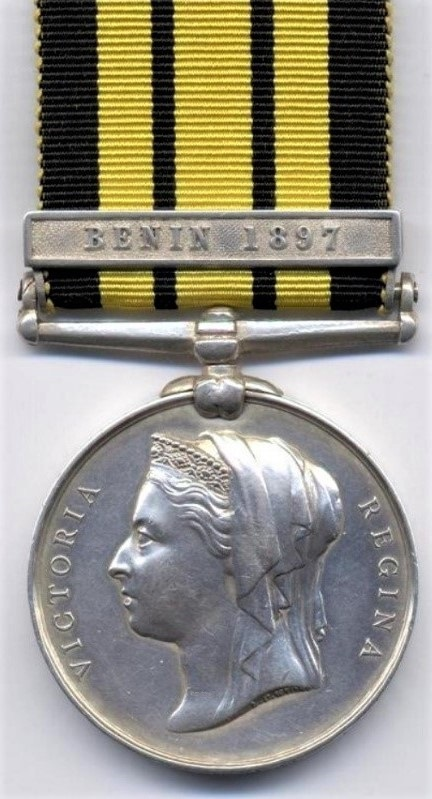
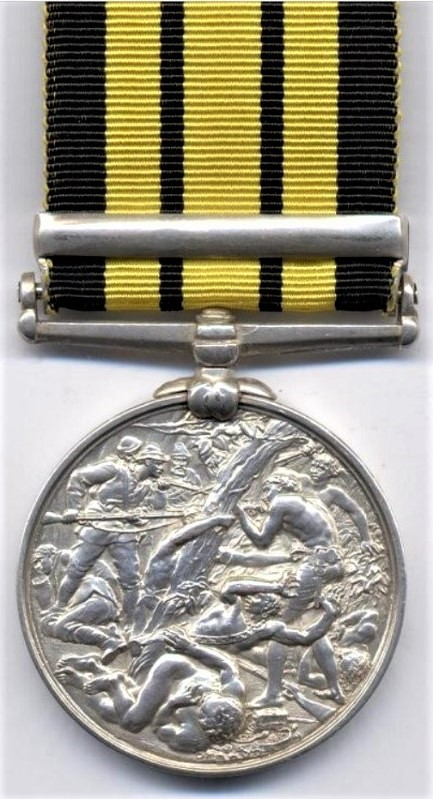
- Obverse and reverse of the medal
- Type: Campaign medal
- Awarded for: Campaign service
- Presented by: United Kingdom of Great Britain and Ireland
- Eligibility: British and locally recruited forces
- Campaign(s): East and West Africa 1887-1900
- Clasps: 1887-8; Witu 1890; 1891-2; 1892; Witu August 1893; Liwondi 1893; Juba River 1893; Lake Nyassa 1893; 1893-94; Gambia 1894; Benin River 1894; Brass River 1895; 1896-98; Niger 1897; Benin 1897; Dawita 1897; 1897-98; 1898; Sierra Leone 1898-99; 1899; 1900
- Ribbon: Yellow with black edges and 2 black stripes towards the centre

The East and West Africa Medal, established in 1892, was a campaign medal awarded for minor campaigns that took place in East and West Africa between 1887 and 1900. A total of twenty one clasps were issued.

Awards of the medal covered punitive expeditions against local tribesmen, generally in response to attacks against Europeans or neighbouring tribes, or for operations to suppress slavery. Most medals were granted to personnel from either the Royal Navy, the West India Regiment or British led local forces, including locally recruited police. No units of the British Army were present, although a number of officers and non commissioned officers received the medal while seconded to local units. Recipients of the Benin 1897 clasp included three nursing sisters.

The obverse bears a left-facing portrait of Queen Victoria with the inscription "VICTORIA REGINA".
The reverse has an image of British soldiers fighting Africans in dense jungle. The design, by Sir Edward Poynter, was also used on the reverses of the Ashantee Medal and the Central Africa Medal.
The recipient's name, rank and unit appear on the rim of the medal, using a number of different impressed and engraved styles.
The medal was issued in silver to officers and men of the British led forces. The medal with some clasps was also awarded in bronze to native porters.
The 31.7 millimetres (1.25 in) wide ribbon is yellow with black edges and two black stripes towards the centre.

== Clasps ==
A total of 21 clasps were awarded. Those who qualified for a second or subsequent clasp received the new clasp only to be attached to their existing medal. While the majority of recipients only qualified for one clasp, medals have been seen with as many as seven.

Recipients of the earlier Ashantee Medal, awarded for the Ashantee War of 1873–74, who also qualified for the East and West Africa Medal were awarded the appropriate clasp only to attach to their existing Ashantee Medal.

- 1887–8

Operations against the Yonnie people in Sierra Leone, 13 November 1887 – 2 January 1888

- Witu 1890

A punitive expedition against the Sultan of Witu of Wituland in present day Kenya, 17 – 27 October 1890

- 1891–2

An expedition in Gambia against Chief Fodeh Cabbah, 29 December 1891 – 2 February 1892

- 1892

Three separate expeditions against Tambi and Toniataba peoples in Sierra Leone and the Jebus in Southern Nigeria, 8 March – 25 May 1892

- Witu August 1893

A further expedition against Sultan of Witu, 7 – 13 August 1893

- Liwondi 1893

A small naval force sent against Chief Liwondi in British Central Africa, February – March 1893

- Juba River 1893

A small volunteer force against the Somalis in Jubaland, 23 – 25 August 1893

- Lake Nyassa 1893

A small volunteer boat party against Chief Makanjira, November 1893

- 1893–94

Two separate operations against tribesmen in Sierra Leone and Gambia, 26 November 1893 – 11 March 1894

- Gambia 1894

Naval expedition up the Gambia River, 23 February – 13 March 1894

- Benin River 1894

Naval expedition up the Benin River, August–September 1894

- Brass River 1895

Operations against King Koko in Southern Nigeria, 17 – 26 February 1895

- 1896–98

Several punitive expeditions into the Northern Territories of the Gold Coast, 27 November 1896 – 27 June 1898

- Niger 1897

An expedition to Western Provinces of Nigeria by the Royal Niger Constabulary, 6 January – 26 February 1897

- Benin 1897

A punitive column to Benin City consisting of Royal Navy and locally recruited police, 6 February – 7 August 1897

- Dawkita 1897

The defence of Dawkita in the Gold Coast against Sofa tribe slavers, 28 March 1897

- 1897–98

Expeditions in the hinterland of Lagos in Southern Nigeria, September 1897 – 14 June 1898

- 1898

Three separate expeditions against in Northern Nigeria, 1898

- Sierra Leone 1898–99

Two expeditions involving native troops and a naval brigade, 18 February 1898 – 9 March 1899

- 1899

Three separate expeditions in Southern Nigeria, February – May 1899

- 1900

Two separate expeditions against the Kaduna and Munshi people in the Northern Province of Nigeria, 4 January – 9 May 1900

Those who served in the Mwele campaign of 1895-96 on the Kenyan coast did not qualify for a clasp, but received the medal with the inscription "MWELE" and the dates "1895" or "1895-6" engraved on the rim, next to the claw of the medal.

Clasps inscribed 1896-97 and 1896-99 were authorised, but never issued.
