= Samuel McGaw =

Recipient of the Victoria Cross

Samuel McGaw VC
- Born: 1838; Kirkmichael, Ayrshire
- Died: 22 July 1878 (aged 39–40); Larnaca, Cyprus
- Burial place: British Cemetery, Kyrenia, Cyprus
- Military career
- Allegiance: United Kingdom
- Branch: British Army
- Rank: Sergeant
- Units: 42nd Regiment of Foot
- Conflicts: Indian Mutiny; Third Anglo-Ashanti War
- Awards: Victoria Cross

Samuel McGaw VC (1838 – 22 July 1878) was a Scottish recipient of the Victoria Cross, the highest and most prestigious award for gallantry that can be awarded to British and Commonwealth forces.

== Details ==
McGaw was about 36 years old, and a lance-sergeant in the 42nd Regiment of Foot (later The Black Watch Royal Highlanders), British Army during the First Ashanti Expedition when the following deed took place for which he was awarded the VC.

On 21 January 1874 at the Battle of Amoaful, Ashanti (now Ghana), Lance-Sergeant McGaw led his section through the bush in a most excellent manner and continued to do so throughout the day, although badly wounded early in the engagement.

== Further information ==
He later achieved the rank of sergeant. He died of a fever whilst serving with his regiment in Cyprus. He is now buried in The Old British Cemetery in Kyrenia, North Cyprus.

== The medal ==
Samuel McGaw's Victoria Cross is on public display in the Lord Ashcroft VC Gallery at the Imperial War Museum in London.
