= Central Africa Medal =

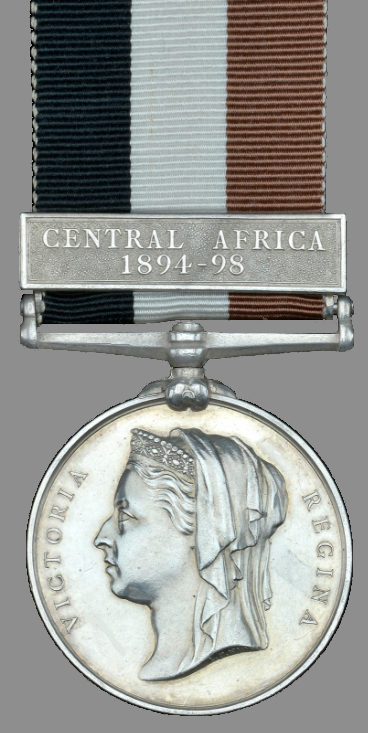
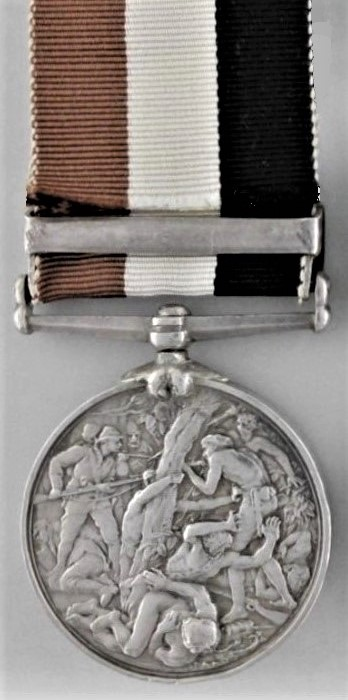
- Obverse and reverse of medal, with Central Africa 1894–98 clasp
- Type: Campaign medal
- Awarded for: Service in Eastern and Central Africa, 1891–1898
- Description: Silver or bronze, 36mm in diameter
- Presented by: the United Kingdom of Great Britain and Ireland
- Clasps: Central Africa 1894–98
- Established: 1 April 1895
- Ribbon bar of the medal

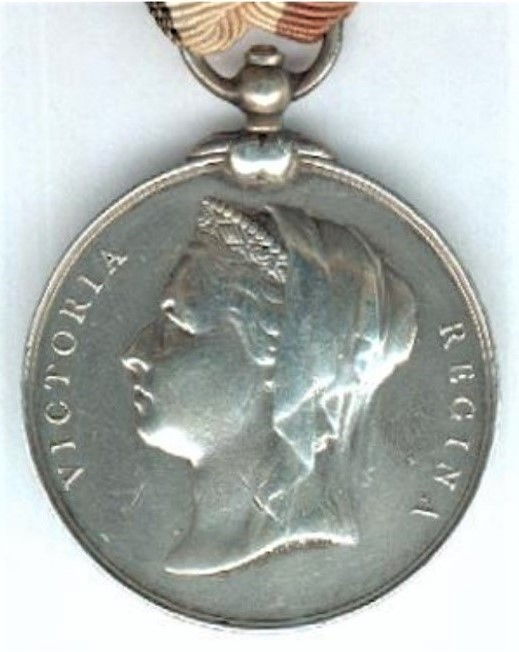
First version of medal, issued without a clasp, with ring suspension

The Central Africa Medal was a British campaign medal awarded for service from 1891 to 1894 in Eastern and Central Africa, and from 1894 to 1898 for service in British Central Africa.

== Criteria ==
Award of the Central Africa Medal was approved by Queen Victoria in Army Order No. 66, 1 April 1895. The initial award was for various military expeditions from July 1891 to June 1894, subsequently extended to the Unyoro Expedition in 1895. It was later authorised for service in British Central Africa from 1895 to 1898. The main causes of these expeditions were to suppress slave-trading or to punish raids on neighbouring tribes.

Most medals were awarded to members of the Indian Army and British-led local forces. No British Army units were present, although some British officers and non commissioned officers seconded to local units received the medal, as did a small number of Royal Navy personnel.

== Appearance ==
The medal is 36 millimetres (1.4 in) in diameter. It was issued in silver to combatants, while native porters and authorised servants received the medal in bronze.

The medal uses the same design as the Ashantee Medal and the East and West Africa Medal, although with a different ribbon.

The obverse depicts the left facing effigy of Queen Victoria wearing a diadem with a veil behind. On either side is the inscription VICTORIA on the left and REGINA on the right. The designer was Leonard Charles Wyon.

The reverse bears a scene, inspired by the Ashanti War, of British soldiers fighting the Ashanti in the jungle. It was designed by Sir Edward John Poynter.

The ribbon, 31.7 millimetres (1.25 in) wide, has three equal stripes of black, white and pale brown, also described as copper or terra cotta, worn with the black to the left when facing the wearer. The colours symbolise the troops who took part – African, European and Indian.

The recipient's name and unit were usually engraved or impressed on the rim of the medal, although some were issued unnamed.

== Suspension and clasp ==
The first version of the medal, authorised in 1895, has a swivel ring suspension and was issued without a clasp. This covered ten small Central African campaigns between 1891 and 1895, eight in the vicinity of Lake Nyassa in what is now Malawi, and two in the Unyoro and Mruli districts in Uganda.

A clasp, Central Africa 1894–98, was authorised in August 1899. When the medal was issued with the clasp, it hung from a straight bar suspension, with existing recipients of the medal having the ring suspension replaced. The medal and clasp were awarded for a number of small expeditions between 1894 and 1898 near Lake Nyassa, and one in 1897 against Chief Mpezeni in present-day Zambia.
