= Treaty of Fomena =

Alliance between the Ashantis and the British

The Treaty with the King of the Ashantees
- Signed: c. February 1874
- Location: Fomena, Ghana
- Parties: Ashanti Empire; British Empire

Treaty of Fomena was a peace treaty between the Ashanti Empire (in the time of Kofi Karikari) and the British and was formed to end the Third Anglo-Ashanti War. It was formed sometime in February of 1874. Others also claimed it was formed sometime around March, although the treaty stated that it was signed on February 13.

== Background ==
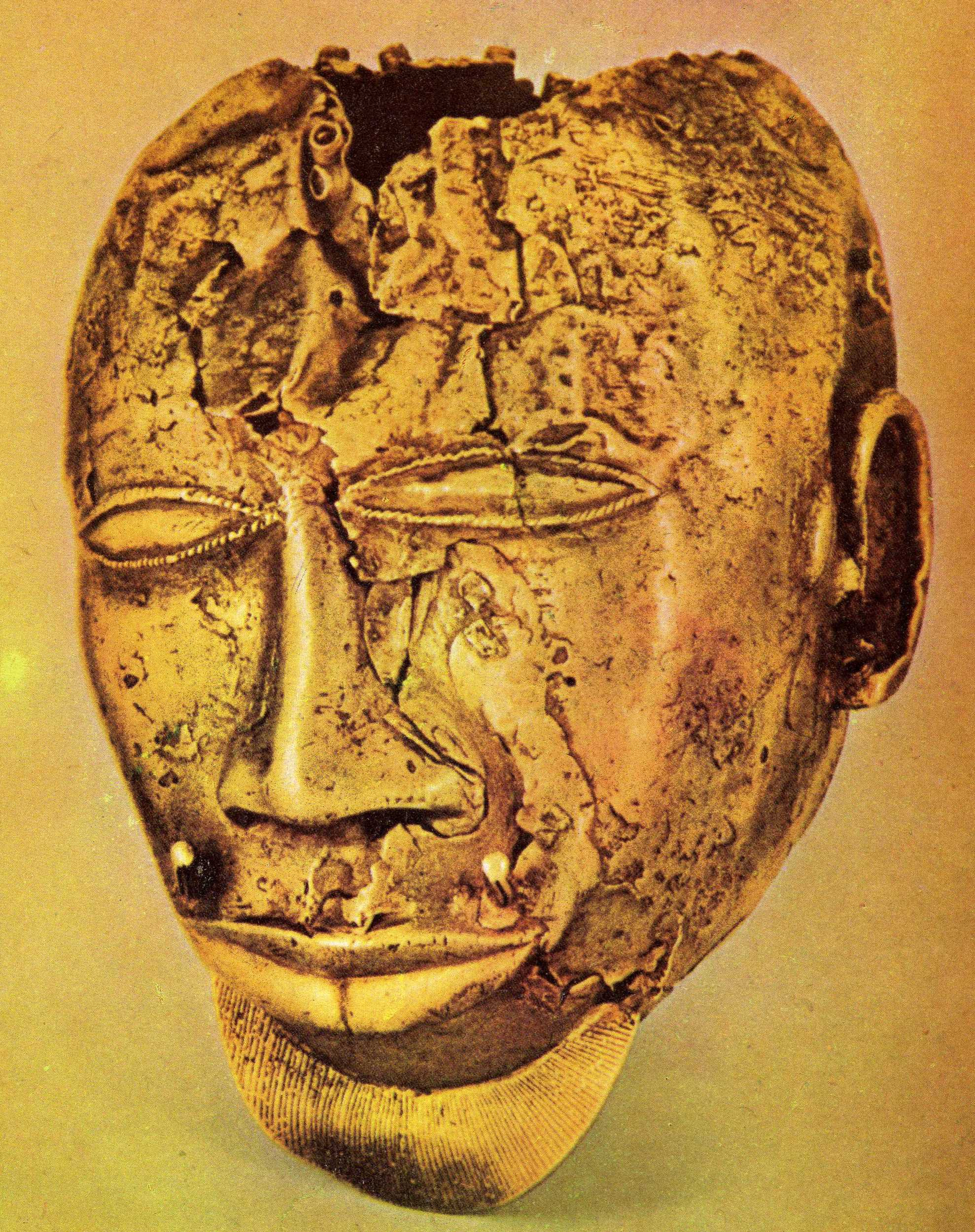
Golden trophy head belonging to the treasury of Kofi Karikari

During the 19th century, the Ashantis launched a series of invasions of the Gold Coast, growing their influence in the region. To combat this, the British launched the Wolseley expedition, commanded by General Garnet Wolseley. The Battle of Amoaful and Battle of Ordashu resulted in the retrieve of Ashanti soldiers and the takeover of Kumasi and nearby areas on 4 February 1874. A few days later on February 13, a meeting was held between the Ashanti and the British requested by Kofi Karikari calling on for peace. This would later be known as the Treaty of Fomena.

== Terms ==
The conditions of the treaty brought upon harsh treatment to the Ashanti Empire during a time of instability. An overview of the terms are listed below:

- The Ashantis promised to pay an amount of 50,000 ounces of Gold to the British.
- The Ashantis should renounce their claims on Assin, Akim, Adanse and Denkyira.
- They should also renounce claims to Elmina and other allies, and to all payments from the British Government for the use of forts.
- They are also to withdraw their troops from the South-West and other places.
- To also halt the practice of human sacrifice.

Furthermore, the treaty stated that "The King of Ashanti guarantees that the road from Kumasi to the River Pra shall always be kept open," allowing trade between the two powers.

== Impact ==
The victory by the British and the treaty put an end to the Asante's dream of bringing their power to the coastal states and also play a role in the kingdom's collapse. This also resulted in the independence of the states of Brong, Gonja, and Dagomba.

== See also ==
- Anglo-Ashanti wars
