= John Hope Smith =

English governor of the Gold Coast (died 1831)

John Hope Smith (died 15 March 1831) was an English Colonial Head of the Gold Coast (now Ghana) as Governor of the Committee of Merchants of the Gold Coast from 19 January 1817 until 27 March 1822.

"Respectably born and educated", John Hope Smith, aged fourteen, was placed by his father as a writer at Cape Coast Castle. He was appointed to be Governor in Chief of the Gold Coast aged 30. During his reign at Cape Coast Castle, the biggest fort in Fante territory, the African Company of Merchants dispatched two missions to Asante. He thought the castle could be a protective force against Ashanti, while the two diplomats sent, his nephew Thomas Edward Bowdich 1817 and Joseph Dupuis 1821 thought otherwise. In August 1817 Smith found an Ashanti man guilty of striking a sentry who had required him to remove a cloth from his shoulder. When the man was found hanged next evening, Smith had no problem believing the guard's claim that he had hanged himself, although he conceded that "it must have been by the most determined resolution that he succeeded in strangling himself.

Disagreements with Charles MacCarthy led to his resignation. A cold caught in Paris led to his early death aged forty-four.

John Hope Smith was married to an African woman from the Fante tribe. Her name was Fannie Smith. The Asante of Africa believed that they were receiving hostility from the British because Fannie was manipulating her husband against the Asante. This goes to show that African wives could have advantages as political advocates.

Government offices
Preceded by Joseph Dawson	Governor of the Committee of Merchants of the Gold Coast; 1817–1822	Succeeded by Charles MacCarthy as Governor of the Gold Coast
