= The Great Binge =

21st-century neologism

The Great Binge is a 21st-century neologism describing the period in history covering roughly 1870 to 1914.

== History ==
It is so known because of the widespread use and availability of narcotics such as opium, heroin, cocaine, morphine, and absinthe. During this period these drugs were widely available and incredibly popular among both men and women of many social classes in many parts of the world. They were marketed to both adults and children, often included in patent medicines such as cough syrups, pain relievers, and asthma medicines. They were administered to infants and women with menstrual cramps, and included in food and beverages such as Coca-Cola. Literary characters such as Sherlock Holmes were portrayed using morphine and cocaine. Holmes is described as having a particular penchant for overt injections of a 7% solution of cocaine, though only when lacking adequate mental stimulation.

The period ended with a series of laws regulating narcotic drugs in various countries and internationally. The First International Opium Convention, signed in The Hague in 1912 by 11 countries and entering into force in 1915, was the first stab at a comprehensive drug control treaty internationally and inspired domestic drug control laws such as the Harrison Narcotics Tax Act in the United States.

== Slang ==
"Binge" is 19th century slang, although the meaning has evolved. However, the specific application of the term "great binge" relative to drug use and popular attitudes towards drug use circa 1870–1914 is relatively recent. As well as its use by Bryars and Harper cited above, it was used by British author and comedian Stephen Fry to describe this period in "More Fool Me" and by academic Nicholas J. Saunders in 'The Poppy: A History of Conflict, Loss, Remembrance, and Redemption', speaking primarily of the US, to describe a 19th-century "characterised by various narcotics that were legal, widely available, widely consumed and deeply embedded in popular culture". Popular use goes back a little further. Esquire Magazine used it in this context in 2009: Dracula "appeared right in the middle of what historians call the Great Binge, a period in the late nineteenth and early twentieth centuries when cocaine and heroin use ran rampant". A Canadian psychologist, Romeo Vitelli, used the term online in a post dated September 2, 2007.
