= Annie Hindle =

British male impersonator

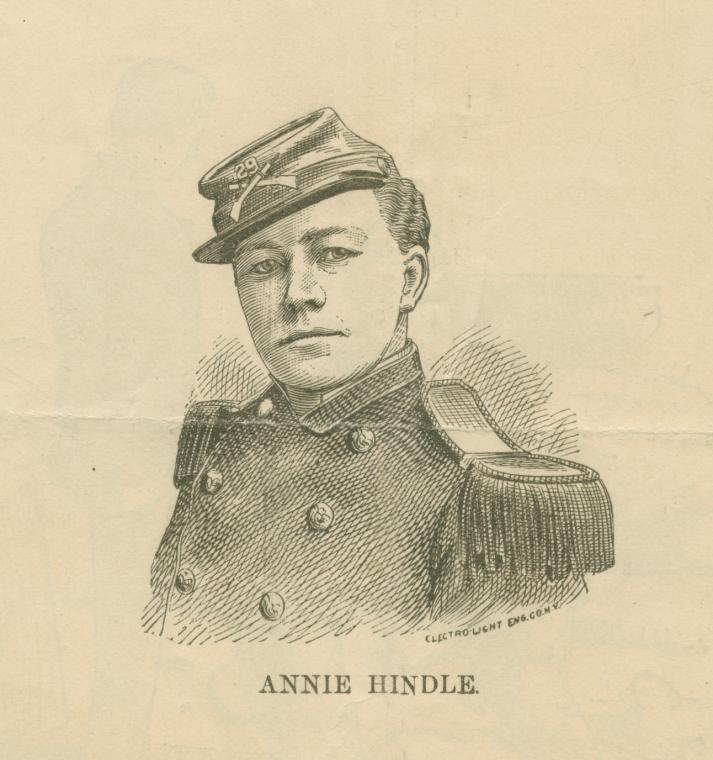
- Sketch of Hindle
- Born: 1840s England
- Died: c. 1915
- Spouses: Charles Vivian (m. 1867) W.W Long (m. 1878) Annie Ryan (m. 1886)
- Parent: Ann Hindle

Annie Hindle was the first popular male impersonator performer in the United States. Born in the 1840s in England, she and her adoptive mother, Ann Hindle, migrated to New York City in 1868. Hall performed as a male impersonator in solo acts and in minstrel shows from 1868 to 1886.

Emma Donaghue's play Ladies and Gentlemen is about Hindle after the death of her wife Annie Ryan.

== Early life ==
Annie Hindle was born in England in the mid-1840s and adopted by Ann Hindle. Annie Hindle had an affinity for both singing and wearing men's clothes at an early age and began performing on the musical stage at the age of six. Hindle and her mother moved to the United States in 1868.

== Male impersonation career ==
Hindle performed as a male impersonator on the US variety stage from 1868 and 1886 and received high reviews and steady bookings. Her skills in male impersonation astounded her audience. A review of one of her performances at the Adelphi Theater in Galveston, Texas, noted, "Annie Hindle has proved a great success. As a male impersonator her sex is so concealed that one is apt to imagine that it is a man who is singing."

== Personal life ==
Hindle's first marriage was to Charles Vivian, a ballad singer and founder of a theatrical fraternity. They married in 1868, but separated with no legal divorce six months later. Hindle later stated that Vivian had abused her during their relationship.

In 1878, some newspapers reported that Hindle married minstrel performer W.W. Long, although no official records can confirm this. In addition, the pair never lived or traveled together.

In 1886, in Grand Rapids, Michigan, Hindle married her dresser Annie Ryan while on a tour through the mid-west. Hindle dressed in male clothing and gave her name as Charles and a local Baptist minister performed the ceremony.

It appears that Hindle's marriage to Ryan was not the first time she wed a woman. Gillian M. Rodger, in Just One of the Boys: Female-to-Male Cross-Dressing on the American Variety Stage (2018) has found marriage records between a Charles Hindle and other women, which align with periods of time where Annie Hindle performed alongside these same women. It is possible that in December 1868 Hindle (as 'Charles') married Nellie Howard, a jig dancer. At the time, Hindle and Howard were performing together at the Baltimore Opera House. Another possible marriage was between Charles Hindle and Blanche Du Vere on November 23, 1870. At this time, Hindle was performing with Du Vere at Metropolitan Hall in Washington, D.C. The marriage only lasted until early 1871, but it is notable: Du Vere later changed her name to Blanche Selwyn, under which she became known as another famous male impersonator.

Hindle continued to work the stage. After Ryan's death in 1891, she married another young woman, Louise Spangehl.

In September 1900 Hindle was arrested for public intoxication in Buffalo, New York. She was let go. Her last known appearance on stage was for a week's performance at the Unique Theater in November 1904 in Indianapolis, Indiana. By 1914 she was living in Cincinnati, Ohio. Date of death and place of burial is unknown.
