= Battle of Amoaful =

1874 Third Anglo-Ashanti War battle

- Part of Third Anglo-Ashanti War
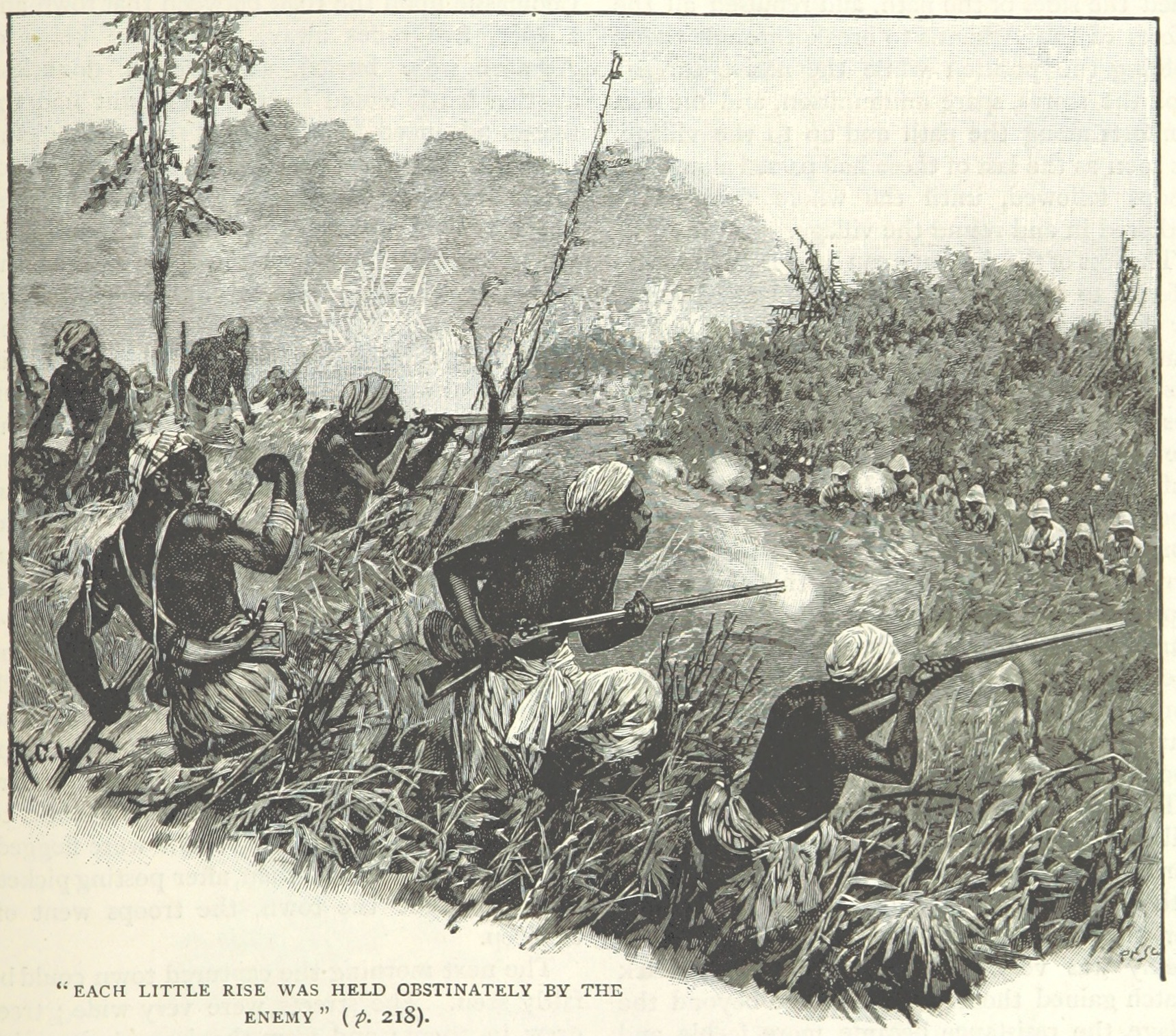
- A British illustration of the battle
Date	31 January 1874
Location	West Africa 6.4494°N 1.5640°W
Result	British victory

Belligerents
United Kingdom	Ashanti Empire

Commanders and leaders
(United Kingdom) Sir Garnet Wolseley	Bantamahene Amankwatia †

Strength
1,509 Europeans and 708 natives	Estimated at 5000 - 8000

Casualties and losses
201 men either killed or wounded	Estimated at 900 - 1,300 killed and more wounded

The Battle of Amoaful was fought on 31 January 1874 during the Third Anglo-Ashanti War when Sir Garnet Wolseley defeated the Ashantis after strong resistance. The attack was led by the 42nd Regiment of Foot. At Amoaful, one combat post-mortem pays tribute to the Ashanti commander: "The great Chief Amanquatia was among the killed. Admirable skill was shown in the position selected by Amanquatia, and the determination and generalship he displayed in the defence fully bore out his great reputation as an able tactician and gallant soldier." Lance-Sergeant Samuel McGaw was awarded the Victoria Cross for action during the battle.

== Glover and Butler's Expeditions ==
A four-pronged attack was launched towards the capital Kumasi, and while the main force of 2,500 men led by Wolseley fought in Amoafo, Captain Glover's force came from the east (towards Juaben) and Butler's force was to operate between Glover's force and the main body. A fourth column operated on Wolseley's left flank: it was led by Captain Dalrymple and comprised a force of native auxiliaries. The Asante tactics changed when they discovered that the attack was four-pronged and the main body of their army withdrew from the Adansi hills to defend at Amoafo. The Juabenhene, Asafo Agyei, disagreed with this sudden change in tactics and his force of approximately 12,000 men were left on standby, weakening the Asante position at Amoafo.
