= Anglo-Ashanti wars =

1824–1900 series of wars in West Africa

Anglo-Asante wars
- Part of the British colonisation of Africa
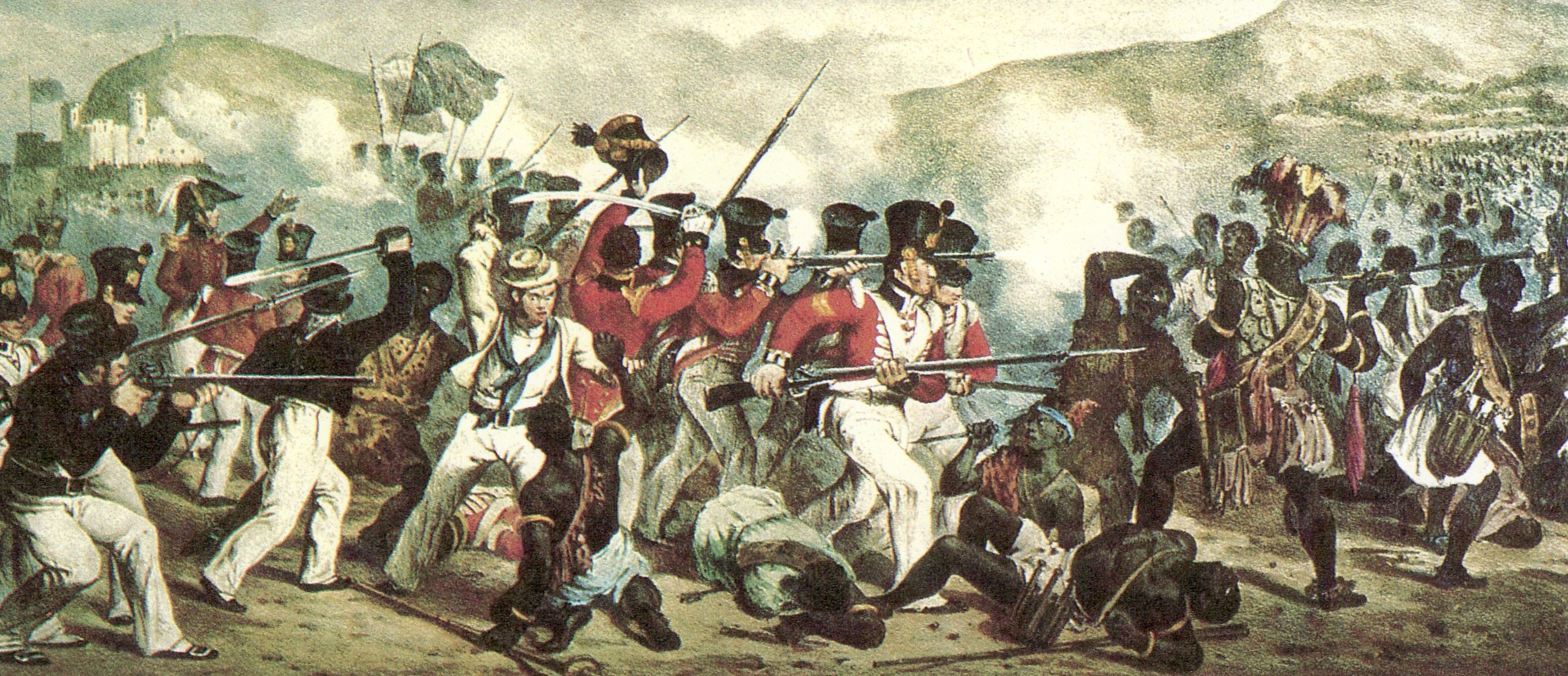
- "Defeat of the Ashantees, by the British forces under the command of Coll. Sutherland, July 11th 1824"
| Date | 1823–September 1900 |
| Location | Asanteman, West Africa (present-day Ghana) |
| Result | British victory: Establishment of the British Gold Coast; The Ashanti state became a British protectorate |

Belligerents
| British Empire (African Company of Merchants); Denmark (Danish Gold Coast) (1826) | Ashanti Empire |

Commanders and leaders
| (British Empire) Alexander Gordon Laing; (British Empire) Charles MacCarthy †; (British Empire) Francis Cunningham Scott; (British Empire) Frederick Mitchell Hodgson; (British Empire) Garnet Joseph Wolseley; (British Empire) John Hope Smith; (British Empire) Robert Baden-Powell; (British Empire) Henry Ricketts (WIA) | (Ashanti Empire) Osei Bonsu; (Ashanti Empire) Osei Yaw Akoto; (Ashanti Empire) Kwaku Dua I; (Ashanti Empire) Kofi Karikari; (Ashanti Empire) Mensa Bonsu; (Ashanti Empire) Yaa Asantewaa; (Ashanti Empire) Prempeh I |

The Anglo-Ashanti wars were a series of five conflicts that took place between 1824 and 1900 between the Ashanti Empire—in the Akan interior of the Gold Coast—and the British Empire and its African allies. Despite initial Ashanti victories, the British ultimately prevailed in the conflicts, resulting in the complete annexation of the Ashanti Empire by 1900.

== Earlier wars ==
The British fought three earlier wars in the Gold Coast:

In the Ashanti–Fante War of 1806–07, the British refused to hand over two rebels pursued by the Ashanti, but eventually handed one over (the other escaped).

In the Ga–Fante War of 1811, the Ashanti sought to aid their Ga allies in a war against the Fante and their British allies. The Ashanti army won the initial battles but was forced back by guerrilla fighting from the Fante. The Ashanti captured a British fort at Tantamkweri.

In the Ashanti–Akim–Akwapim War of 1814–16 the Ashanti defeated the Akim-Akwapim alliance. Local British, Dutch, and Danish authorities all had to come to terms with the Ashanti. By 1817, the Ashanti were expanding with an army of about 20,000, so the (British) African Company of Merchants signed a treaty of friendship that recognized Ashanti claims to sovereignty over much of the coast. The African Company of Merchants was dissolved in 1821 and the British government assumed control of the trading forts on the Gold Coast from the merchants.

== First Anglo-Ashanti War (1823–1831) ==
In 1817, a British mission visited the Ashanti capital of Kumasi and concluded with the Asantehene Osei Bonsu a treaty of "perpetual peace and harmony" which declared no "palavers" (an archaic word for disagreements) stood between the signatory powers. However, despite the treaty a major "palaver" still remained, namely the Ashanti claim to be the overlords of the entire Gold Coast and that the British should pay them "notes" (an archaic term for rent) in exchange for being allowed to occupy forts on the coast. The British refused to pay rent to the Asantehene for their forts, which led to tensions.

On 28 February 1820, another British mission headed by Joseph Dupuis arrived in Kumasi in an attempt to resolve the "palaver". Dupuis signed a treaty that was denounced at the time as "a complete sell-out" that recognised the Ashanti claim to collect tribute from the coastal peoples; renounced the British claim to protect the coastal peoples from Ashanti raids and recognised the right of the Asantehene to "eradicate from his dominions the seeds of disobedience and insubordination".

When Dupuis returned from Kumasi in April 1820, John Hope Smith, the governor of the Gold Coast, learned of the treaty that Dupuis had signed, and he repudiated the treaty. The repudiation of the treaty led to Ashanti complaints that the British were dealing in bad faith.

A major change occurred when a report written by Commodore Sir James Lucas Yeo of the Royal Navy became public. Yeo as the commander of the West Africa squadron visited the forts of the African Company of Merchants and reported to London that the forts were poorly maintained. Yeo also reported more damagingly that, despite the fact that the slave trade (though not slavery), had been abolished within the British empire in 1807, the African Company of Merchants was illegally still engaged in the slave trade. In response to Yeo's report, on 7 May 1821, an act of parliament was passed that changed the status of the Gold Coast from a proprietary colony ruled by the African Company of Merchants to a Crown colony to be ruled directly by the British government.

Initially, the Gold Coast was attached to the Crown colony of Sierra Leone with no thought for the 900-mile distance between the two. On 28 March 1821, Brigadier-general Sir Charles MacCarthy arrived at Cape Coast Castle as the new governor with a mandate to shut down some of the more indefensible coastal forts; to ensure that the remaining forts followed the law by only trading with British ships; and to suppress the still flourishing slave trade. MacCarthy was new to the Gold Coast, and the unwillingness of the merchants to co-operate with the man who had been sent to replace their rule left him isolated and thus very ignorant of the affairs of the Gold Coast. MacCarthy during his tenure as a governor was more interested in seeking to have the British government buy out the remaining Dutch and Danish forts on the Gold Coast and trying to stop the traders of the forts from doing business with American ships, than in relations with the Ashanti. By the 1820s, the British had decided to support the Fante against Ashanti raids from inland. Economic and social friction played their part in the causes for the outbreak of violence.

The immediate cause of the war happened when a group of Ashanti kidnapped and killed an African sergeant of the Royal African Colonial Corps (RACC) on 1 February 1823. Freeman writes that there is no evidence the King of Ashanti was responsible for the attack as it was caused by a dispute between the sergeant and those who killed him. Sergeant Kujo Otetfo of the RACC became involved in a verbal dispute with an Ashanti trader and in the words of the British doctor Walton Claridge "grossly abused the King of Ashanti, and it was this insignificant event that provided the spark that set the whole country in a blaze of war". Otetfo taunted the trader by saying "Kormante ne Memeneda" (English: Cormantine and Saturday), referring to the Battle of Cormantine in 1731 that saw the Ashanti king slain, a defeat that was considered so humiliating for the Ashanti that it was a capital offence to even mention the battle within their kingdom. Otetfo was kidnapped by an Ashanti war party a few weeks later, and was beheaded on 2 February 1823.

The British historian Ivor Wilks adds that the attack was carried out under the commands of the War Party and not Asantehene Osei Bonsu as they executed the Sergeant for insulting the Asantehene. A small British force sent inland by MacCarthy was led into a trap which resulted in the force being ambushed, suffering 10 men killed and 39 wounded before retreating. The Ashanti tried to negotiate but MacCarthy rejected Ashanti claims to Fante areas of the coast and resisted their overtures.

MacCarthy returned from Sierra Leone when he learned of Otetfo's beheading and landed at Cape Coast Castle. Dr. Claridge wrote: "His journey was a triumphal progress. The Anamabos and the people of the other villages through which he passed hailed him with enthusiasm". Despite the way that the force that he sent inland had been annihilated, MacCarthy reported the battle to London as a victory. MacCarthy wrote to the Colonial Secretary, Lord Bathurst his belief that the Ashanti were "blustering" and "they were not prepared for war, but depended solely upon the terror of their name to bring us to seek a compromise, and I suppose to extort from the native people under our fort... a contributions of six hundred ounces of gold". MacCarthy asked for and received permission to have the Royal African Colonial Corps redeployed from the Cape Colony (modern south-western South Africa) to the Gold Coast. The RACC, made up of six companies of white soldiers and three companies of black soldiers, was a "disciplinary corps" of the British Army meant to punish soldiers of "bad character" who had been convicted of criminal offences. Though of poor quality, it was the only British Army unit available for operations in West Africa.

MacCarthy led a force from the Cape Coast in two columns; the first, under his direct command, consisted of roughly 80 RACC troops, 170 militiamen of the Cape Coast Militia and 240 Fante warriors. Moving out to confront the British were an Ashanti force of 10,000 men armed with Dane guns. The Ashanti force were well disciplined as the American anthropologist Robert B. Edgerton noted that they: "marched in perfect order, their guns carried at exactly the same angle, before they turned toward the enemy and fired volleys on command, the only African army that was known to do so". The Ashanti generally did not have bullets for their muskets and used nails instead, which proved to be an effective substitute. Upon hearing that the Ashanti army was on the march, MacCarthy unwisely divided his forces. MacCarthy failed to understand until it was too late for him that the Ashanti force that he was facing was the main Ashanti army instead of a vanguard as he assumed. He was in the first column, which lost contact with the second column before encountering the main Ashanti army on 22 January 1824 at the Battle of Nsamankow. The porters accompany MacCarthy's force quickly fled after hearing gunfire and encountering deserters, and though four cases of supplies were delivered by porters only one contained ammunition. The Fante warriors soon fled, while the RACC and Cape Coast Militia troops made a determined last stand but soon ran out of ammunition and were overrun, with only 20 of the 250 regulars and militiamen managing to escape. MacCarthy, Ensign Wetherell, and his secretary Williams attempted to fall back. MacCarthy was wounded, however, and killed by a second shot shortly thereafter. Ensign Wetherell was killed while defending MacCarthy's body. Williams was taken prisoner. He was spared death when an Ashanti sub-chief recognised him due to a favour Williams had shown him previously. Williams was held prisoner for several months in a hut that also held the severed heads of MacCarthy and Wetherell.

MacCarthy's skull was rimmed with gold and was purportedly used as a drinking-cup by Ashanti rulers. An eye-witness stated that he "saw ensign Wetherell, who appeared also to have been wounded, lying close to MacCarthy. Some of the Ashantis were attempting to cut off his head, and had already inflicted one gash on the back of his neck; luckily at this crisis an Ashanti of some authority came up and recognising Williams, from whom he had received some kindness, withheld the hand of the assailant. On Williams's recovering his senses, he saw the headless trunks of MacCarthy, Buckle, and Wetherell. During his captivity he was lodged under a thatched shed in the same rooms as the heads which, owing to some peculiar process, were in a perfect state of preservation."

Some weeks later, a larger British force made up of White and Native troops came to a standstill with the same Ashanti army that had defeated MacCarthy's force. The British army withdrew back to the coast with 176 dead and 677 men wounded.

Major Alexander Gordon Laing returned to Britain with news of the defeat. The Ashanti swept down to the coast, but disease forced them back. The new governor of the Gold Coast, John Hope Smith, started to gather a new army, mainly comprising natives, including Denkyiras and many other traditional enemies of the Ashanti. In August 1826, the governor heard that the Ashanti were planning on attacking Accra. A defensive position was prepared on the open plain about 15 kilometres (10 mi) north of Accra and the 11,000 men waited.

On 7 August, the Ashanti army appeared and attacked the centre of the British line where the best troops were held, which included some Royal Marines, the Cape Coast Militia and a battery of Congreve rockets. The battle dissolved into hand-to-hand fighting but the Ashanti force were not doing well on their flanks whilst they looked like winning in the centre. Then the rockets were fired. The novelty of the weapons, the explosions, rocket trails, and grievous wounds caused by flying metal shards caused the Ashanti to fall back. Soon they fled leaving thousands of casualties on the field. In 1831, the Pra River was accepted as the border in a treaty.

== Second Anglo-Ashanti War (1863–1864) ==
The war took place between 1863 and 1864. Peace existed for more than 30 years, with both forces sticking to their side of the border. The factor that frequently sparked Ashanti conflicts was not adhering to understood or established territory borders. In the decade prior, Britain had been in a number of conflicts and skirmishes. In the 1860s alone the crown was actively involved in the bloodless Pig War dispute against the U.S. over the Canada–United States border. They would team with the U.S. and other colonial powers against realms in Japan during 1863. Additionally, there was a dispute in New Zealand against the Maori.

In 1863, a large Ashanti force crossed the Pra River in search of a fugitive, Kwesi Gyana. British, African and Indian troops responded, but neither side claimed victory as illness took more casualties on both sides than the direct combat. The war ended in 1864 and the result was a stalemate.

== Third Anglo-Ashanti War (1873–1874) ==
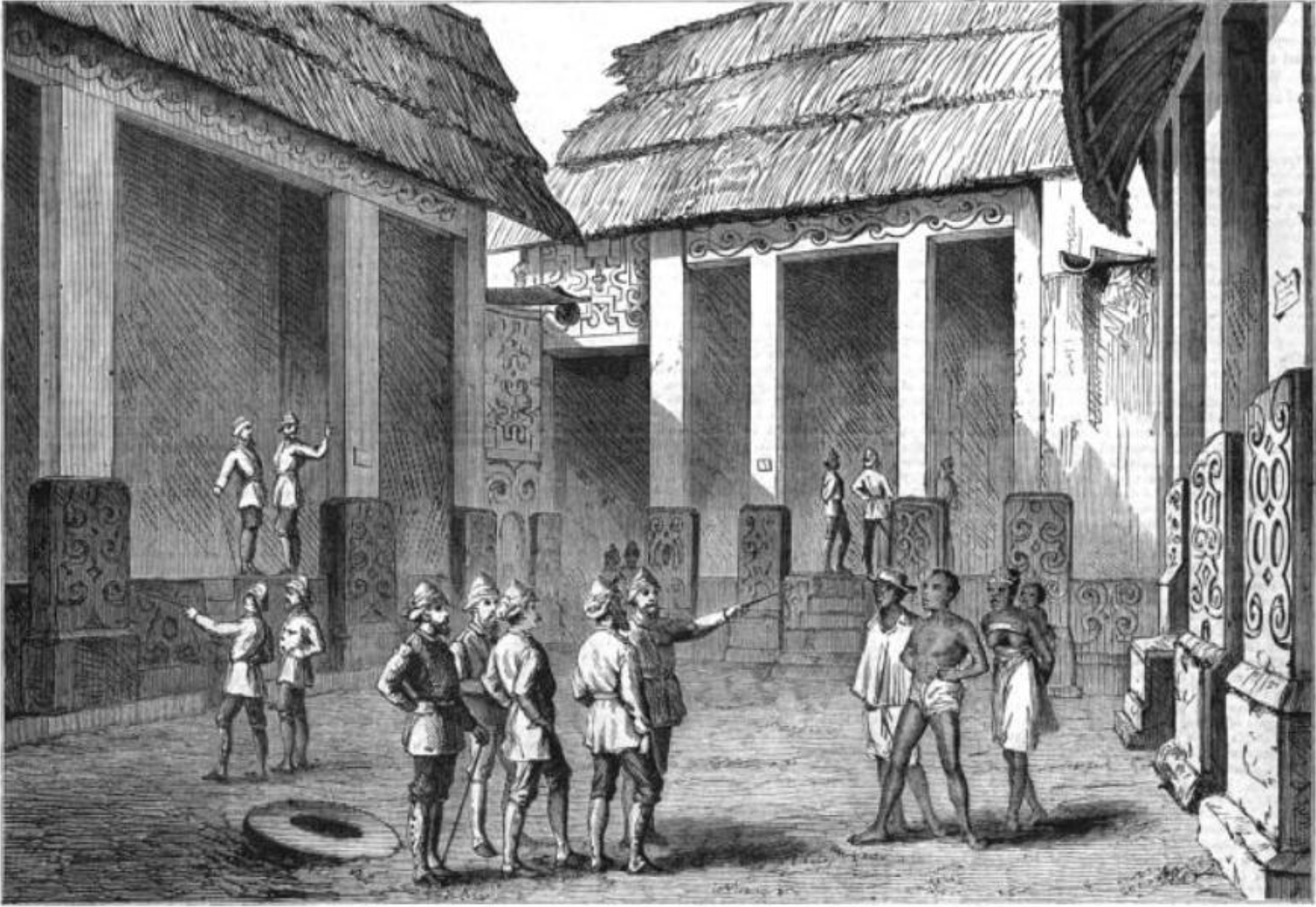
English officers selecting quarters in the chief's palace at Fomena in 1874

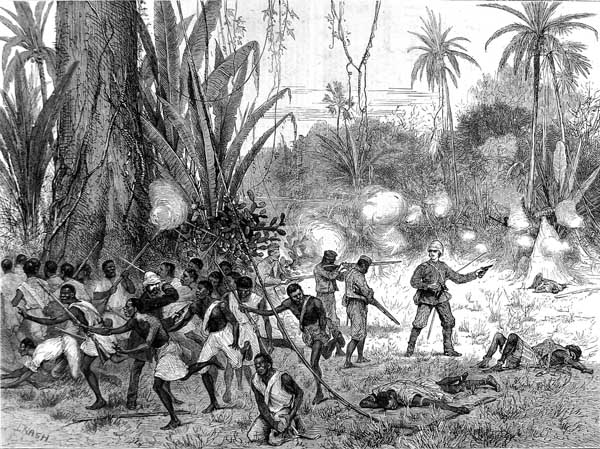
A bush fight, Third Anglo-Ashanti War. The Graphic 1874

The Third Anglo-Ashanti War, also known as the "First Ashanti Expedition", lasted from 1873 to 1875. In 1869, a German missionary family and a Swiss missionary had been taken from Togo to Kumasi. They were still being held in 1873.

The British Gold Coast was formally established in 1867 and in 1872, Britain expanded their territory when they purchased the Dutch Gold Coast from the Dutch, including Elmina which was claimed by the Ashanti. The Dutch had signed the Treaty of Butre in 1656 with the Ahanta. The treaty's arrangements proved very stable and regulated Dutch-Ahanta diplomatic affairs for more than 213 years. This all changed with the sale of the Dutch Gold Coast. The Ashanti invaded the new British protectorate.

General Garnet Wolseley was sent against the Ashanti with 2,500 British troops and several thousand West Indian and African troops (including some Fante) and subsequently became a household name in Britain. The war was covered by war correspondents, including Henry Morton Stanley and G. A. Henty. Military and medical instructions were printed for the troops. The British government refused appeals to interfere with British arms manufacturers who sold to both sides.

Road building

Wolseley was appointed on 13 August 1873 and went to the Gold Coast to make his plans before the arrival of his troops in January 1874. On 27 September 1873, a team of Royal Engineers landed at Cape Coast Castle. Their job was to expand the single file track that led to Kumasi, 160 miles (260 km) away, into a road that was suitable for troop movements. At the end of each day's march, roughly every 10 miles (16 km) a fortified camp would be built with 70 feet (21 m) long huts inside a stockade in an area that had been cleared of trees and undergrowth to provide some protection against hostile natives.

Bridges were built across streams using trees, bamboo and creepers for ropes and a major bridge across the 63 yards (58 m)-wide Pra River was built using pre-manufactured pieces brought from Chatham, England. In total, 237 bridges would be built. Some of the camps were larger—Prahsue, next to the bridge had a medical hut and a tower on a mound, stores, forge, telegraph office and post office. It was stocked with 400 tons of food and 1.1m rounds of ammunition. The labour was supplied locally. To start the workers did not know how to use European tools and were liable to vanish into the forest if they heard a rumour that the Ashanti were nearby. Sickness, despite taking quinine daily, claimed the European engineers. Even so, the road progressed. By 24 January a telegraph line reached Prahsue.

West Africa c. 1875

The first troops arrived in late December and on 1 January 1874 started marching along the road to the front, half a battalion at a time. The troops comprised a battalion each from the Black Watch, the Rifle Brigade and Royal Welch Fusiliers, along with the 1st and 2nd West India Regiments, a Naval Brigade, two native regiments, Royal Artillery, Royal Engineers and Royal Marines. By 29 January, the road was more than half completed and they were close to Ashanti outposts. Skirmishing between the two forces began. Wolseley prepared to fight a battle.

Battle

The Battle of Amoaful was fought on 31 January. A road was cut to the village and the Black Watch led the way, forming square in the clearing with the Rifle Brigade, while flanking columns moved around the village. With the pipes playing "The Campbells Are Coming" the Black Watch charged with bayonets and the shocked Ashantis fled. The flank columns were slow moving in the jungle and the Ashantis moved around them in their normal horseshoe formation and attacked the camp 2 miles (3.2 km) to the rear. The Royal Engineers defended themselves until relieved by the Rifle Brigade. Although there was another small battle two days later, the Battle of Ordashu, the action had been decisive and the route to Kumasi was open. There were three killed and 165 wounded Europeans, one killed and 29 African troops wounded.

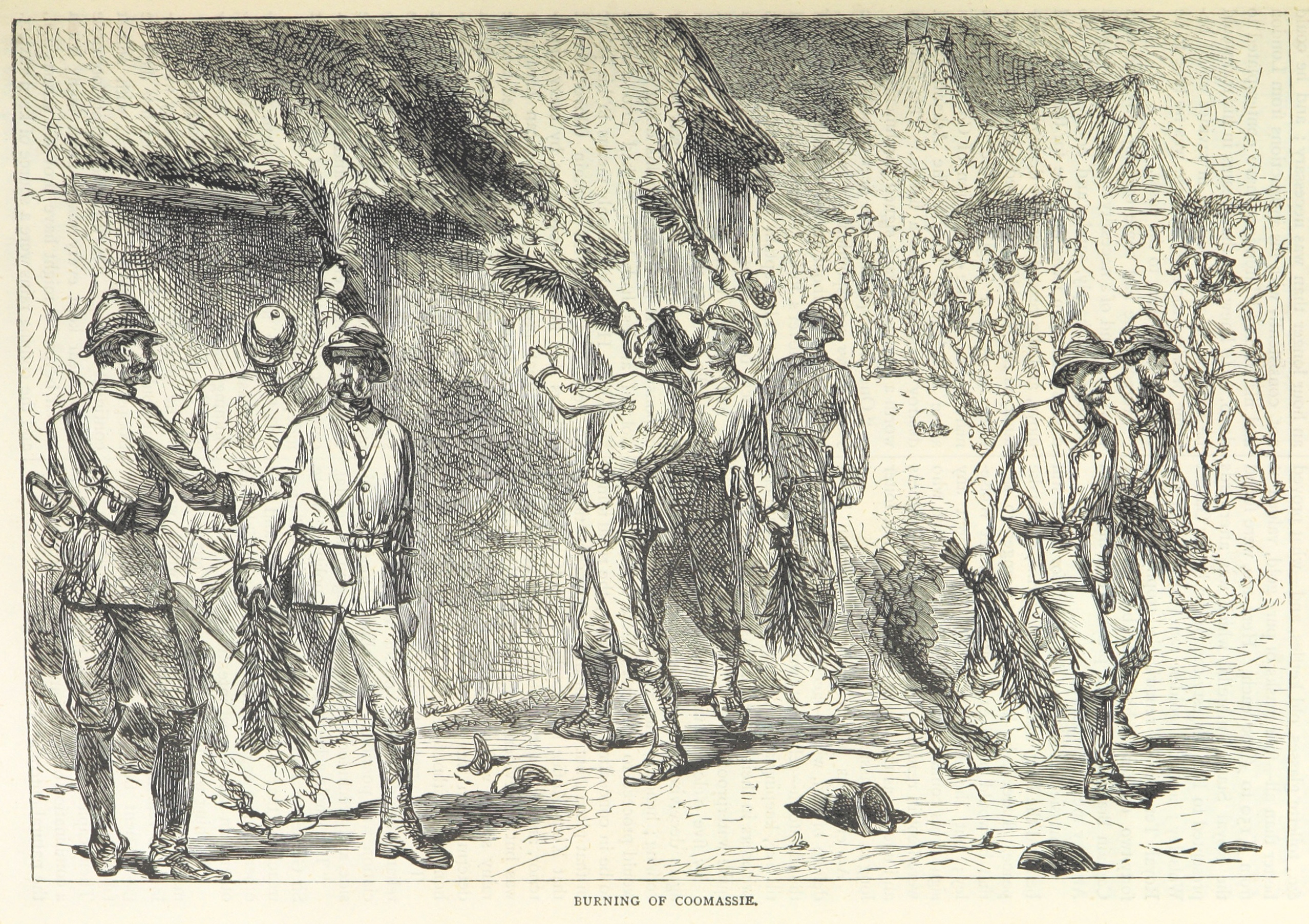
The 1874 burning of Kumasi

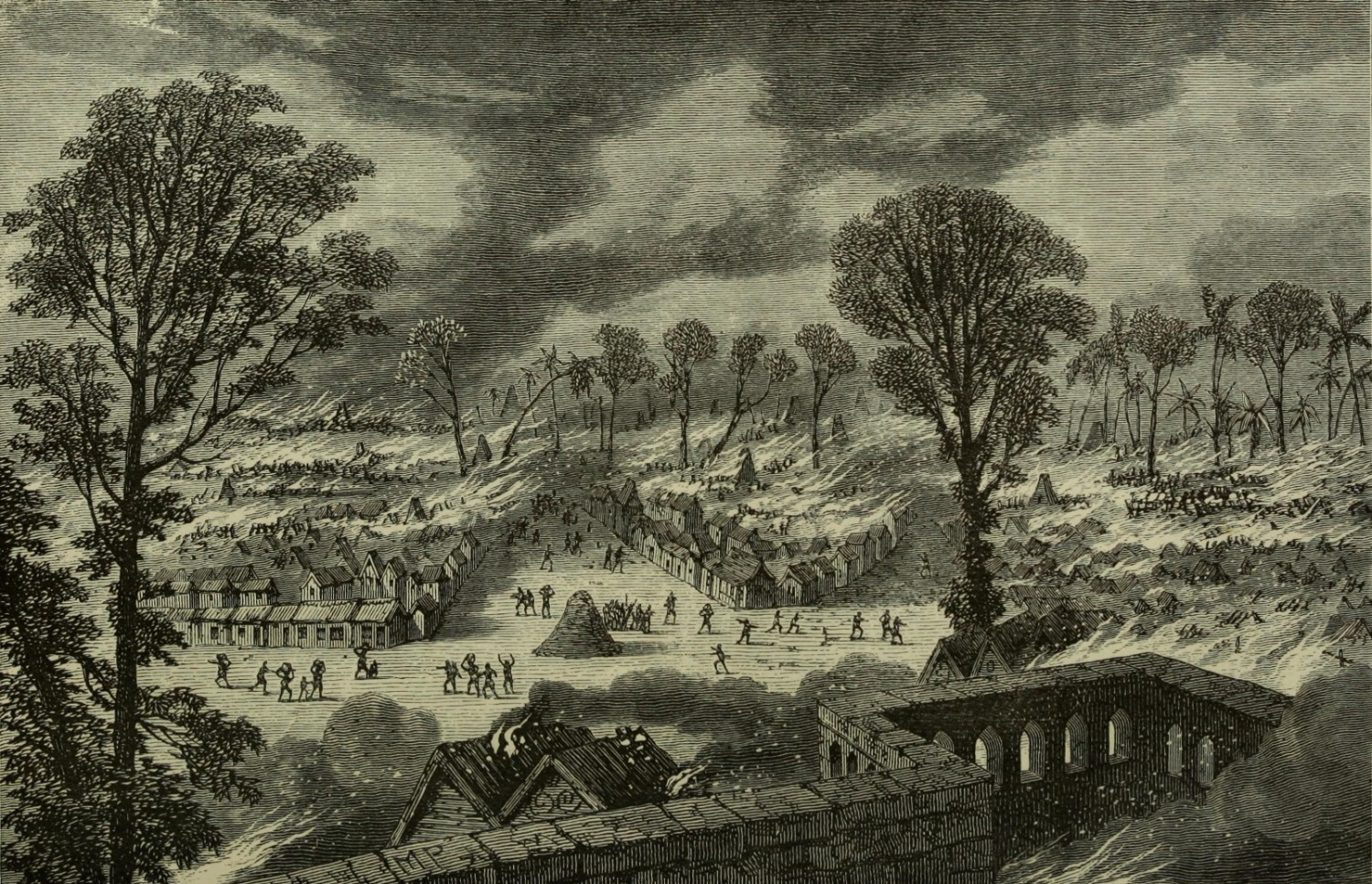
Burning of Kumasi depicted by Henry Morton Stanley

The capital, Kumasi, was abandoned by the Ashanti when the British arrived on 4 February and was briefly occupied by the British. They demolished the royal palace with explosives, leaving Kumasi a heap of smouldering ruins. The British were impressed by the size of the palace and the scope of its contents, including "rows of books in many languages".

The Ashanti signed the Treaty of Fomena in July 1874 to end the war. Among articles of the treaty between Queen Victoria and Kofi Karikari, King of Ashanti were that "The King of Ashanti promises to pay the sum of 50,000 ounces of approved gold as indemnity for the expenses he has occasioned to Her Majesty the Queen of England by the late war..." The treaty also required an end to human sacrifice and stated that "There shall be freedom of trade between Ashanti and Her Majesty's forts on the [Gold Coast], all persons being at liberty to carry their merchandise from the Coast to Kumasi, or from that place to any of Her Majesty's possessions on the Coast." Furthermore, the treaty stated: "The King of Ashanti guarantees that the road from Kumasi to the River Pra shall always be kept open..." Wolseley completed the campaign in two months, and re-embarked for home before the unhealthy season began.

Wolseley was promoted and showered with honours. British casualties were 18 dead from combat and 55 from disease (70%), with 185 wounded.

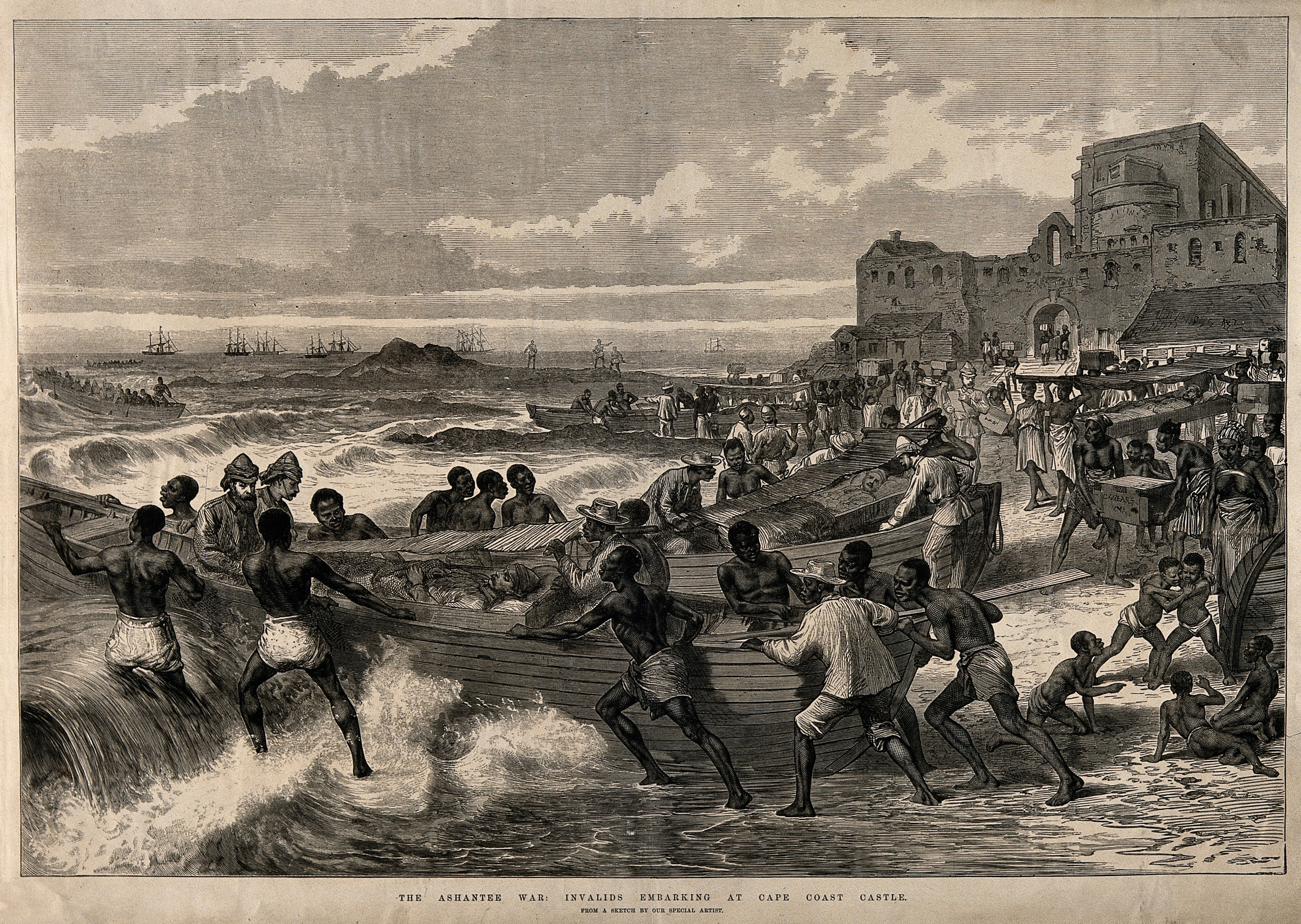
Wounded soldiers being conveyed to hospital ships

Some British accounts pay tribute to the hard fighting of the Ashanti at Amoaful, particularly the tactical insight of their commander, Amankwatia: "The great Chief Amankwatia was among the killed [...] Admirable skill was shown in the position selected by Amankwatia, and the determination and generalship he displayed in the defence fully bore out his great reputation as an able tactician and gallant soldier."

The campaign is also notable for the first recorded instance of a traction engine being employed on active service. Steam sapper number 8 (made by Aveling and Porter) was shipped out and assembled at Cape Coast Castle. As a traction engine it had limited success hauling heavy loads up the beach, but gave good service when employed as a stationary engine driving a large circular saw.

Before the 1873 war, Wolseley had campaigned for a more comfortable clothing for hot climates and in this war had managed to get his troops kitted out in a better uniform.

== Fourth Anglo-Ashanti War (1895–1896) ==
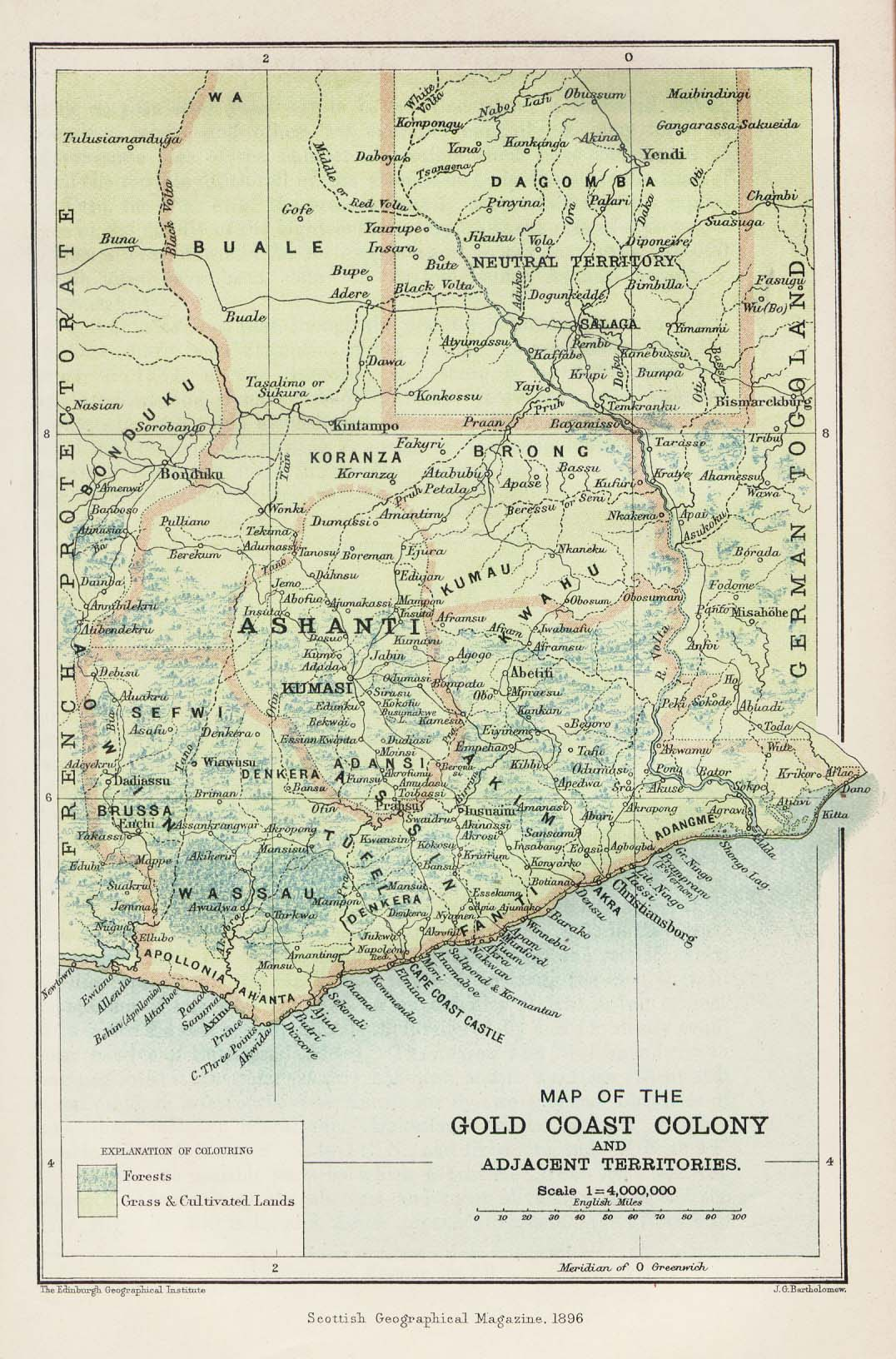
Map from 1896 of the British Gold Coast Colony showing Ashanti

The Fourth Anglo-Ashanti War, also known as the "Second Ashanti Expedition", was brief, lasting only from 26 December 1895 to 4 February 1896. The Ashanti turned down an unofficial offer to become a British protectorate in 1891, extending to 1894. The British also wanted to establish a British resident in Kumasi. The Ashanti King Prempeh I refused to surrender his sovereignty. Wanting to keep French and German forces out of Ashanti territory (and its gold), the British were anxious to conquer the Ashanti once and for all. The Ashanti sent a delegation to London offering concessions on its gold, cocoa and rubber trade as well as submission to the crown. The British however had already made their minds up on a military solution, they were on their way, the delegation only returning to Kumasi a few days before the troops marched in.

Colonel Sir Francis Scott left Cape Coast with the main expeditionary force of British and West Indian troops, Maxim guns and 75mm artillery in December 1895, and travelling along the remnants of the 1874 road arrived in Kumasi in January 1896. Major Robert Baden-Powell led a native levy of several local tribes in the campaign. The Asantehene directed the Ashanti not to resist, but casualties from sickness among the British troops were high. Soon, Governor William Maxwell arrived in Kumasi as well. Asantehene Agyeman Prempeh was unable or unwilling to pay the 50,000 ounces of gold so was arrested and deposed. He was forced to sign a treaty of protection, and with other Ashanti leaders was sent into exile in the Seychelles.

Baden-Powell published a diary called "The downfall of Prempeh", giving the reasons, as he saw them, for the war:

. To put an end to human sacrifice.

. To put a stop to slave-trading and raiding.

. To ensure peace and security for the neighbouring tribes.

. To settle the country and protect the development of trade.

. To get paid up the balance of the war indemnity.

He also believed that if a smaller force had been sent, there would have been bloodshed.

Prempeh I was banished to the Seychelles. Eleven years later, the Boy Scouts were started by Baden-Powell. Later still, after Prempeh was released and returned home, he became Chief Scout of Ashanti.

The British force left Kumasi on 22 January 1896, arriving back at the coast two weeks later. Not a shot had been fired, but 18 Europeans were dead and 50% of the troops were sick. Among the dead was Queen Victoria's son-in-law, Prince Henry of Battenberg, who was taken ill before getting to Kumasi and died on 20 January on board ship, returning to England. In 1897, Ashanti territory became a British protectorate.

== Fifth War, "War of the Golden Stool", 1900 ==
Technology was reaching the Gold Coast, a railway to Kumasi was started in 1898 but had not progressed far when another war broke out. The railway was to be completed in 1903.

In the War of the Golden Stool (1900), also known as the "Third Ashanti Expedition", on 25 March 1900, the British representative, Sir Frederick Mitchell Hodgson committed a political error by insisting he should sit on the Golden Stool, not understanding that it was the Royal throne and very sacred to the Ashanti. He ordered a search be made for it. The Ashanti, enraged by this act, attacked the soldiers engaged in the search.

The British retreated to a small stockade, 50 yards (46 m) square with 12-foot-high (3.7 m) loopholed stone walls and firing turrets at each corner, where eight Europeans, dozens of mixed-race colonial administrators, and 500 Nigerian Hausas with six small field guns and four Maxim guns defended themselves. The British detained several high-ranking leaders in the fort. The stockade was besieged and the telegraph wires cut. A rescue party of 700 arrived in June, but many sick men in the fort could not be evacuated. The healthier men escaped, including Hodgson and his wife and 100 Hausas, and meeting up with the rescue party, managed to avoid the 12,000 Ashanti warriors and make it back to the coast.

On 14 July, a second relief force of 1,000 made it to Kumasi having fought several engagements along the route, relieving the fort on 15 July when they only had a few days of supplies left. The remaining Ashanti court not exiled to the Seychelles had mounted the offensive against the British and Fanti troops resident at the Kumasi Fort, but were defeated.

Yaa Asantewaa, the Queen-Mother of Ejisu, who had led the rebellion, King Prempeh I, and other Ashanti leaders were also sent to the Seychelles. The Ashanti territories became part of the Gold Coast colony on 1 January 1902, on the condition that the Golden Stool would not be violated by British or other non-Akan foreigners. The Ashanti claimed a victory as they had not lost their sacred stool. In September the British sent flying columns out to visit neighbouring peoples who had supported the rebellion, resulting in a number of skirmishes.

The British and their allies suffered 1,070 fatalities in total. The Ashanti casualties are estimated to have been around 2,000. The sacred golden stool, which is depicted on the Ashanti flag, had been well hidden and was only discovered by road workers by accident in 1920. King Prempeh I returned from exile in 1924, travelling to Kumasi by a special train.

== Awards ==
Four awards were made of the Victoria Cross, for Gallantry in the period 1873–74 and two for the 1900 campaign. (See List of Victoria Cross recipients by campaign.)

An Ashanti Medal was created for those involved in the War of the Golden Stool. This expedition lasted from March to September 1900. It was issued as a silver or bronze medal.

== Footnote ==
After the 1896 Expedition, King Prempeh was exiled to the Seychelles. Eleven years later, Baden-Powell created the Boy Scout Movement. King Prempeh was released from exile and restored to Ashanti, and became Patron of Ashanti Scouts.

== See also ==
- List of rulers of Asante
- History of Ghana
- African military systems (1800–1900)
