= Black Watch =

Infantry battalion of the Royal Regiment of Scotland

The Black Watch, 3rd Battalion, Royal Regiment of Scotland
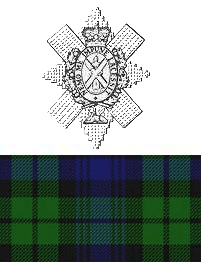
- Cap badge of the Black Watch
- Founded: 1 July 1881 – present
- Country: United Kingdom
- Branch: British Army
- Type: Line infantry
- Role: Recce-strike
- Size: Battalion
- Part of: 11th Brigade
- Garrison/HQ: RHQ – Balhousie Castle; Battalion – Fort George, Inverness
- Motto: Nemo me impune lacessit (Latin) "No One Provokes Me with Impunity"
- March: Quick: "All the Blue Bonnets Are O'er the Border"; Slow: "The Garb of Old Gaul"; Pipes & Drums Quick: "Hielan' Laddie"; Pipes & Drums Slow: "My Home"; Pipes & Drums Slow: "Highland Cradle Song"
- Anniversaries: Red Hackle Day (5 January)
- Battle honours: see below

Commanders
- Current commander: Lt Col Robert Smith
- Royal Colonel: The King

Insignia
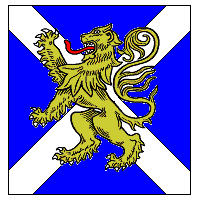
- Tactical Recognition Flash
- Hackle: Red

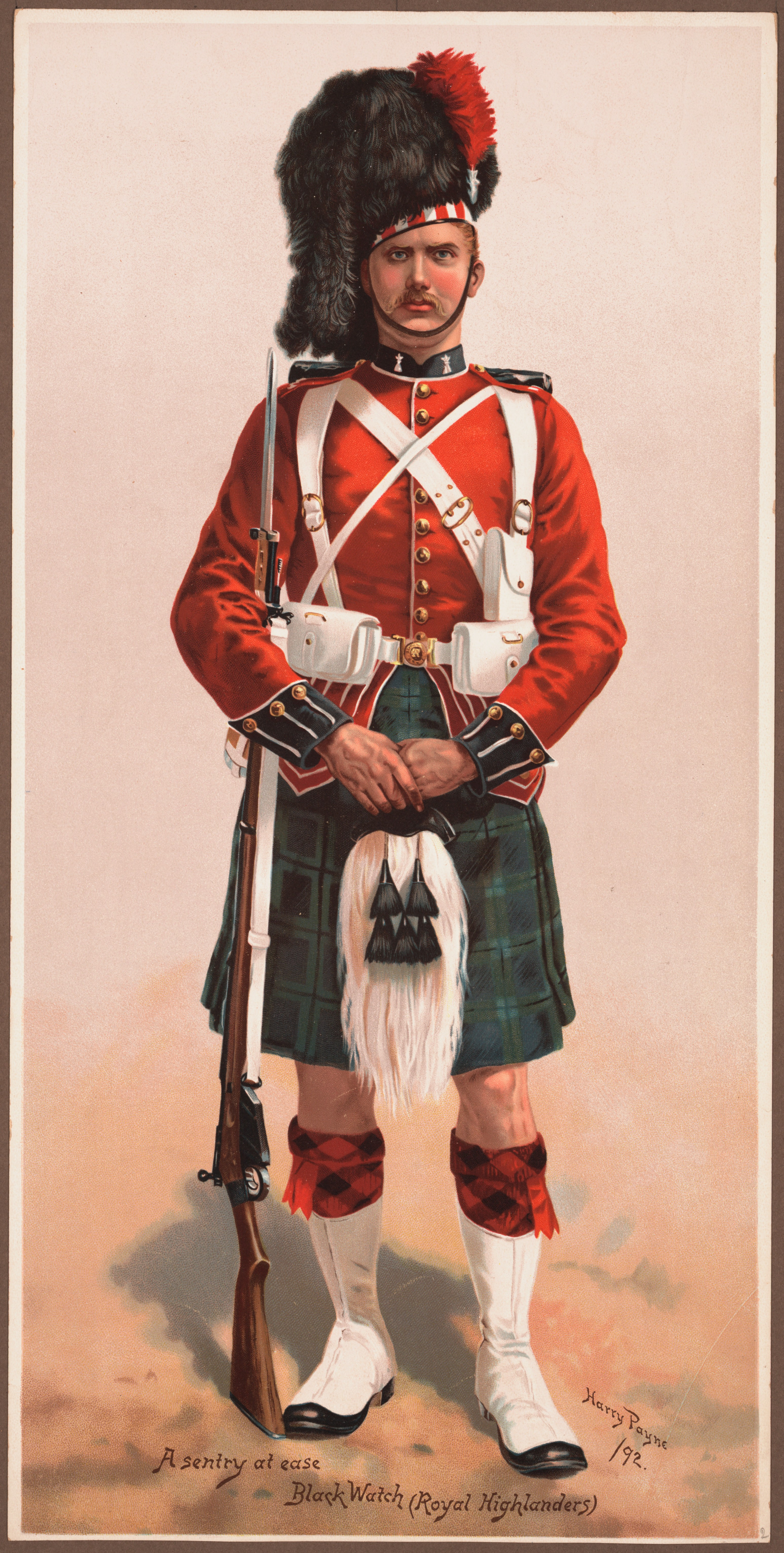
1892 painting of a regimental sentry

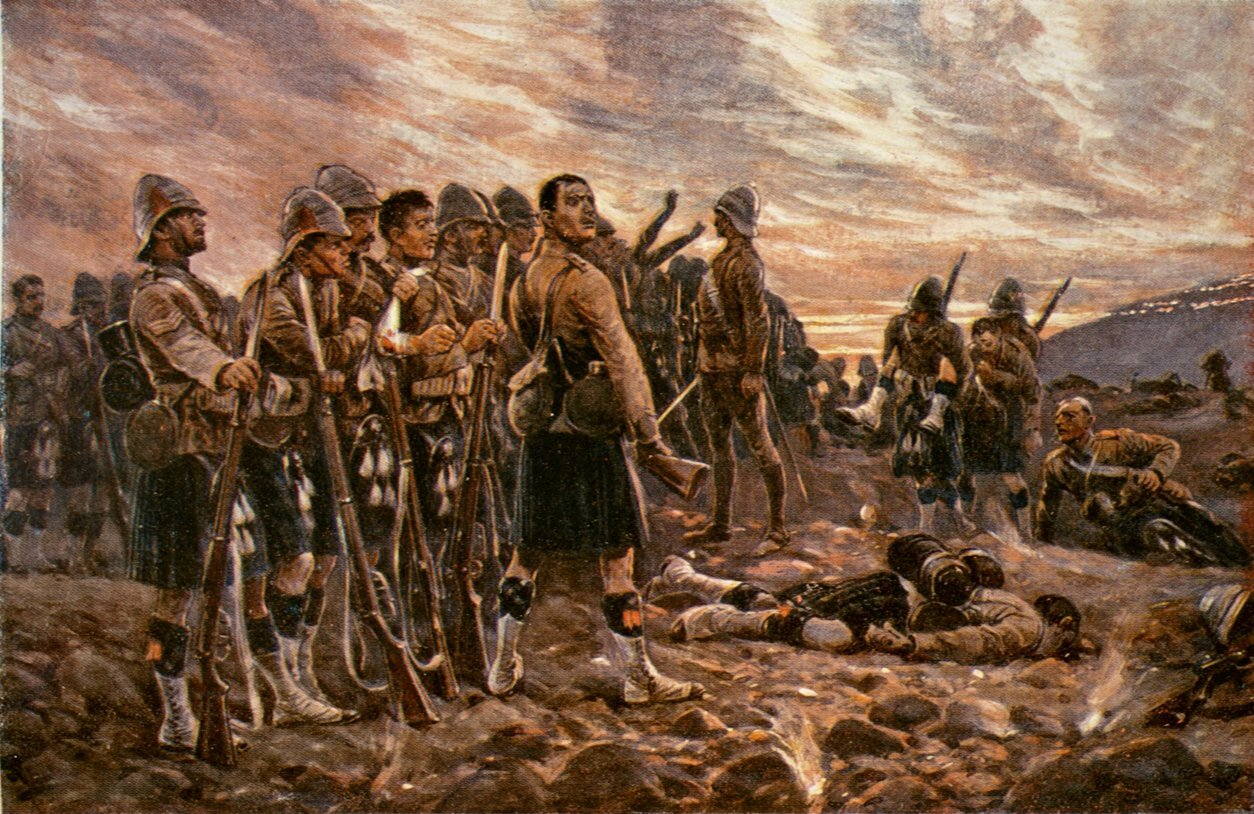
Illustration of the regiment after the Battle of Magersfontein

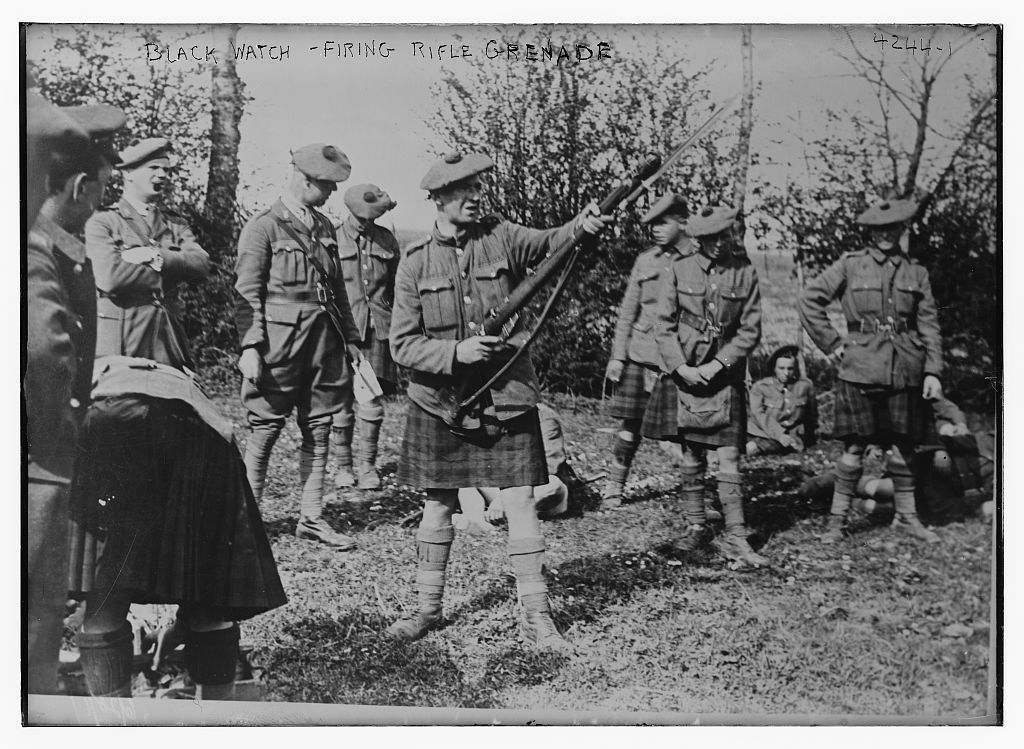
Regimental soldiers firing rifle grenades, 1917

The Black Watch, 3rd Battalion, Royal Regiment of Scotland (3 SCOTS) is an infantry battalion of the Royal Regiment of Scotland. The regiment was created as part of the Childers Reforms in 1881, when the 42nd (Royal Highland) Regiment of Foot (The Black Watch) was amalgamated with the 73rd (Perthshire) Regiment of Foot. It was known as The Black Watch (Royal Highlanders) from 1881 to 1931 and The Black Watch (Royal Highland Regiment) from 1931 to 2006. Part of the Scottish Division for administrative purposes from 1967, it was the senior Highland regiment. It has been part of the Scottish, Welsh and Irish Division for administrative purposes since 2017.

== Origin of the name ==
The source of the regiment's name is uncertain. In 1725, following the Jacobite rebellion of 1715, General George Wade was authorised by George I to form six "watch" companies to patrol the Highlands of Scotland, three from Clan Campbell, one from Clan Fraser of Lovat, one from Clan Munro and one from Clan Grant. These were to be "employed in disarming the Highlanders, preventing depredations, bringing criminals to justice, and hindering rebels and attainted persons from inhabiting that part of the kingdom." Francis Hindes Groome states in his Ordnance Gazetteer of Scotland (1901) that the watch was "embodied in a field [in Aberfeldy] in 1739". The force was known in Gaelic as Am Freiceadan Dubh, "the dark" or "black watch".

This epithet may have come from the uniform plaids of dark tartan with which the companies were provided. Other theories have been put forward; for instance, that the name referred to the "black hearts" of the pro-government militia who had sided with the "enemies of true Highland spirit", or that it came from their original duty in policing the Highlands, namely preventing "blackmail" (Highlanders and reivers demanding extortion payments to spare cattle herds).

== History ==
The regiment was created as part of the Childers Reforms in 1881, when the 42nd (Royal Highland) Regiment of Foot (The Black Watch) was amalgamated with the 73rd (Perthshire) Regiment of Foot to form two battalions of the newly named Black Watch (Royal Highlanders). The 42nd became the 1st Battalion, and the 73rd became the 2nd Battalion.

The 1st Battalion saw action at the Battle of Tel el-Kebir in September 1882 during the Anglo-Egyptian War. It was in combat again during the Mahdist War, at the First and Second Battles of El Teb in February 1884, the Battle of Tamai in March 1884 and at the Battle of Kirbekan in February 1885. They were stationed in India from 1896, but were sent to South Africa for service during the Second Boer War. After the war ended in June 1902 with the Peace of Vereeniging, 630 officers and men left Cape Town on the SS Michigan in late September 1902, arriving at Southampton in late October, when they were posted to Edinburgh.

The 2nd Battalion were posted to South Africa in October 1899, following the outbreak of the Second Boer War. The battalion suffered heavy losses at the Battle of Magersfontein in December 1899. After the end of the war, about 730 officers and men left Point Natal for British India on SS Ionian in October 1902, where, after arrival in Bombay, they were stationed in Sialkot in Umballa in Punjab.

In 1908, the Volunteers and Militia were reorganised nationally, with the former becoming the Territorial Force and the latter the Special Reserve; the regiment now had one Reserve and five Territorial battalions.

=== First World War ===
==== Regular Army ====
The 1st Battalion landed at Le Havre as part of the 1st Brigade in the 1st Division in August 1914 for service on the Western Front. It saw action during the Retreat from Mons in August 1914, the First Battle of the Marne in September 1914 and the First Battle of the Aisne later in September 1914; it also took part in the advance to the Hindenburg Line in September 1918. The 2nd Battalion landed at Marseille as part of the Bareilly Brigade in the 7th (Meerut) Division in October 1914 for service on the Western Front. It took part in the defence of Givenchy in December 1915 and then moved to Mesopotamia later that month and saw action during the siege of Kut in Spring 1916, the fall of Baghdad in March 1917 and the Battle of Istabulat in April 1917. It transferred to Palestine in January 1918 and took part in the Battle of Megiddo in September 1918.

==== Territorial Force ====
The 1/4th (City of Dundee) Battalion landed at Le Havre as part of the Bareilly Brigade in the 7th (Meerut) Division March 1915 for service on the Western Front and, following heavy losses at the Battle of Neuve-Chapelle in March 1915 and the Battle of Festubert in May 1915, amalgamated with the 2nd Battalion in September 1915. The 1/5th (Angus and Dundee) Battalion landed at Le Havre as part of the 24th Brigade in the 8th Division for service on the Western Front. It also saw action at the Battle of Neuve-Chapelle in March 1915 and the Battle of Festubert in May 1915. The 1/6th (Perthshire) Battalion and the 1/7th (Fife) Battalion landed at Boulogne-sur-Mer as part of the 153rd Brigade in the 51st (Highland) Division in May 1915 for service on the Western Front. They saw action at the Battle of the Ancre Heights in October 1916.

==== New Army ====
===== 8th (Service) Battalion =====
The 8th (Service) Battalion was raised in Perth by Lord Sempill of Fintray who had previously served with the Black Watch in the Sudan. Recruiting commenced on 21 August 1914 and the ranks were filled by 3 September 1914. The 8th was the senior battalion in the 26th Infantry Brigade, which in turn was the leading brigade of the 9th (Scottish) Division, the first division of Lord Kitchener's New Army. As such, the 8th (Service) Battalion can claim to be the vanguard of the "First Hundred Thousand" men in Kitchener's K1 Army. The battalion officially formed at Albuera Barracks in August 1914 before moving to Maida Barracks in September 1914. A core cadre of experienced regular and ex-regular officers, warrant officers and non-commissioned officers formed the backbone of the new unit. The enlisted men came mainly from the cities, farms and collieries of Fife and Forfarshire. 16 January 1915 saw the 26th Infantry Brigade move from Aldershot to Hampshire with the 8th Battalion billeted at Alton. On 22 January 1915 Lord Kitchener inspected the battalion, along with the rest of the 9th (Scottish) Division during downpour of rain on Laffan's Plain (now Farnborough Airport). The battalion marched to Oxney Farm Camp near Bordon on 21 March 1915 to undertake a final musketry course where the 8th Battalion Machine Gun Section obtained the highest score in the brigade. In early May 1915, the battalion received the long-awaited orders to proceed overseas to France.

The machine-gun section and battalion transport led the way, sailing to Le Havre via Southampton on 9 May with the bulk of the battalion following on 10 May sailing to Boulogne via Folkestone. The whole battalion then travelled on by train to Arques near Saint-Omer arriving in the early hours of 11 May, from here they heard the distant rumble of the guns at Ypres for the first time. The battalion entered the trenches for the first time on 4 July 1915, relieving the 5th (Service) Battalion of the Queen's Own Cameron Highlanders in the front line East of Festubert, they were relieved in turn on 7 July 1915 by 10th (Service) Battalion of the Highland Light Infantry. In this short four day introduction to trench warfare, the battalion lost three men killed and seven wounded.

On 25 September 1915, the battalion took a leading role in the opening actions of the Battle of Loos. During three hard days of fighting at Loos, the battalion lost 19 officers and 492 other ranks either killed or wounded. This included the commanding officer Lt Col Lord Sempill, the Second in Command Major John Gerrard Collins, three of the four Company Commanders and the Regimental Sergeant Major William Henry Black. Another notable casualty at Loos was Captain The Hon. Fergus Bowes-Lyon, the elder brother of Elizabeth Bowes-Lyon who would later marry the future king George VI.

The 8th (Service) Battalion spent the rest of the war in the trenches of the Western Front and took part in a number of key battles.

- 1916 – Battle of Bazentin Ridge.
- 1917 – First battle of the Scarpe, Third Battle of the Scarpe, First Battle of Passchendale.
- 1918 – First Battle of Bapaume, Battle of Messines, First Battle of Kemmel Ridge, Second Battle of Kemmel Ridge, Fifth Battle of Ypres, Battle of Courtrai.

Following the armistice, demobilization began on 27 December 1918 and men were released in batches during the following months. In mid-August 1919 the remnants of the battalion returned to England, sailing from Calais to Folkestone before marching to Shorncliffe where trains were boarded to Brocton Camp. Demobilization continued and on 15 November 1919, the battalion was reduced to cadre strength. Following the dispersal of the remaining officers and other ranks, the commanding officer, adjutant and quartermaster returned to the Black Watch Depot in Perth where the battalion was officially disbanded in mid-December 1919. During active service between 1915 and 1918 the 8th (Service) Battalion lost a total of 169 officers (69 killed/93 wounded/8 missing) and 3,597 other ranks (1,123 killed/1,673 wounded/510 missing). The bravery of the 8th is reflected in the number of gallantry decorations awarded, this includes 7 Distinguished Service Orders, 32 Military Crosses, 38 Distinguished Conduct Medals, 6 Meritorious Service Medals and 137 Military Medals.

===== 9th (Service) Battalion =====
The 9th (Service) Battalion was raised from an initial draft of 200 men sent from Perth to join the 8th (Service) Battalion at Aldershot on 6 September 1914. As the 8th Battalion was already fully manned, permission was granted to form a second unit from the drafts reaching the 8th Battalion between 6 September and 9 September, forming part of Kitchener's K2 Army. This became the 9th (Service) Battalion under the command of Major Thomas Owen Lloyd, an ex-regular Black Watch officer who had retired from 1st Battalion in 1909.

The new battalion lacked experienced officers and Lord Sempill, the commanding officer of 8th Battalion, consented to transfer one of his three regular officers to 9th Battalion to act as adjutant. At company level, almost all of the officers were newly commissioned second lieutenants with no prior military experience. The same was true of the non-commissioned officers, with the exception of the RSM, two former colour sergeants and a few old and bold ex soldiers, all NCO's were new to the army and promoted to acting rank on the recommendation of their company commander.

September to November was spent training at Albuhera Barracks in Aldershot, where on 26 September the battalion paraded for the first time as a complete unit in front of the king, queen and Lord Kitchener as part of the 44th Brigade in the 15th (Scottish) Division. On this first formal parade, all of the division wore civilian clothes as uniforms had yet to be issued; it was not until the middle of October that the men were all dressed alike. and kilts did not arrive until 20 January 1915. by which time the battalion had taken up billets in the village of Liss in Hampshire. On 23 February 1915, the battalion moved to Chiseldon Camp in Wiltshire and commenced musketry training on 1 March; at this point only 25 service rifles were available. 12 May 1915 saw the battalion move with the rest of the 44th Brigade to Parkhouse Camp in the Salisbury Plain Training Area to conduct brigade manoeuvres. The king inspected the 15th Division a second time on 21 June 1915 and was greatly impressed at the progress made in such a short space of time.

On 4 July 1915, the battalion received embarkation orders for France. The machine gun and transport sections led the way and departed Parkhouse Camp on 7 July sailing on the SS Mount Temple that night from Southampton to Le Havre. The bulk of the battalion left Parkhouse early on 8 July, sailing on the SS Invicta from Folkestone and arriving in Boulogne that same evening. The 9th (Service) Battalion first entered the trenches on 2 August 1915 when it relieved 23rd/24th Battalions of the London Regiment in a section of the line East of Maroc and opposite the famous 'Double Crassier'. The battalion was in turn relieved on 9 August 1915 by 10th Battalion Scottish Rifles. To their credit, the battalion suffered no casualties during this first introduction to trench warfare. On 25 September 1915. the battalion went in to action at the Battle of Loos where it suffered severe losses in two days of hard fighting. Of the 940 officers and men who went into action on 25 September, only 98 returned to their billets when the battalion was relieved by 21st Division on 26 September. The battalion lost a total of 701 men at Loos: 11 officers killed and 10 wounded with 360 other ranks killed or missing and 320 wounded.

The 9th (Service) Battalion spent the rest of the war in the trenches of the Western Front and took part in a number of key battles.

- 1916 – Battle of Delville Wood, Battle of Flers-Courcelette.
- 1917 – First battle of the Scarpe, Second Battle of the Scarpe, Battle of Pilckem Ridge, Battle of the Menin Road Ridge.
- 1918 – First Battle of Bapaume, First Battle of Arras.

On 11 May 1918, the original 9th (Service) Battalion left the line for the final time and was merged with the 4/5th Territorial Battalion. This amalgamation was part of measures taken to address the drain on manpower across the British Army. Whilst the bulk of the 9th went to the 4/5th a small training cadre of 10 officers and 51 other ranks remained and were initially employed training newly arrived American troops. Later that month the cadre returned to Aldershot where they spent two months raising and training a new unit which became 2/9th (Service) Battalion assigned to the 47th Brigade, 16th (Irish) Division. The 2/9th left Aldershot on 30 July 1918 sailing from Folkestone to Boulogne and reaching billets at Hodecq the following day. The next eighteen days were spent training before 2/9th entered the battle area at Nœux-les-Mines on 19 August 1918 where it relieved the 1st Battalion. On 21 August the battalion proceeded by rail to Sailly-Labourse where it supported the 14th Leicesters and 18th Welch holding the line in the Hohenzollern Sector. On 2 September 1918, the battalion was involved in a costly trench raid losing 31 men. The battalion advanced with the 16th Division until 20 October 1918 when it was assigned the task of repairing roads around Escœuilles where it was when the armistice was declared on 11 November 1918. Following the armistice, the battalion started the process of demobilization and found itself at Fretin by 27 November 1918 where it remained until Spring 1919 when it was reduced to cadre strength and moved to Pont-à-Marcq. The cadre returned to Scotland in July 1919 where the 2/9th was finally disbanded. During active service between 1915 and 1918 the battalion lost 140 officers (46 killed/88 wounded/6 missing) and 2,899 other ranks (645 killed/2,029 wounded/225 missing). The bravery of the 9th is reflected in the number of gallantry decorations awarded, including 3 Distinguished Service Orders, 28 Military Crosses, 7 Distinguished Conduct Medals, 2 Meritorious Service Medals and 65 Military Medals.

===== 10th (Service) Battalion =====
The 10th (Service) Battalion was raised in Perth at the beginning of September 1914 under Lt Col Sir William Stewart Dick-Cunyngham, 8th Baronet of Lambrughton. By 20 September 1914, a core body of 400 men had volunteered and were sent south to train at Shrewton in the Salisbury Plain Training Area, where the 10th was to form part of the 77th Infantry Brigade alongside the 10th Battalion Argyll and Sutherland Highlanders, 11th Battalion Scottish Rifles and 8th Battalion Royal Scots Fusiliers as part of Kitchener's K3 Army. Officers were gradually appointed to the battalion; some had previous Regular or Territorial military experience but the majority had none. November saw the battalion move to Bristol where the men practised trench digging in Ashton Park. The men were comfortably quartered in several public buildings: A and C companies occupied Colston Hall, B the Victoria Gallery and D the Coliseum (a large ice skating rink); the officers were billeted at the Colston Hotel. In the New Year, makeshift uniforms were finally replaced by the coveted kilt and sporran. March 1915 saw the 77th Infantry Brigade move to Sutton Veny to engage in brigade and divisional manoeuvres with the 26th Division. Training was completed by the end of July 1915 and during August three days 'farewell' leave was granted to officers and men. On 10 September 1915 embarkation orders were received and on 17 September an advance party of 5 officers and 109 other ranks left for France, arriving at Longueau on 20 September before marching 20 miles to Bougainville to arrange billets for the battalion. The bulk of the battalion soon followed, leaving Folkestone at 6pm on 20 September aboard the SS La Marguerite and arriving at Boulogne around midnight. The rest of the night was spent under canvas at Ostrahove Camp, and next morning the battalion boarded trains to Sallux before marching the final fifteen miles to rendezvous with the advance party at Bougainville.

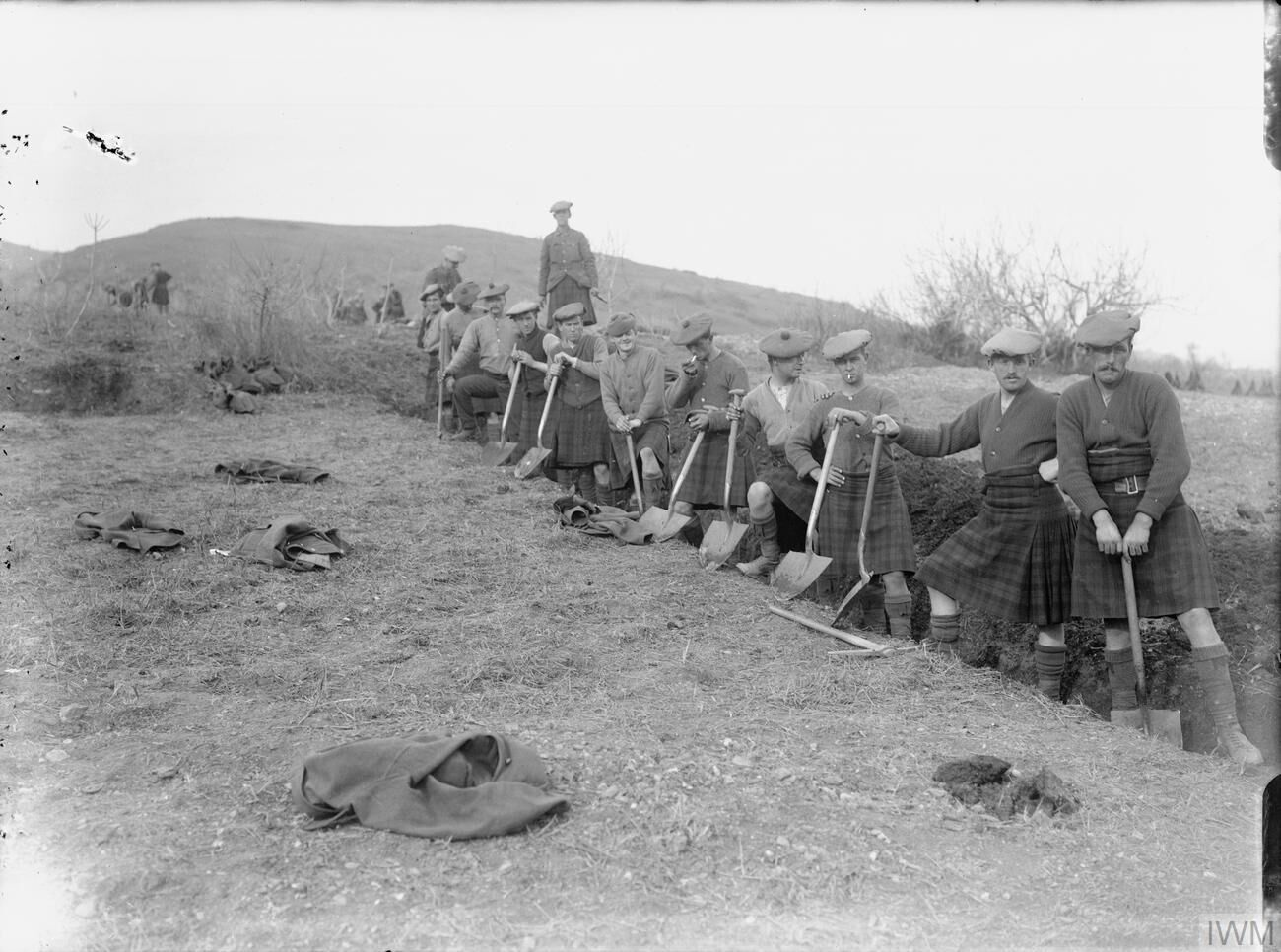
10th (Service) Battalion, Black Watch entrenching in the hills between the villages of Aivatli and Laina above the port of Salonika, Greece, December 1915.

On 23 September 1915, the battalion received orders to march to Salouël which was reached at midnight after seven hour's march in torrential rain. The following morning the 77th Infantry Brigade marched on to Villers-Bretonneux and were inspected on the road by the XII Corps Commander Lt-Gen Sir Henry Fuller Maitland Wilson who congratulated the 10th battalion on its march discipline and fine appearance. The battalion spent five days training at Villers-Bretonneux where the men could hear the distant rumbling of the artillery supporting the Battle of Loos, for which 10th Battalion was held in reserve. On 29 September 1915, the battalion left for Proyart and the companies entered the front line trenches for the first time for forty-eight hours of instruction with the resident units. A and D companies joined 2nd Battalion Duke of Cornwall's Light Infantry in the line at Fontaine-lès-Cappy, with B and C companies rotating in on 2 October with the Royal Irish Fusiliers.

The battalion took responsibility for its first stretch of the line on 14 October when it relieved the King's Own Yorkshire Light Infantry around Bray, with battalion HQ located in the town of Carnoy. On 5 November the battalion received orders to prepare for immediate deployment to Salonika to participate in operations on the Macedonian front. On 10 November the battalion marched to Longueau from where they boarded trains to Marseille which they reached soon after midday on 12 November. The battalion marched straight to the quay to begin boarding HMS Magnificent alongside two companies from the 11th Battalion Worcestershire Regiment and two companies from the 12th Battalion Argyll and Sutherland Highlanders. The course followed was north of Corsica, passing Elba, south through the Straits of Messina, along the coast of Sicily and on to Alexandria, which was reached on 18 November 1915. At Alexandria, the men disembarked and spent the night at Maritza Camp before re-embarking on HMS Magnificent and sailing for Salonika, which was reached on 24 November.

The 10th Battalion spent the rest of 1915 and early 1916 constructing and manning part of the 'Birdcage Defensive Line' in the hills surrounding Salonika; the stretch of line allocated to the 10th ran between the villages of Aivatli and Laina. June 1916 saw the battalion move 'up country', spending time in division reserve and manning trenches in the Vladaja Line. On 8 May 1917, the 10th Battalion took part in the Battle of Doiran. Out of 600 men engaged in this action, the 10th lost 5 officers killed and 6 wounded, with 63 other ranks killed and 309 wounded. Due to losses incurred as a result of the German spring offensive it was decided that one battalion in each brigade would be withdrawn from Greece and transferred to the Western Front. On 14 June 1918, the 10th Battalion received orders to move to France, with the men embarking on the French transport Odessa at Itea on 6 July, bound for Taranto. From Italy, the battalion travelled by train to Abancourt, finally reaching the rest camp on 14 July, and were attached to 197th Infantry Brigade in the 66th Division. On 20 September, the battalion was informed that they were to be disbanded, with orders received on 29 September to send one complete company to each of the 1st, 6th and 14th Black Watch Battalions to replace losses. On 15 October, the disbandment of the 10th (Service) Battalion was reported as complete to 197th Infantry Brigade. During active service between 1915 and 1918 the 10th (Service) Battalion lost a total of 18 officers (8 killed/10 wounded) and 435 other ranks (122 killed/311 wounded/2 missing). The bravery of the 10th is reflected in the number of gallantry decorations awarded, including 2 Distinguished Service Orders, 6 Military Crosses, 3 Distinguished Conduct Medals, 3 Meritorious Service Medals and 10 Military Medals.

=== Second World War ===
==== Regular Army ====
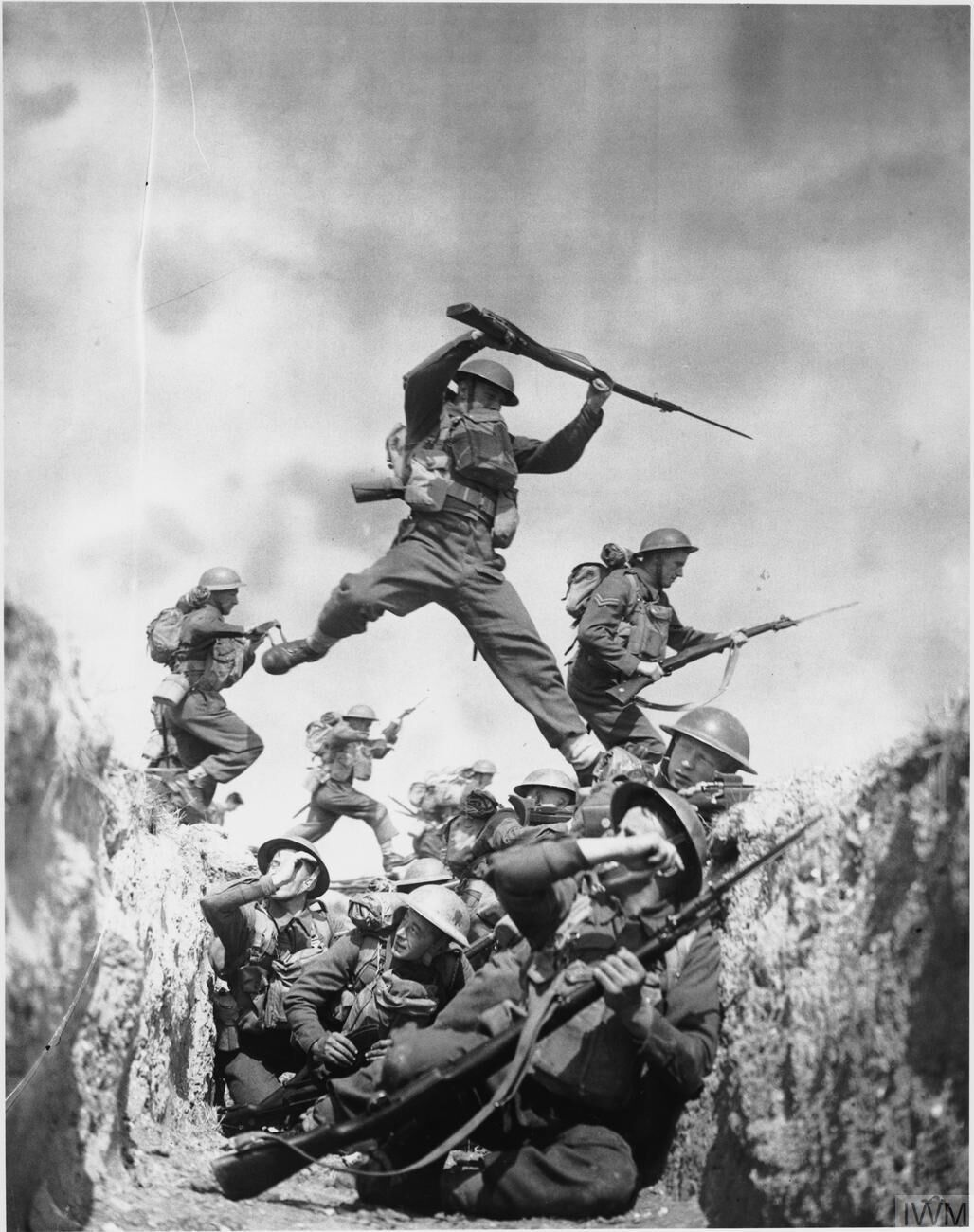
Men of the 6th Battalion, Black Watch, stage a bayonet charge over trenches during a training exercise on the Isle of Wight, 10 August 1940

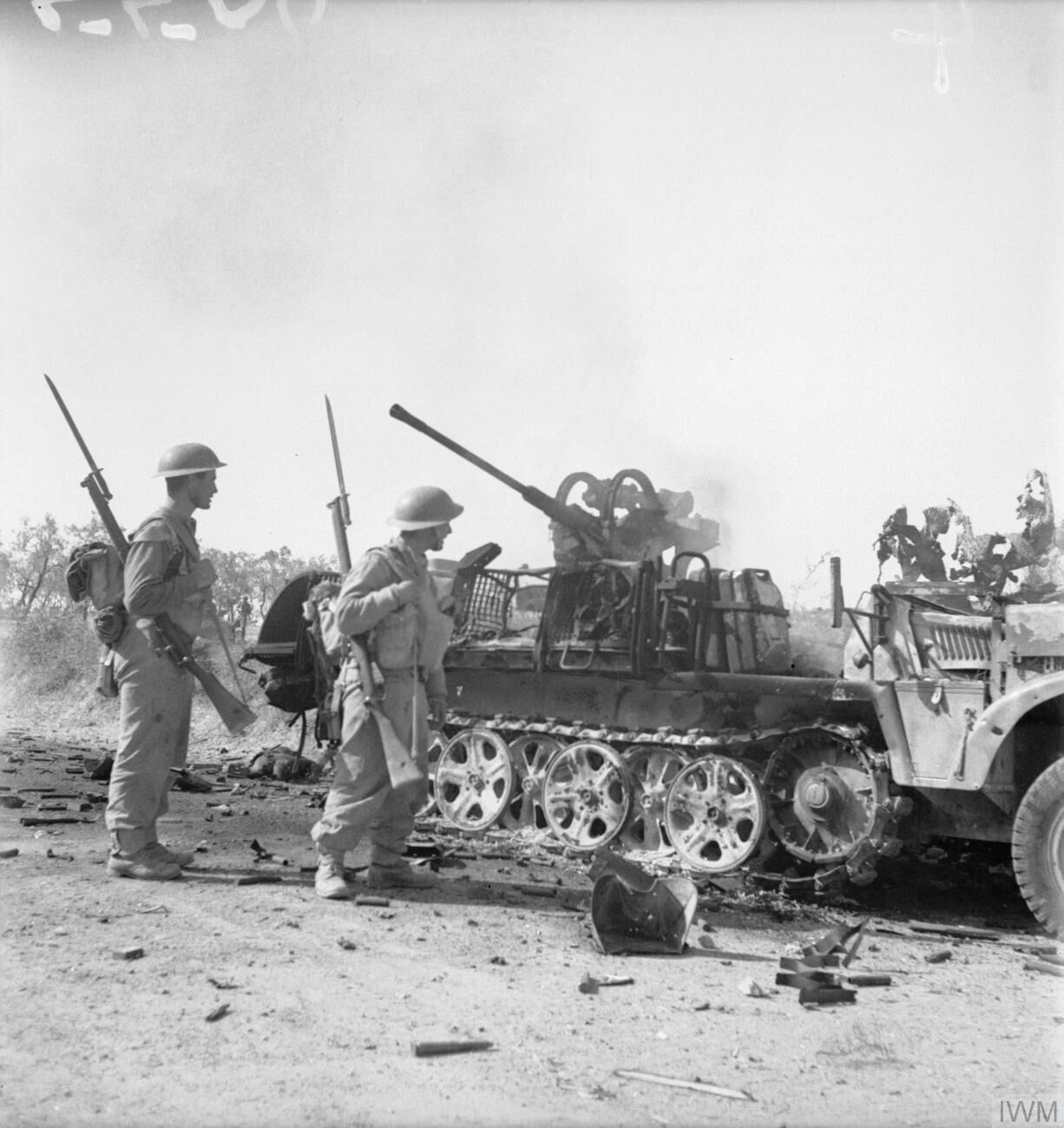
Two soldiers from the Black Watch pass by a burning German anti-aircraft half-track, Sicily, 5 August 1943

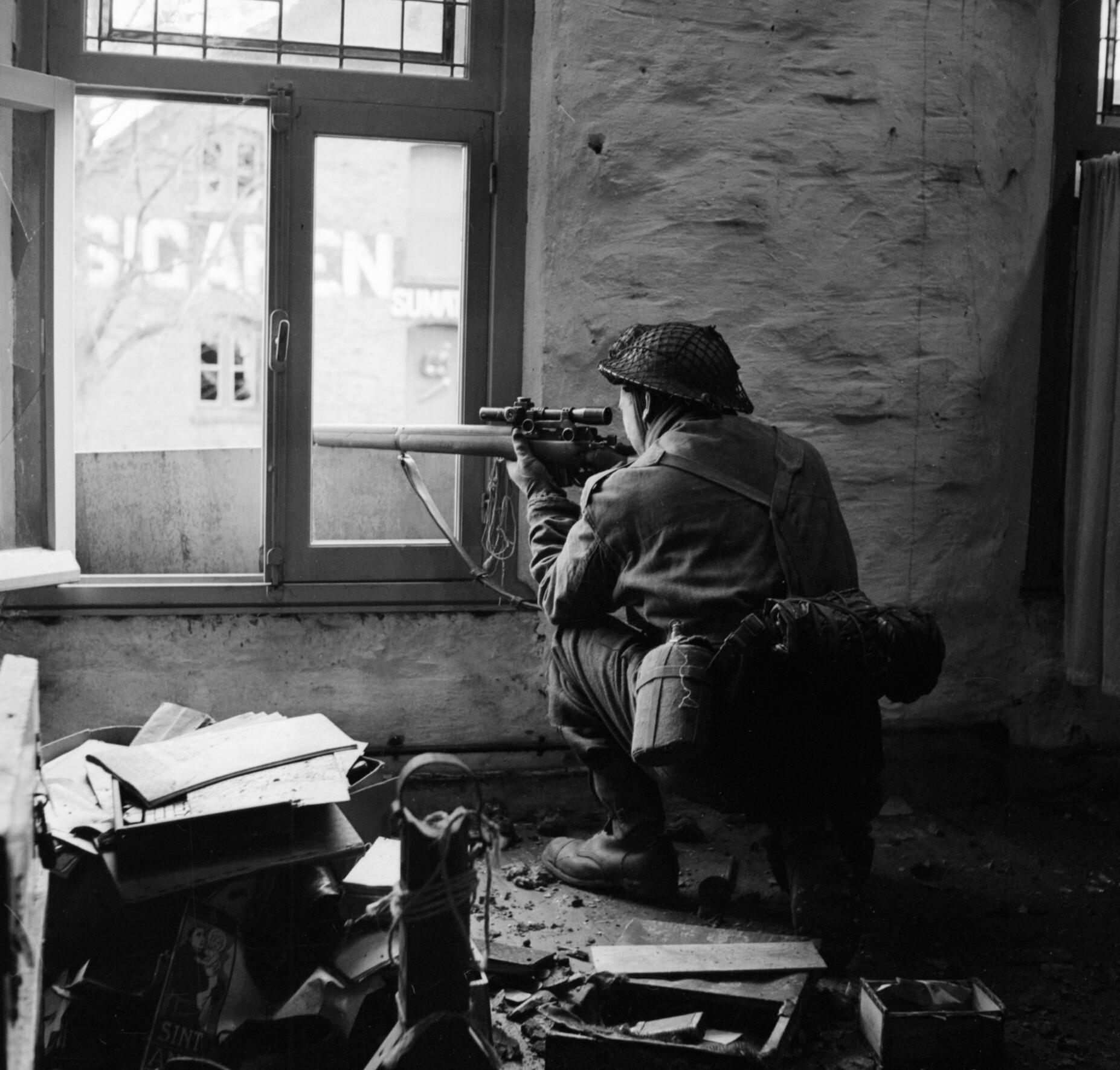
A sniper from "C" Company, 5th Battalion, The Black Watch in position in a ruined building in Gennep, the Netherlands, 14 February 1945

The 1st Battalion landed in France in September 1939 as part of the 12th Brigade in the 4th Infantry Division for service with the British Expeditionary Force (BEF). The battalion later transferred to the 153rd Brigade of the 51st (Highland) Division and was captured at Saint-Valery-en-Caux during the Battle of France. It was reformed from reserve units of the 9th (Highland) Infantry Division in August 1940 and moved to North Africa in August 1942 where it fought at the Second Battle of El Alamein in October 1942 and then continued to fight in the Tunisian Campaign before it took part in the Allied invasion of Sicily in July 1943. It also took part in the Normandy landings in June 1944, the Battle for Caen later that month and the Battle of the Falaise Pocket in August 1944. It later saw action at the Battle of the Bulge in January 1945, Battle of the Reichswald in February 1945 and the crossing of the Rhine in March 1945.

The 2nd Battalion was serving in Palestine from where it was sent to East Africa in August 1940 and saw action during the Italian conquest of British Somaliland. It was sent to Crete, as part of the 14th Brigade in the 8th Division, and took part in the Battle of Heraklion in May 1941. It moved to North Africa in October 1941 and took part in the break out from Tobruk in November 1941.

==== Territorial Army ====
The 4th Battalion landed in France in January 1940 as part of the 153rd Brigade in the 51st (Highland) Division for service with the BEF and then took part in the Dunkirk evacuation in June 1940. From July 1940 to April 1943 the battalion was stationed in Gibraltar. The battalion remained in the United Kingdom for the rest of the war.

The 5th Battalion landed in North Africa as part of the 153rd Brigade in the 51st (Highland) Division and fought at the Second Battle of El Alamein in October 1942. It also took part in the Normandy landings, while attached to the 3rd Parachute Brigade, in June 1944 and saw action at the Battle for Caen followed by the Battle of Bréville later that month. It saw combat again at the Battle of the Falaise Pocket in August 1944 and the Battle of the Bulge in January 1945.

The 6th Battalion landed in France in January 1940 as part of the 154th Brigade in the 51st (Highland) Division for service with the BEF. The battalion exchanged places with the 1st Battalion and became part of the 12th Brigade of the 4th Division and then took part in the Dunkirk evacuation in June 1940. It moved to North Africa in the spring of 1943 for service in the final stages of the Tunisian Campaign and then on to the Italian Front in February 1944 where it took part in the Battle of Monte Cassino in the spring of 1944. The battalion later fought on the Gothic Line before being sent to Greece in late 1944, where it remained for the rest of the war.

The 7th Battalion landed in North Africa as part of the 154th Brigade in the 51st (Highland) Division and fought at the Second Battle of El Alamein in October 1942. It also took part in the Normandy landings in June 1944, the Battle for Caen later that month and the Battle of the Falaise Pocket in August 1944. It later saw action at the Battle of the Bulge in January 1945. The 7th Battalion was also one of the first battalions to cross the river Rhine during Operation Plunder on 23 March 1945.

=== Postwar ===
The 2nd Battalion was deployed to India in 1945 and arrived at Cherat Cantonment, thirty-four miles from Peshawar, on 15 August 1947, when India and Pakistan became independent. In February 1946, the Black Watch was deployed to suppress the Royal Indian Navy mutiny at Karachi. On 26 February 1948 the battalion became the last British Army unit to leave Pakistan, boarding a transport ship at Karachi, after a formal parade through the streets with the salute taken by the prime minister Jinnah.

The regiment won honours after the Second Battle of the Hook in November 1952 during the Korean War. The regiment helped to suppress the Mau Mau Uprising in Kenya in 1953 and to suppress the actions of EOKA during intercommunal violence in Cyprus in the late 1950s.

During the state funeral of John F. Kennedy in November 1963, nine bagpipers from the regimental band which had been on tour in the USA were invited to participate in the funeral procession. Between the White House and the Cathedral of St. Matthew the Apostle they performed The Brown Haired Maiden, The Badge of Scotland, The 51st Highland Division, and The Barren Rocks of Aden. The Black Watch had won such renown that in December 1964 during an Anglo-American summit, President Lyndon Johnson asked the British prime minister Harold Wilson to send the Black Watch to Vietnam, a request that was refused.

The Black Watch served in Northern Ireland during the Troubles as part of Operation Banner. The regiment was frequently a major target of the Provisional Irish Republican Army and the Irish National Liberation Army. A lance corporal serving with the regiment was shot by a sniper in East Belfast in November 1971 and a young private serving with the regiment was killed while on foot patrol in Dungannon, County Tyrone, by a remote control device in July 1978.

==== Hong Kong handover ceremony ====
The Black Watch was the last British military unit to leave Hong Kong in 1997, and it played a prominent role in the handover ceremony.

== Modern day ==
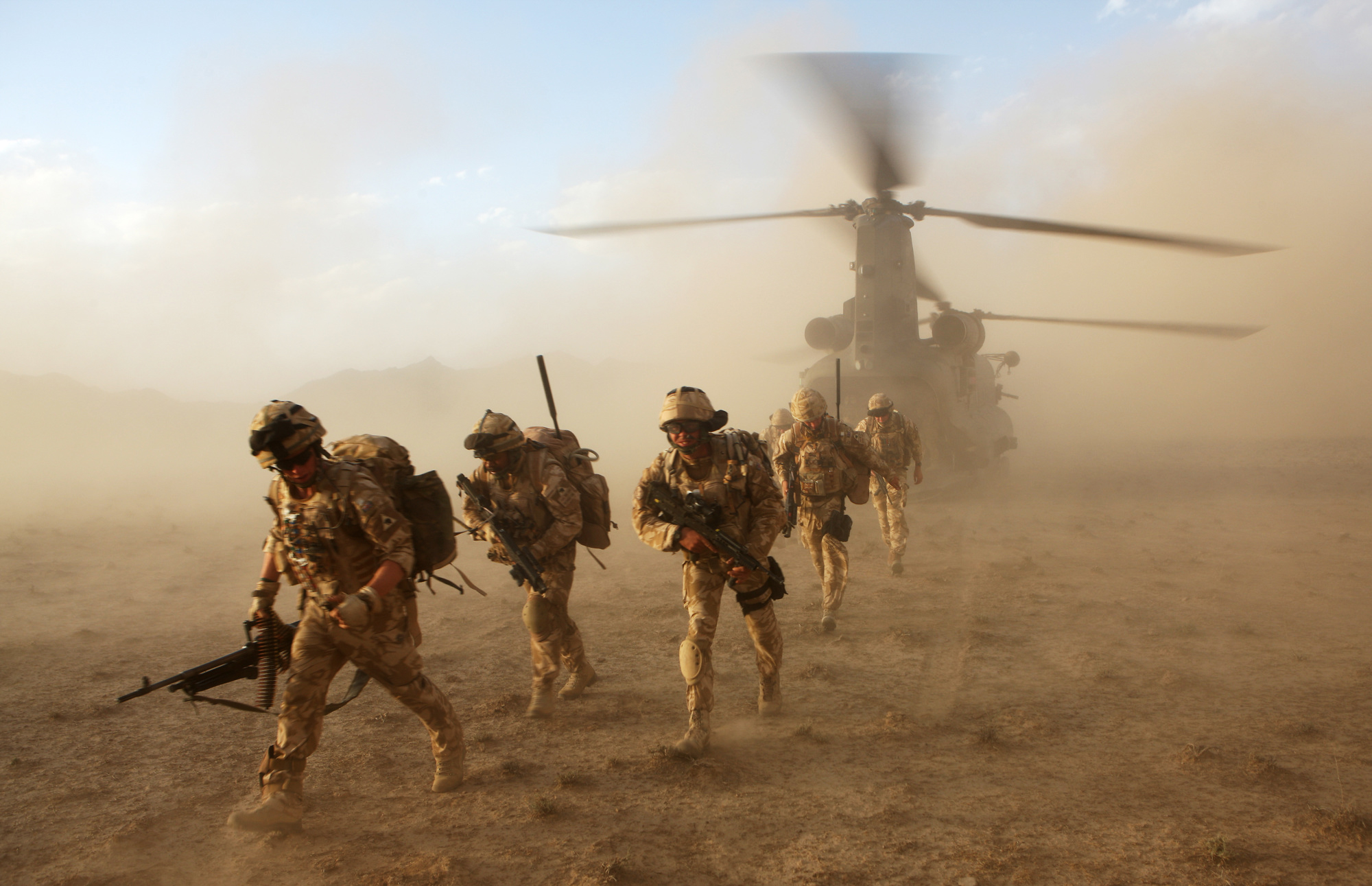
Soldiers from 3 Scots (The Black Watch) deploy from a Chinook helicopter at the start of an anti-narcotics operation in Sangin, Afghanistan, in 2009.

During the 2003 Iraq War, the Black Watch fought during Operation Telic in the initial attack on Basra, and during its deployment, the unit suffered a single fatality. The following year, the Black Watch was dispatched to Iraq again, as part of 4 (Armoured) Brigade. On 12 August, a soldier from the regiment was killed as a result of an improvised explosive device (IED). In October, the Black Watch was at the centre of political controversy after the United States Army requested British forces to be moved further north, outside of the British-controlled Multi-National Division (South East), to replace forces temporarily redeployed for the Second Battle of Fallujah. Despite objections in Parliament, the deployment went ahead. Based at Camp Dogwood, located between Fallujah and Karbala, in an area later dubbed the "Triangle of Death", the Black Watch came under sustained insurgent attack from mortars and rockets. On 29 October, during the journey to their new base, a Black Watch soldier was killed in a road accident. On 4 November, three soldiers and an interpreter were killed by a car bomb at a check point, and on 8 November, another soldier was killed.

Under a plan devised by Lieutenant General Alistair Irwin and approved by General Sir Mike Jackson, on 16 December 2004, it was announced that the Black Watch was to join with five other Scottish regiments – the Royal Scots, the King's Own Scottish Borderers, the Royal Highland Fusiliers, The Highlanders and the Argyll and Sutherland Highlanders – to form the Royal Regiment of Scotland, a single regiment consisting of five regular and two territorial battalions. The measure, which reflected recruiting difficulties and the inefficiencies inherent in maintaining a number of relatively small separate units, took place on 28 March 2006. The Black Watch were retained following intervention from Queen Elizabeth II.

In July 2007 the battalion moved from Palace Barracks in Belfast to Fort George.

On 24 June 2009, it was reported that elements of the battalion numbering about 350 troops carried out one of the largest air assault operations of the NATO troops in Afghanistan, named Operation Panther's Claw, by deploying into and attacking a Taliban stronghold located near Bābājī (باباجی ), north of Lashkar Gah. The operation commenced on 19 June just before midnight. After a number of combat engagements with the insurgents, the soldiers of the battalion secured three main crossing points: the Lui Mandey Wadi crossing, the Nahr-e-Burgha canal and the Shamalan canal. Lieutenant Colonel Stephen Cartwright, Commanding Officer of The Black Watch battalion, was reported saying that this operation established a firm foothold in what was the last remaining Taliban area controlled in the southern Helmand Province. The location of the Taliban force in the area had allowed it to conduct attacks on the A01 highway, a major national route connecting Kandahar and Herat. During 22 June, troops of the battalion also "found 1.3 tonnes of poppy seed and a number of improvised explosive devices and anti-personnel mines before they could be laid." Analysis by the United Nations Food and Agriculture Organisation revealed the haul to be of mung beans, not poppy seed.

Following the Army 2020 Refine reorganisation, the battalion was to remain at Fort George until 2023 where it was to move to another barracks in Scotland. This would later be changed in 2021 with the battalion to relocate to Leuchars in 2029 instead. Following the reorganisation, the battalion was equipped with the Foxhound light mechanised vehicle. The battalion was also moved under the command of the 51st Infantry Brigade and Headquarters Scotland.

In the later part of 2023 the battalion was subordinated to 11th Security Forces Assistance Brigade in Aldershot. The battalion was reduced to 301 personnel, in line with a Security Forces Assistance Battalion order of battle.

11th SFA Brigade was redesignated 11th Brigade in 2024, transitioning back to Field Army Troops, with the combat role of tactical recce-strike.

== Structure ==
The regiment is currently organised into a standard light infantry organisation (included are affiliated units):

- Home Headquarters, at Fort George, Inverness – subordinate to RHQ, Royal Regiment of Scotland based at Edinburgh Castle
- Active Battalion, at Fort George, Inverness – organised as a Security Force Assistance Battalion
  - Battalion Headquarters
  - Headquarters Company
  - A (Grenadier) Company, with ANPR (Pipes and Drums) B, and D (Light) Companies (Light Infantry)
  - C (Fire Support) Company
- 51st Highland Volunteers, 7th Battalion Royal Regiment of Scotland (Army Reserve)
  - A (Black Watch) Company, in Dundee
    - Platoon, at Gordon Barracks, Aberdeen
    - Lovat Scouts Platoon, in Kirkcaldy
- The Black Watch Regimental Museum, at Balhousie Castle, Perth

== Regimental museum ==
The battalion headquarters and regimental museum are at Balhousie Castle in Perth.

== Uniform and traditions ==
The Black Watch's primary recruiting areas are in Fife, Dundee, Angus and Perth and Kinross. The battalion is permitted to retain its most famous distinction, the red hackle on the Tam o'Shanter.

== Notable members ==
The following are notable individuals who served with the regiment:

- Alfred Anderson, Scotland's last surviving World War I veteran (d. 2005)
- Bernard Fergusson, Baron Ballantrae, the last British-born Governor-General of New Zealand
- Hugh Rose, 24th of Kilravock, Commander of the 1st Battalion.
- James C. Gibson, Scottish-born plantation manager and community leader in British Guiana. Acting Staff Corporal during World War I.
- Jim Baxter, Scottish footballer
- Fergus Bowes-Lyon, older brother of Queen Elizabeth The Queen Mother
- Duncan Campbell, Scots nobleman and British army officer
- Iain Cuthbertson, actor
- Harold Davis, Scottish former professional football player
- Henry Davie, Liberal Member of Parliament for Haddington
- Adam Ferguson, Scottish philosopher, social scientist and historian
- Al Foreman, British lightweight boxing champion, assigned as a non-combat drummer boy at the end of WWI at age 14, very brief service. Later received Distinguished Flying Cross with Royal Air Force in WWII.
- Stewart Granger, actor
- J. B. S. Haldane, British-born geneticist and evolutionary biologist
- Karl Leyser, German-born medieval historian and Oxford professor
- Christopher Logue, English poet
- Fulton Mackay, Scottish actor
- Gillean Maclaine, the 25th hereditary Chief of Clan Maclaine of Lochbuie
- Lachlan Macquarie, Governor of New South Wales, Australia from 1810 to 1821
- Robert Munro, the original Black Watch commander, Colonel Sir Robert Munro
- John Murray, theologian
- Brian Nelson, Northern Irish loyalist
- Eric Newby, English travel author
- Simon Ramsay, Conservative politician and colonial governor
- Neil Ritchie, British army officer during the Second World War
- William Rose, screenwriter
- Bertie Snowball, golfer
- Rory Stewart, Scottish diplomat, Harvard professor and Conservative MP
- Frederick Tait, Scottish soldier and amateur golfer
- Peter Walls Lt General of the Rhodesian Army
- Arthur Wauchope, British soldier and colonial administrator
- Archibald Wavell, British field marshal during the Second World War

=== Recipients of the Victoria Cross ===
The following Black Watch servicemen were awarded the Victoria Cross:

- Francis Farquharson, Indian Mutiny Lucknow, 9 March 1858
- John Simpson, Indian Mutiny Fort Ruhya, 15 April 1858
- Alexander Thompson, Indian Mutiny Fort Ruhya, 15 April 1858
- James Davis, Indian Mutiny Fort Ruhya, 15 April 1858
- Edward Spence, Indian Mutiny Fort Ruhya, 15 April 1858
- William Gardner, Indian Mutiny Bareilly, 5 May 1858
- Walter Cook, Indian Mutiny Sissaya Ghat, 15 January 1859
- Duncan Millar, Indian Mutiny Sissaya Ghat, 15 January 1859
- Samuel McGaw, Ashanti War Amoaful, 31 January 1874
- Thomas Edwards, Egyptian Campaigns Tamaai, 13 March 1884
- John Ripley, First World War Rue du Bois, 9 May 1915
- David Finlay, First World War Rue du Bois, 9 May 1915
- Charles Melvin, First World War Istabulat, 21 April 1917
- Lewis Evans, First World War Zonnebeke, 4 October 1917
- Bill Speakman, Korean War, 4 November 1951

== Battle honours ==
- The battle honours consist of the combined battle honours of the 42nd Regiment and the 73rd Regiment, together with:
  - Guadaloupe 1759^{1}, Martinique 1762^{1}, Havannah^{1}, North America 1763–64, Mysore^{5}, Busaco³, Salamanca^{4}, South Africa 1846–47^{6}, 1851-2-3^{6} Tel-el-Kebir, Egypt 1882 '84, Kirbekan, Nile 1884–85, Paardeberg, South Africa 1899–1902
  - The Great War [25 battalions]: Retreat from Mons, Marne 1914 '18, Aisne 1914, La Bassée 1914, Ypres 1914 '17 '18, Langemarck 1914, Gheluvelt, Nonne Bosschen, Givenchy 1914, Neuve Chapelle, Aubers, Festubert 1915, Loos, Somme 1916 '18, Albert 1916, Bazentin, Delville Wood, Pozières, Flers-Courcelette, Morval, Thiepval, Le Transloy, Ancre Heights, Ancre 1916, Arras 1917 '18, Vimy 1917, Scarpe 1917 '18, Arleux, Pilckem, Menin Road, Polygon Wood, Poelcappelle, Passchendaele, Cambrai 1917 '18, St Quentin, Bapaume 1918, Rosières, Lys, Estaires, Messines 1918, Hazebrouck, Kemmel, Béthune, Scherpenberg, Soissonnais-Ourcq, Tardenois, Drocourt-Quéant, Hindenburg Line, Épéhy, St Quentin Canal, Beaurevoir, Courtrai, Selle, Sambre, France and Flanders 1914–18, Doiran 1917, Macedonia 1915–18, Egypt 1916, Gaza, Jerusalem, Tell'Asur, Megiddo, Sharon, Damascus, Palestine 1917–18, Tigris 1916, Kut al Amara 1917, Baghdad, Mesopotamia 1915–17
  - The Second World War: Defence of Arras, Ypres-Comines Canal, Dunkirk 1940, Somme 1940, St. Valery-en-Caux, Saar, Breville, Odon, Fontenay le Pesnil, Defence of Rauray, Caen, Falaise, Falaise Road, La Vie Crossing, Le Havre, Lower Maas, Venlo Pocket, Ourthe, Rhineland, Reichswald, Goch, Rhine, North-West Europe 1940 '44–45, Barkasan, British Somaliland 1940, Tobruk 1941, Tobruk Sortie, El Alamein, Advance on Tripoli, Medenine, Zemlet el Lebene, Mareth, Akarit, Wadi Akarit East, Djebel Roumana, Medjez Plain, Si Mediene, Tunis, North Africa 1941–43, Landing in Sicily, Vizzini, Sferro, Gerbini, Adrano, Sferro Hills, Sicily 1943, Cassino II, Liri Valley, Advance to Florence, Monte Scalari, Casa Fortis, Rimini Line, Casa Fabbri Ridge, Savio Bridgehead, Italy 1944–45, Athens, Greece 1944–45, Crete, Heraklion, Middle East 1941, Chindits 1944, Burma 1944
  - The Hook 1952, Korea 1952–53; Al Basrah, Iraq 2003; Second Battle of Fallujah, Iraq 2004

1. awarded 1909 for services of 42nd Regiment.
2. awarded 1914 for services of 42nd Regiment.
3. awarded 1910 for service of 42nd Regiment.
4. awarded 1951 for service of 42nd Regiment.
5. awarded 1889 for service of 73rd Regiment.
6. awarded 1882 for service of 73rd Regiment.

== Colonels-in-Chief ==
- 1912–1936: King George V
- 1937–2002: Queen Elizabeth the Queen Mother LG LT CI ONZ GCVO GBE CC RRC CD
- 2003–present: King Charles III

== Regimental colonels ==
Colonels of the regiment were:

The Black Watch (Royal Highlanders)

- 1881–1888 (1st Battalion): Gen. Sir Duncan Alexander Cameron (ex 42nd Foot)
- 1881–1885 (2nd Battalion): Gen. Sir Henry Robert Ferguson-Davie, Bt. (ex 73rd Foot)
- 1888–1907 (1st Battalion): Gen. Sir Robert Rollo
- 1907–1914: Lt-Gen. Sir John Chetham McLeod
- 1914–1929: Gen. Sir John Grenfell Maxwell
- 1929–1940: Gen. Sir Archibald Rice Cameron

The Black Watch (Royal Highland Regiment) (1935)

- 1940–1946: Gen. Sir Arthur Grenfell Wauchope
- 1946–1950: F.M. Sir Archibald Wavell, 1st Earl Wavell
- 1950–1952: Gen. Sir Neil Methuen Ritchie
- 1952–1960: Maj-Gen. Neil McMicking
- 1960–1964: Maj-Gen. Robert Keith Arbuthnott, 15th Viscount of Arbuthnott
- 1964–1969: Brig. Henry Conyers Baker-Baker
- 1969–1976: Brig. Rt. Hon. Bernard Edward Fergusson, Baron Ballantrae
- 1976–1981: Brig. John Cassels Montieth
- 1981–1992: Maj-Gen. Andrew Linton Watson
- 1992–2003: Brig. Garry Charles Barnett
- 2003–2006: Lt-Gen. Sir Alistair Stuart Hastings Irwin
- 2006: Regiment amalgamated with the Royal Scots, the King's Own Scottish Borderers, the Royal Highland Fusiliers, the Highlanders (Seaforth, Gordons and Camerons) and the Argyll and Sutherland Highlanders – to form the Royal Regiment of Scotland

== Alliances ==
The battalion has the following alliances:

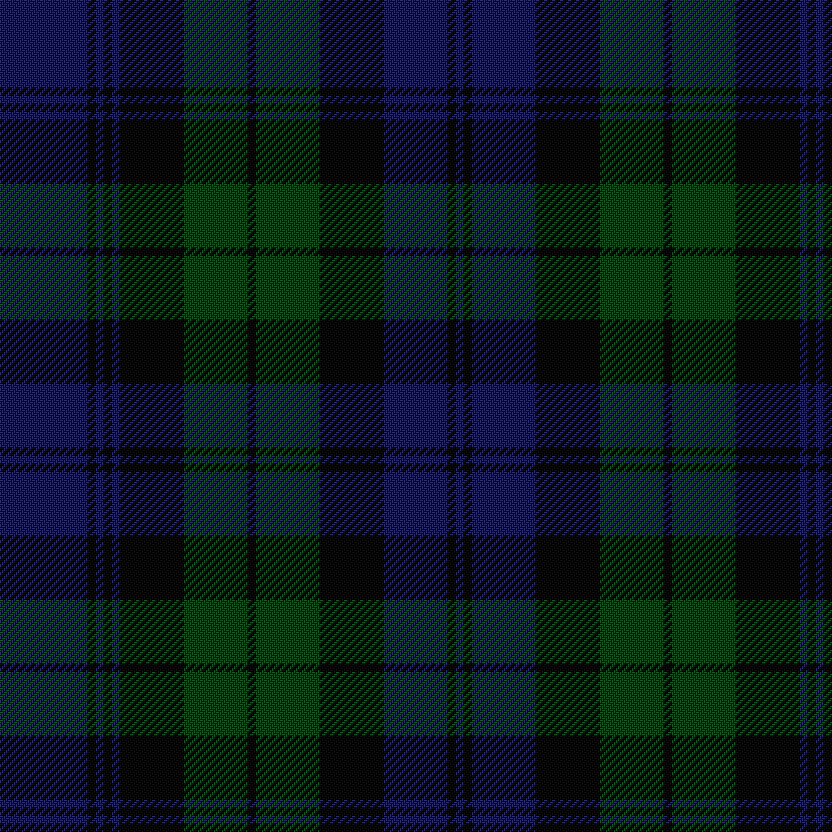
The Black Watch tartan.

- Australia – Australia – The Royal Queensland Regiment
- Australia – Australia – The Royal New South Wales Regiment
- Canada – Canada – The Black Watch (Royal Highland Regiment) of Canada
- Canada – Canada – 42nd Field Artillery Regiment (Lanark and Renfrew Scottish), RCA
- Canada – Canada – The Prince Edward Island Regiment (RCAC)
- South Africa – South Africa – Solomon Mahlangu Regiment
- Sri Lanka - Sri Lanka - Gemunu Watch
- Royal Navy – HMS Montrose

Before and after the Second World War, the Australian Militia, later renamed the Citizen Military Forces (CMF), included the 30th Battalion, New South Wales Scottish Regiment. This unit was affiliated with the Black Watch.

Canada (from 1862) has its own Black Watch, being raised as the 5th Battalion of the Canadian Militia, being renamed by 1914 as the 5th Regiment (Royal Highlanders of Canada). It adopted its current title, The Black Watch (Royal Highland Regiment) of Canada, prior to the Second World War, and saw action in both world wars.

New Zealand raised the New Zealand Scottish Regiment in 1939, which was allied to the Black Watch and disbanded in 2013.

== Anecdotes ==
When wearing the kilt, it is customary for troops to "go regimental" or "military practice", wearing no underwear. In 1997, a Black Watch soldier received wide press exposure because of windy conditions during a military ceremony in Hong Kong.

== In popular culture ==
- Anthems associated with the regiment include "Wha Saw the Forty-Second", ("Wha saw the Forty Twa") a reworking of the Jacobite song "Wha Wadna Fecht For Charlie", "The Gallant Forty Twa", and "Twa Recruiting Sergeants".
- In 2006, the National Theatre of Scotland premiered a new play, Black Watch, by Gregory Burke at the Edinburgh Festival Fringe. Compiled from interviews with former soldiers, the play dealt with the history of the regiment and in particular the recent deployment in Iraq.
- The regiment are lambasted in an Irish rebel song The Black Watch, recorded by various artists such as the Irish Brigade, the Fighting Men of Crossmaglen, Athenry and Shebeen, for their role in the Troubles. The lyrics speak of the Black Watch, "strolling down the Falls Road with riot guns and gas, terrorising women as they're coming out of Mass." (The tune is taken from the earlier song "The Gallant Forty-Twa".)
- The tabletop game BattleTech features a fictionalized version of the Black Watch known as the Royal Black Watch Regiment, serving as the bodyguard of the First Lord of the Star League and using the same insignia and motto as their real life counterparts.

== Gallery ==
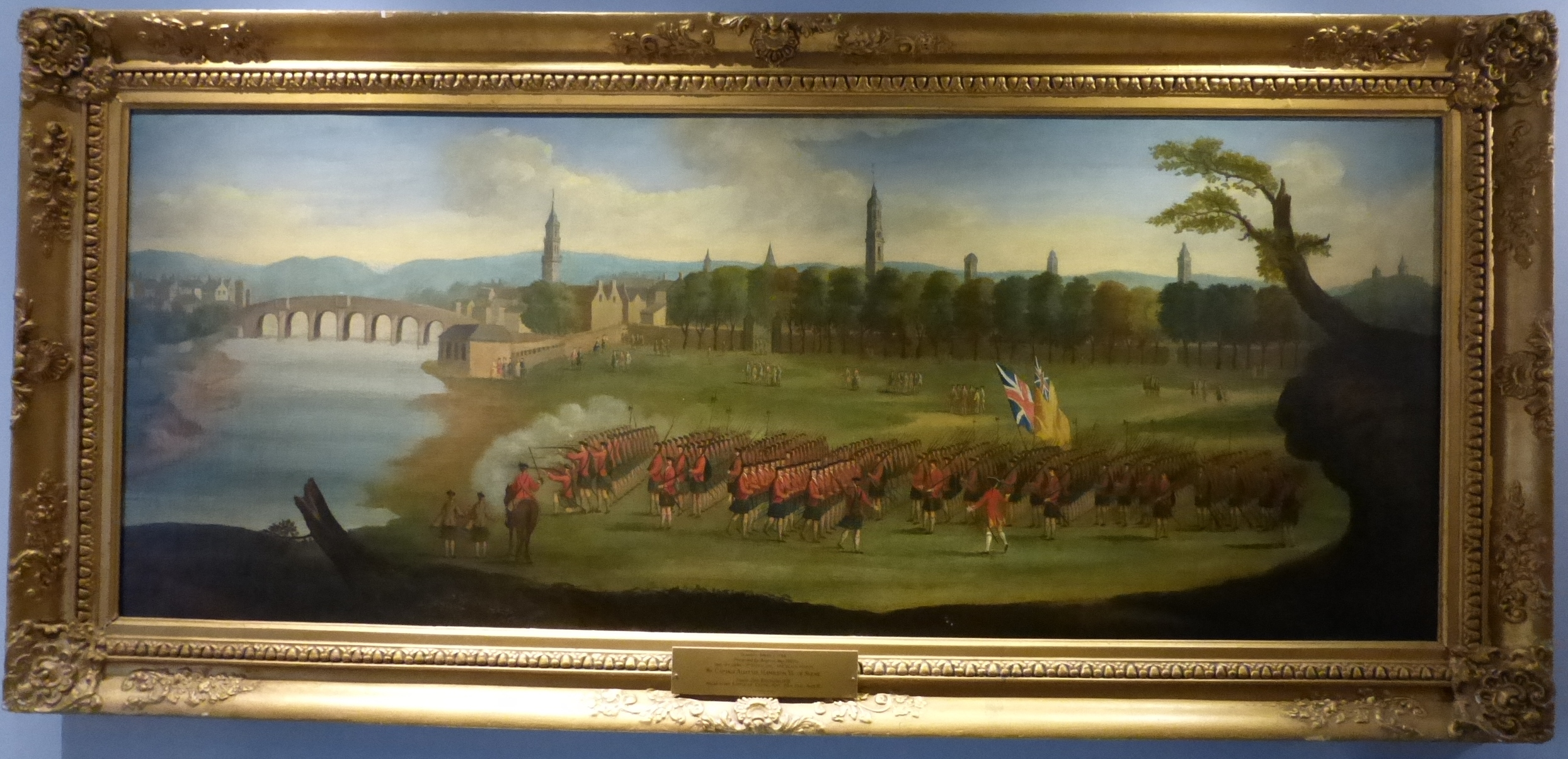
'Glasgow Green, c.1758'. A painting in the regimental museum showing a review of Black Watch recruits, c.1758'.

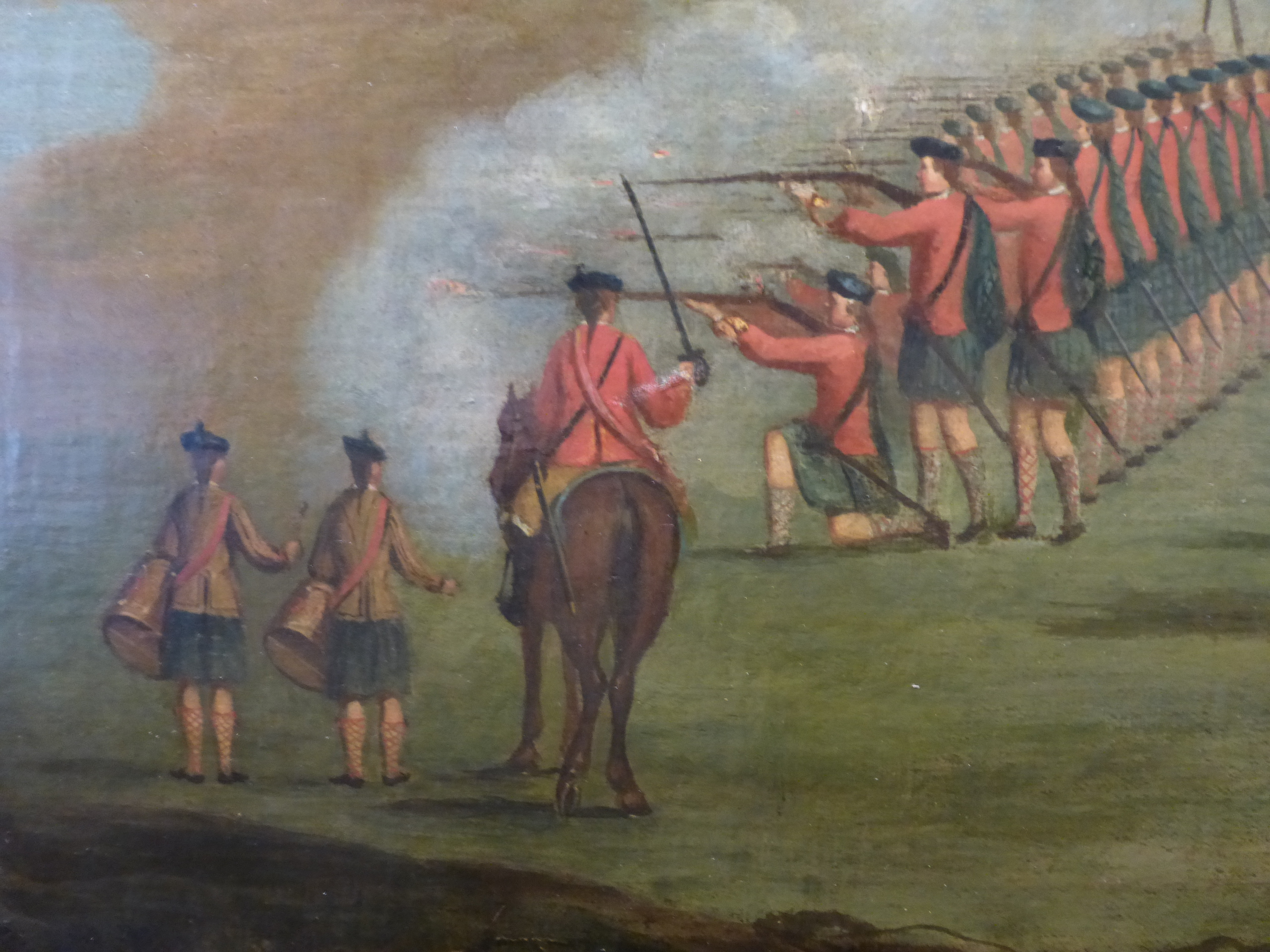
Detail from the painting 'Glasgow Green, c.1758'.

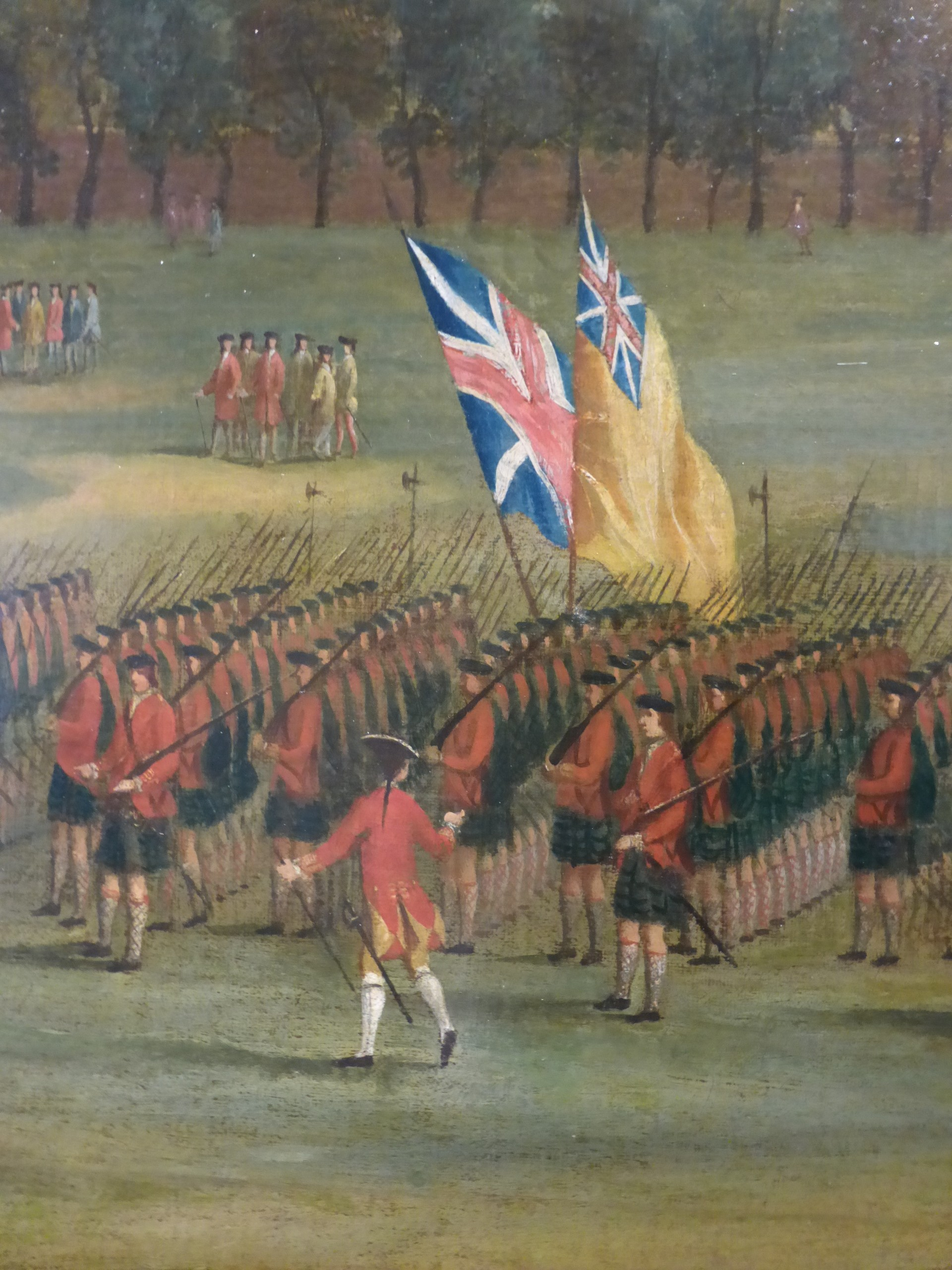
Detail from the painting 'Glasgow Green, c.1758'.

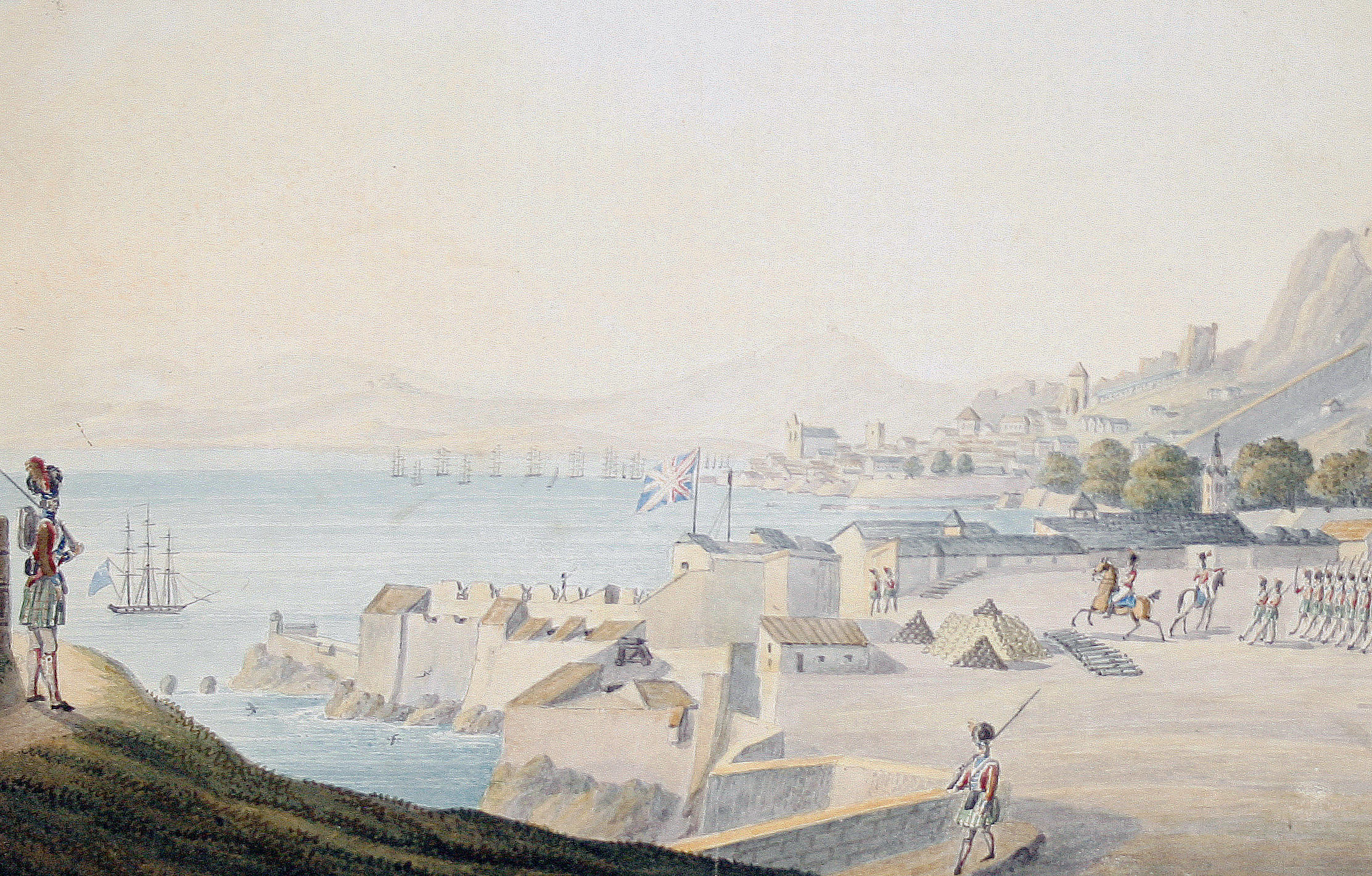
The Black Watch on Parade at Gibraltar.

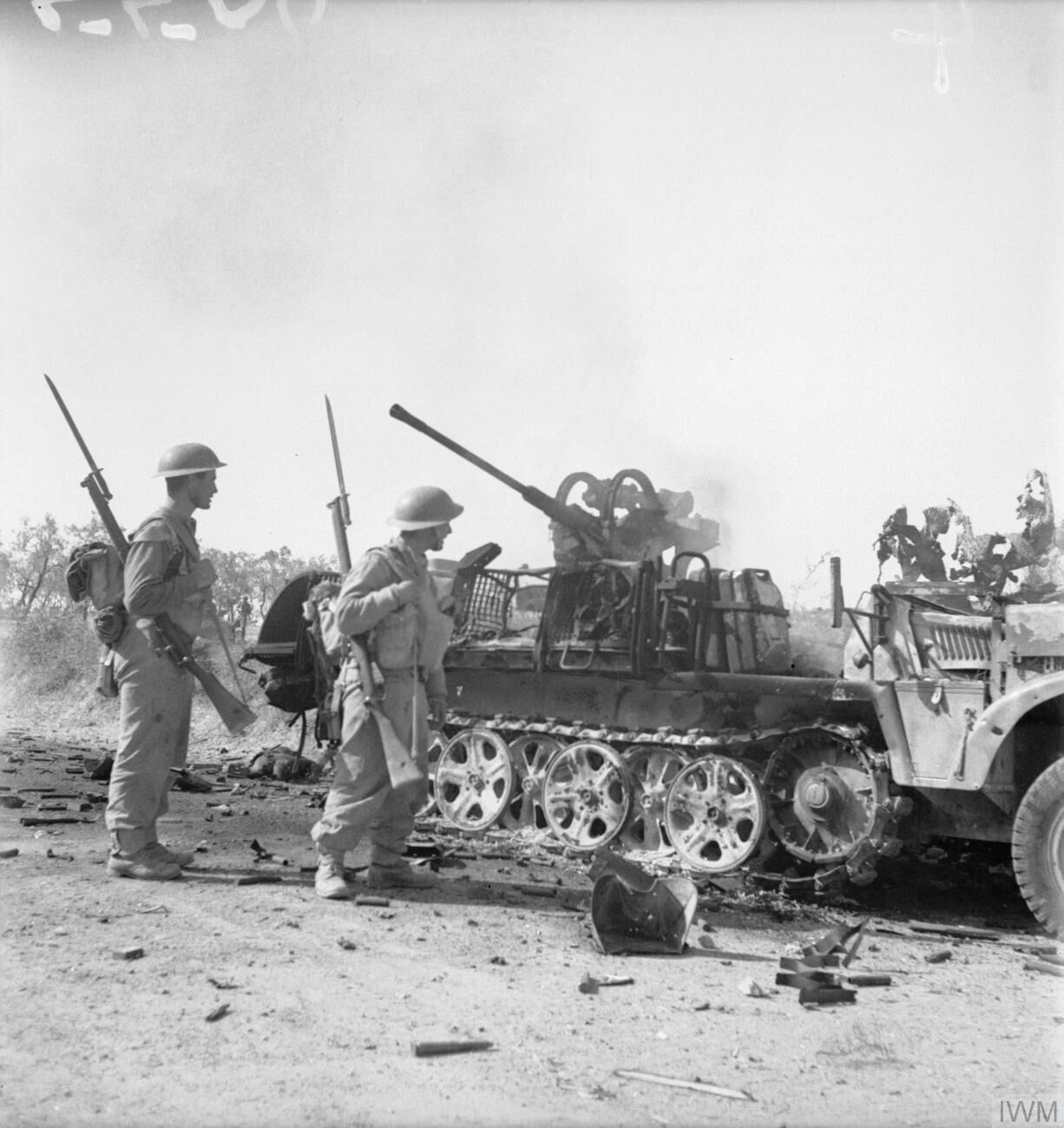
Black Watch soldiers pass by a burning German anti-aircraft half-track, Sicily, 5 August 1943.

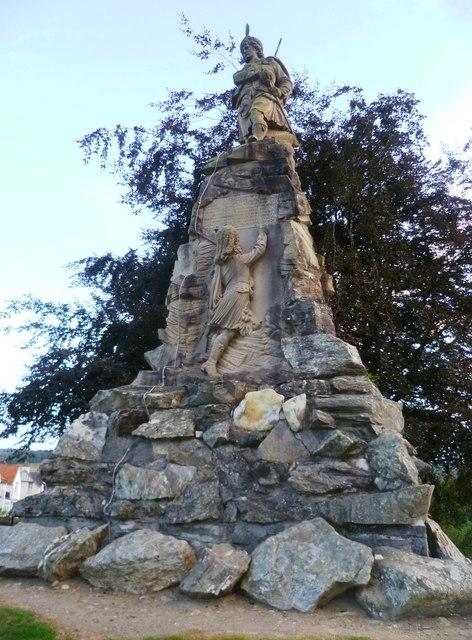
Black Watch Memorial, Aberfeldy.

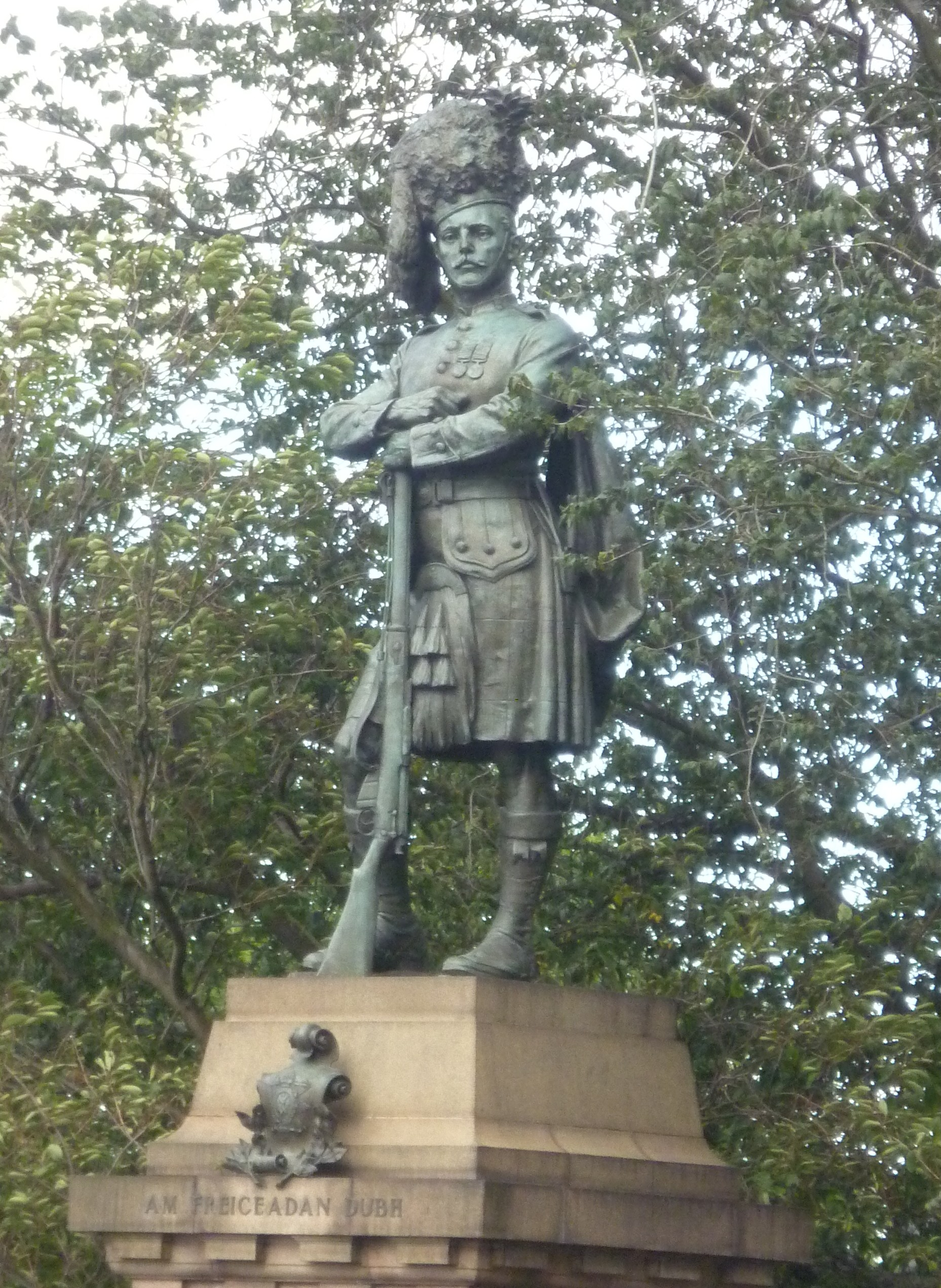
Black Watch South African Wars Memorial, Edinburgh.

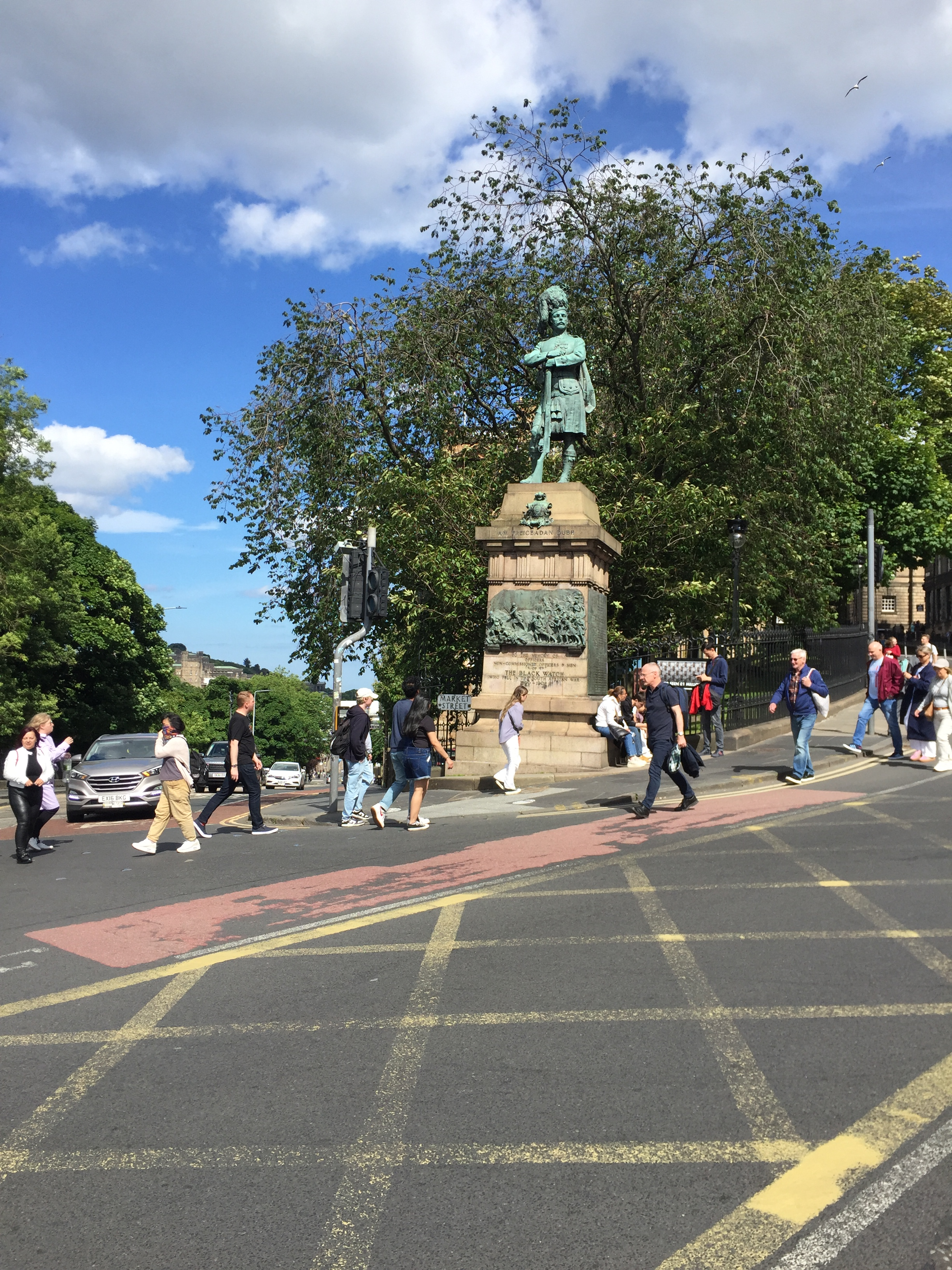
Black Watch monument, Edinburgh (June 2024)

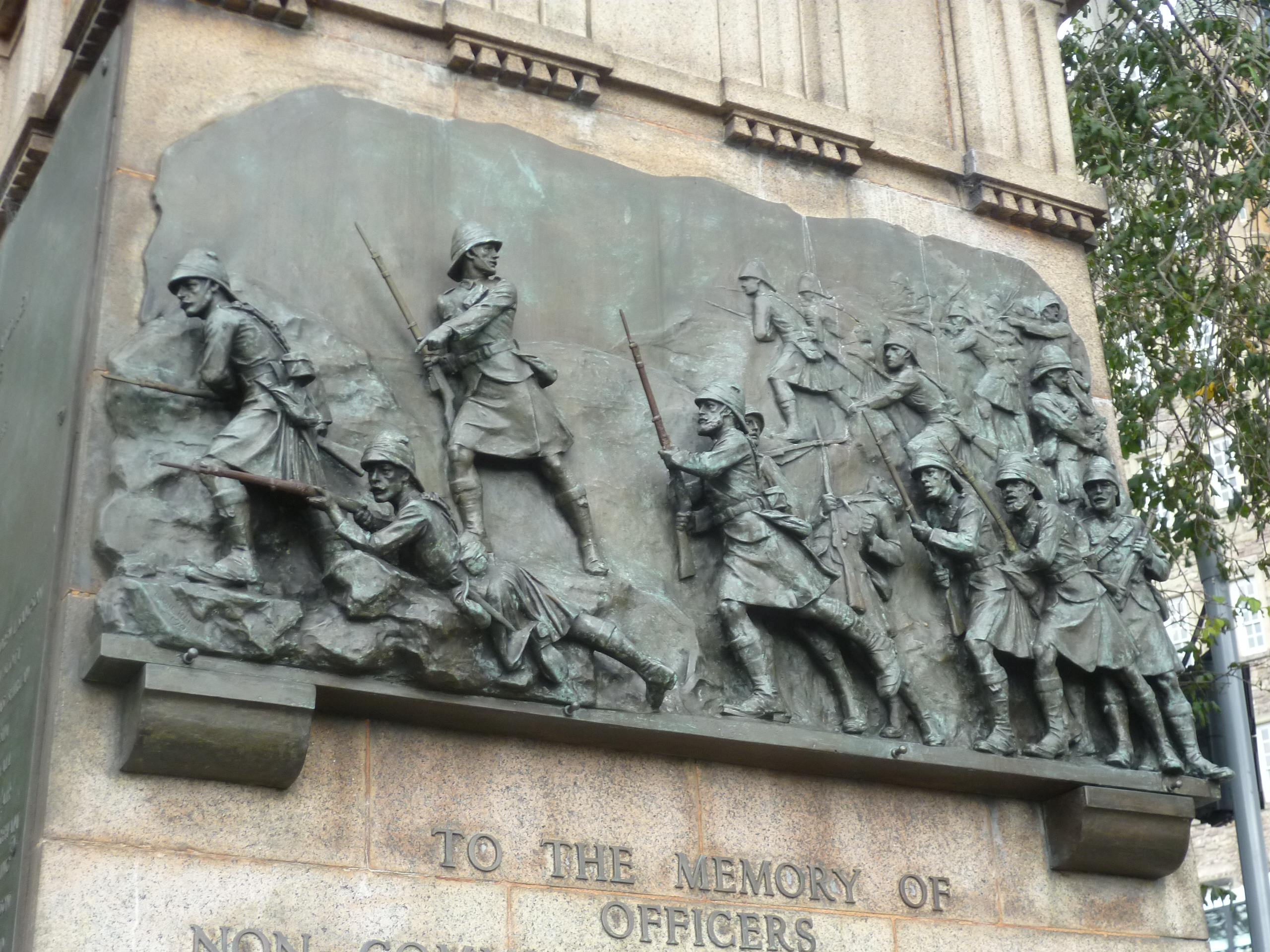

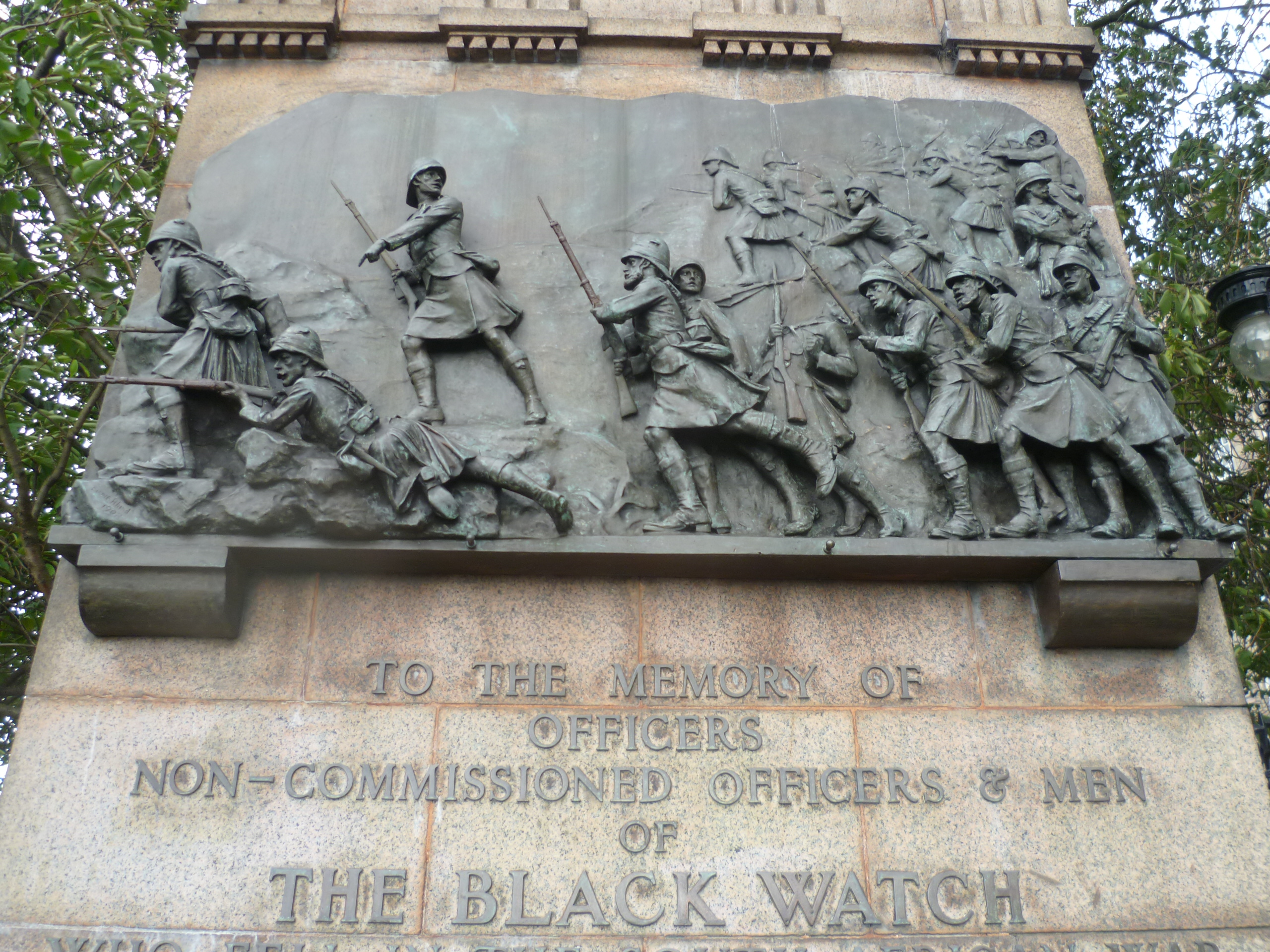
3 details from the Black Watch Memorial, Edinburgh.

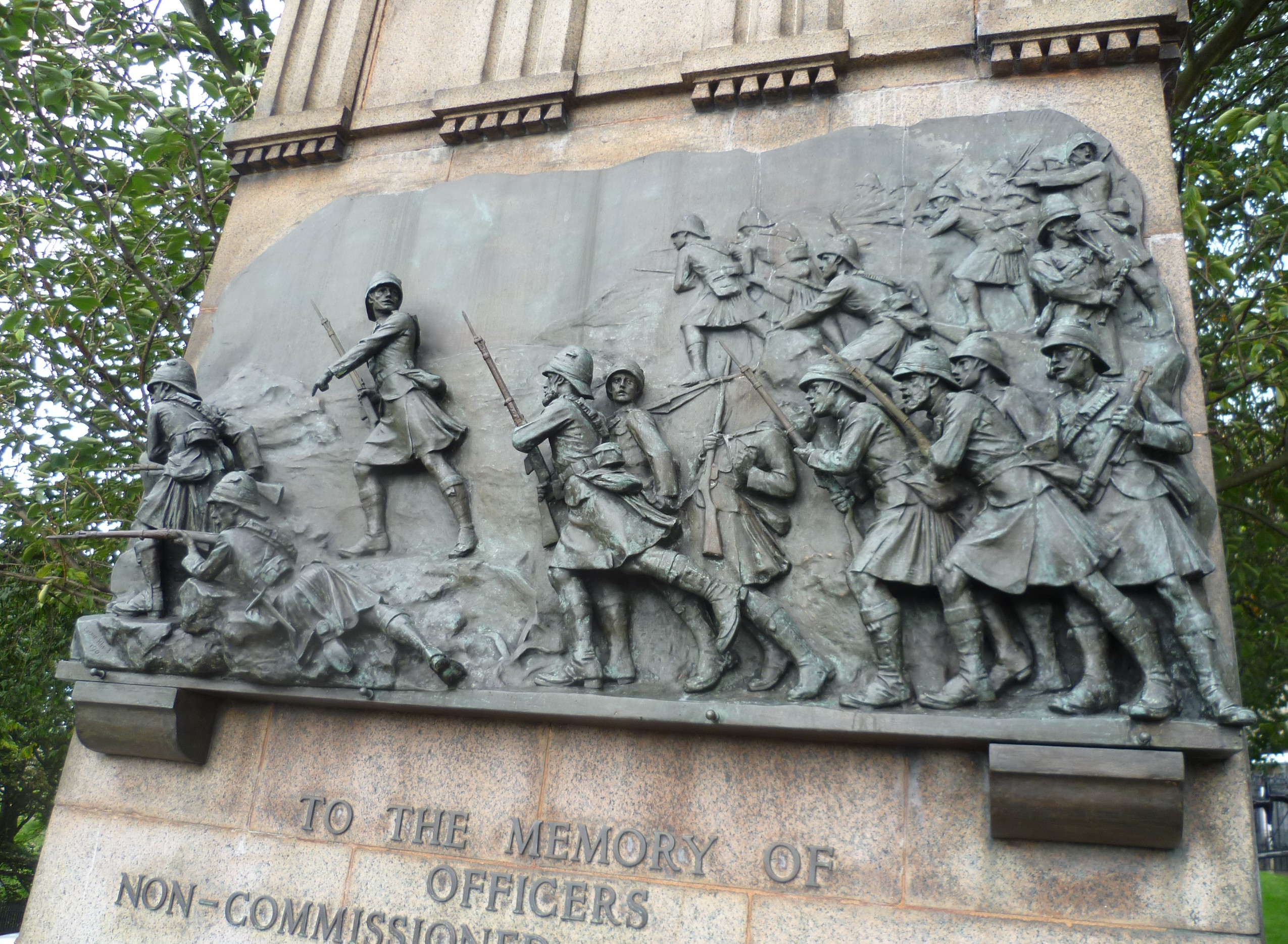

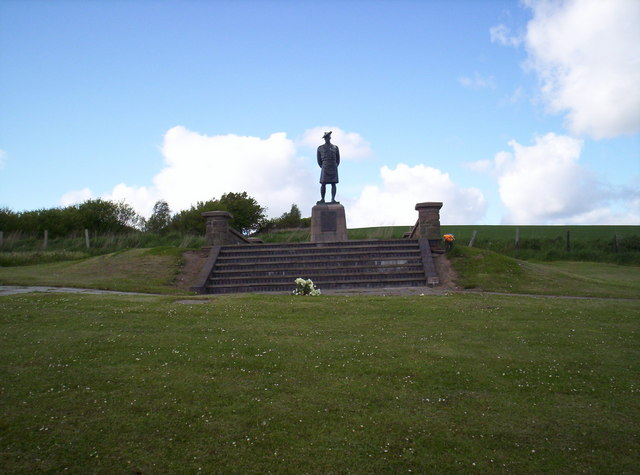
Black Watch Memorial on Powrie Brae near Dundee

== See also ==
- Armed forces in Scotland
- Military history of Scotland
- Lovat Scouts
- Foreign military units at the state funeral of John F. Kennedy

== Bibliography ==
- Burke, John (1959). Burke's Genealogical and Heraldic History of the Peerage, Baronetage, and Knightage Part 1. Burke's Peerage.
- Cokayne, Gorge Edward (1949). The Complete Peerage of England, Scotland, Ireland, Great Britain and the United Kingdom: Rickerton to Sisonby. St. Catherine Press.
- Campbell, Lady Colin (2013). The Untold Story of Queen Elizabeth, The Queen Mother. Arcadia Books. ISBN 978-1910050200.
- Copp, Terry (2007). The Brigade: The Fifth Canadian Infantry Brigade in World War II. Stackpole Books. ISBN 978-0-8117-3422-6.
- Edmonds, Sir James Edward Military (1922). Operations France and Belgium, 1914–1918. Vol. 2. Macmillan.
- Parker, John (2008). Black Watch. Headline Book Publishing. ISBN 978-0-7553-1348-8.
- Royle, Trevor (2011). The Black Watch A Concise History. Mainstream Publishing. ISBN 978-1780572543.
- Schofield, Victoria (2017). The Black Watch Fighting in the Frontline 1899–2006. Head of Zeus. ISBN 978-1784979966.
- Simpson, Peter (1996). The Independent Highland Companies, 1603–1760. Edinburgh: John Donald. ISBN 0-85976-432-X.
- Trevor-Roper, Hugh (2009). The Invention of Scotland. Yale University Press. ISBN 978-0-300-13686-9.
- Wauchope, Arthur Grenfell (1925). A History of The Black Watch (Royal Highlanders) in The Great War, 1914–1918, Volume Three: New Army. Eastbourne: Antony Rowe Ltd. ISBN 978-1-84734-573-8.
- Westlake, Ray (2004). British Battalions on the Somme. Pen and Sword. ISBN 978-1844680177.
