= Brocton, Staffordshire =

Village in Staffordshire, England

Coordinates: 52.7725°N 2.0487°W

Brocton
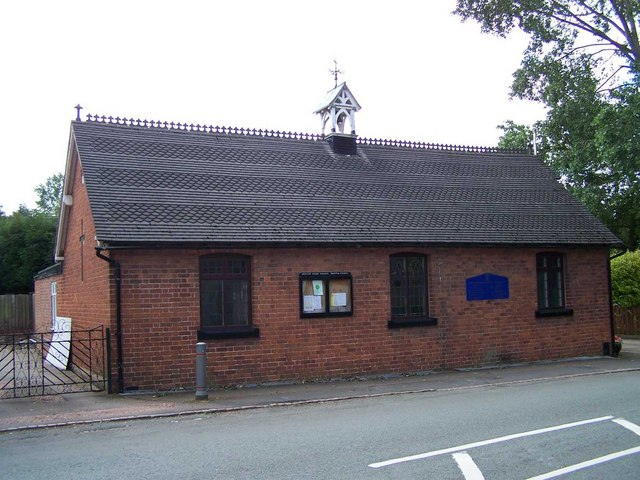
- The Parish Church of All Saints

- Location within Staffordshire
- Population: 1,082
- District: Stafford
- Shire county: Staffordshire
- Region: West Midlands
- Country: England
- Sovereign state: United Kingdom
- Post town: STAFFORD
- Postcode district: ST17
- Dialling code: 01785
- Police: Staffordshire
- Fire: Staffordshire
- Ambulance: West Midlands
- UK Parliament: Stone, Great Wyrley and Penkridge
- Website: https://broctonpc.co.uk

Brocton is a village and civil parish in the Borough of Stafford in Staffordshire, England. The village describes itself as the Gateway to Cannock Chase, an Area of Outstanding Natural Beauty and a Site of Special Scientific Interest. It is located about four miles (6 km) south-east of Stafford.

== Population ==
The 2011 census recorded a population of 1,082 in 445 Households.

== Description ==
The village is just outside the built-up area of Stafford, on the edge of Cannock Chase. The parish is one of the most affluent areas in Staffordshire and is an Area of Outstanding Natural Beauty (AONB). There is a single shop/post office and some of the most beautiful timber-framed houses in Staffordshire. Good examples can be seen in Park Lane and The Green. The parish has a football club, Brocton F.C., (formed in 1937), though they currently play in Stafford.

Near Brocton is Brocton Hall an early 19th-century Georgian mansion built in 1801 for Sir George Chetwynd. It now serves as a golf clubhouse

=== Brocton Military Training Camp ===
Brocton was once well known to servicemen as a World War I Military Training Camp, remnants of which can still be seen up at the top of Chase Road. J.R.R. Tolkien came to Staffordshire in August 1915 when he served his military training at an Army camp on the ancient forest and Royal hunting ground of Cannock Chase, Stafford. The military camp near Brocton was situated on the high ground of the 100 square miles (260 km^{2}) of the chase, with its rolling moorland, unusual rock formations, and far-reaching views leading to dense forest all around. In March 1916 Tolkien married Edith Bratt and they moved into accommodation in Great Haywood, a small village on the edge of the Chase. Walking from the camp to his wife's house at the Presbytery in Great Haywood, Tolkien would have passed through the many-changing wild landscapes of the chase and past the great sessile oaks of Brocton Coppice, many of which still stand at over 1000 years old.

As well as a centre where soldiers completed their basic training in the First World War, Brocton Camp also acted as a Prisoner of War Camp from 1917 until the end of the War. The prisoners were separated from the basic training area by barbed wire and fencing. It is estimated that by the time the war ended Brocton Camp housed estimates of between 5,000 and 6,500 prisoners which placed it on the more expansive end of Britain's POW camps in the First World War.

=== Model World War I battlefield ===
In September 2013 it was reported that Staffordshire County Council would excavate the World War I model battlefield near Brocton, which had been constructed by German Prisoners of War held in a camp on nearby Cannock Chase and guarded by soldiers of the New Zealand Rifle Brigade (Earl of Liverpool's Own). The model of the village and surrounding area of Messines in Belgium, which included replica trenches and dugouts, railway lines, roads, and accurate contours of the surrounding terrain, would be open to public view for a few weeks before being buried over again to ensure its preservation. The excavation is revealing amazing details of the 40 metre square battlefield, which is said to be perfectly preserved. "Staffordshire County Council will be using laser-scanning technology to re-create the site as a 3D interactive model that can be explored online."

== Notable people ==
- Sir George Chetwynd, 2nd Baronet of Brocton (1783-1850) MP for Stafford from 1820 to 1826
- William Henry Chetwynd (1811 - 1890 in Longdon Hall, Brocton) son of Sir George Chetwynd, 2nd Baronet, he was involved in a sensational divorce case in 1865.
- Jackie Oates (born 1983) an English folk singer and fiddle player, grew up in Brocton.
- Julia Macur (born 1957) Lady Justice of Appeal.

== See also ==
- Listed buildings in Brocton, Staffordshire
