= William Chetwynd =

William Chetwynd may refer to:

- William Chetwynd (MP for Wootton Bassett) (c. 1691–1744), British lawyer and politician
- William Chetwynd, 3rd Viscount Chetwynd (1684–1770), British politician, MP for Stafford, and for Plymouth
- William Richard Chetwynd (c. 1731–1765), English aristocrat and politician, MP for Stafford
- William Henry Chetwynd (1811–1890), involved in a sensational divorce case in 1865
