= Sir George Chetwynd, 2nd Baronet =

English politician

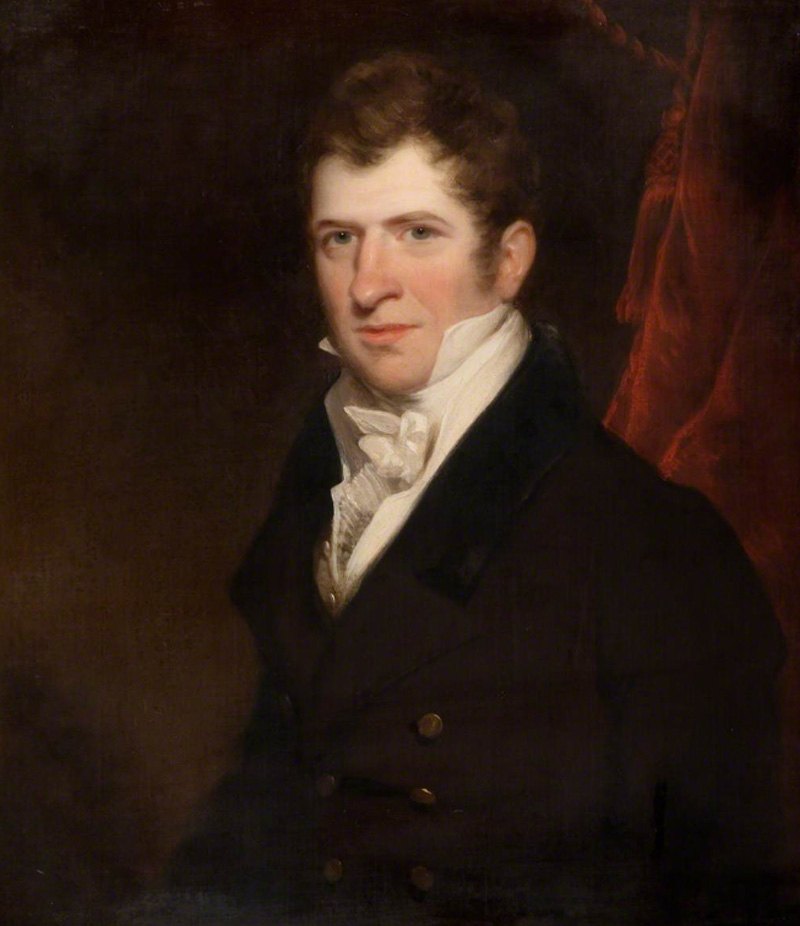
Sir George Chetwynd, 2nd Baronet

George Chetwynd (23 July 1783 – 24 May 1850), of Brocton Hall, near Stafford and Grendon Hall (demolished, 1933), near Atherstone, Warwickshire, was an English politician.

He was born the eldest son of Sir George Chetwynd, 1st Baronet of Brocton, Staffordshire and educated at Harrow School (1798-1802) and Brasenose College, Oxford (1802). He entered Lincoln's Inn in 1808 to study law and was called to the bar in 1813. He succeeded his father in 1824.

He was commissioned as Lieutenant-Colonel Commandant of the Central Regiment, Staffordshire Local Militia, on 9 April 1810. He was a Member of Parliament (MP) for Stafford from 1820 to 1826 and was appointed Sheriff of Warwickshire for 1828–29.

He died in 1850. He had married Hannah Maria, the daughter and coheiress of John Sparrow of Bishton Hall, Staffordshire and had 2 sons and 3 daughters. He was succeeded by Sir George Chetwynd, 3rd Baronet. His younger son William Henry Chetwynd was involved in a sensational divorce case in 1865.

Baronetage of Great Britain
Preceded by George Chetwynd	Baronet (of Brocton Hall); 1824–1850	Succeeded by George Chetwynd
