= Walter Cook (VC) =

- Born: 18 June 1834; London, England
- Died: 1864 (aged 29-30); India
- Military career
- Allegiance: United Kingdom
- Branch: British Army
- Rank: Private
- Units: 42nd Regiment of Foot
- Conflicts: Indian Mutiny
- Awards: Victoria Cross

Walter Cook VC (18 June 1834 – c. 1864) was an English recipient of the Victoria Cross, the highest and most prestigious award for gallantry in the face of the enemy that can be awarded to British and Commonwealth forces.

He was about 25 years old, and a private in the 42nd Regiment (later The Black Watch (Royal Highlanders), British Army during the Indian Mutiny when the following deed took place on 15 January 1859 at Maylah Ghat, India for which he and Private Duncan Millar were awarded the VC:

In the action at Maylah Ghaut, on the 15th January, 1859, Brigadier-General Walpole reports that the conduct of Privates Cook and Millar deserves to be particularly pointed out. At the time the fight was the severest, and the few men of the 42nd Regiment were skirmishing so close to the enemy (who were in great numbers), that some of the men were wounded by sword cuts, and the only officer with the 42nd was carried to the rear, severely wounded, and the Color-Serjeant was killed, these soldiers went to the front, took a prominent part in directing the Company, and displayed a courage, coolness, and discipline, which was the admiration of all who witnessed it.

— War-Office, "No. 22278". The London Gazette. 21 June 1859. p. 2420.

The pipe tune Lawson's Men was written about the incident.
