= Duncan Millar (VC) =

Recipient of the Victoria Cross

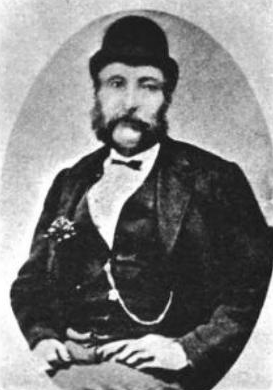
- Born: 19 June 1824; Kilmarnock, Ayrshire, Scotland
- Died: 15 July 1881 (aged 57); Glasgow, Scotland
- Military career
- Allegiance: United Kingdom
- Branch: British Army
- Rank: Private
- Units: 42nd Regiment of Foot
- Conflicts: Crimean War; Indian Mutiny
- Awards: Victoria Cross

Duncan Millar VC also known as Miller (19 June 1824 – 15 July 1881) was a Scottish recipient of the Victoria Cross, the highest and most prestigious British honour. The award was for gallantry in the face of the enemy.

He was 34 years old and a private in the 42nd Regiment, (later The Black Watch (Royal Highlanders), British Army during the Indian Mutiny when the following deed took place on 15 January 1859 at Maylah Ghat, British India for which he and Private Walter Cook were awarded the VC:

In the action at Maylah Ghaut, on the 15th January, 1859, Brigadier-General Walpole reports that the conduct of Privates Cook and Millar deserves to be particularly pointed out. At the time the fight was the severest, and the few men of the 42nd Regiment were skirmishing so close to the enemy (who were in great numbers), that some of the men were wounded by sword cuts, and the only officer with the 42nd was carried to the rear, severely wounded, and the Color-Serjeant was killed, these soldiers went to the front, took a prominent part in directing the Company, and displayed a courage, coolness, and discipline, which was the admiration of all who witnessed it.

His Victoria Cross is displayed at the National War Museum of Scotland, Edinburgh Castle, Edinburgh, Scotland.
