= Listed buildings in Brocton, Staffordshire =

Brocton is a civil parish in the Borough of Stafford, Staffordshire, England. It contains eight listed buildings that are recorded in the National Heritage List for England. All the listed buildings are designated at Grade II, the lowest of the three grades, which is applied to "buildings of national importance and special interest". The parish contains the village of Brocton and the surrounding area. The listed buildings consist of houses and cottages in the village, a country house and items in its grounds, and a military cemetery.

== Buildings ==
Name and location	Photograph	Date	Notes
Ruins northwest of Brocton Hall; 52.77596°N 2.05428°W	—	Medieval	The ruins, which have been moved from their original site, are in stone. They consist of a pointed Gothic arch, portions of window tracery, and gargoyles.
The Cottage; 52.77336°N 2.05144°W	—	Late 16th century (probable)	The house is timber framed with brick infill and a tile roof. There are two storeys and a front of three bays, the middle bay projecting and forming a gabled two-storey porch. The windows are casements.
The Black and White Cottage; 52.77237°N 2.04857°W		Late 16th or early 17th century	The cottage is timber framed with colourwashed brick infill and stone in the gable ends, and the roof is tiled. There is one storey and an attic, and two bays. The windows are casements, and there are two dormers.
Village Farmhouse; 52.77245°N 2.04998°W	—	Late 16th or early 17th century	The farmhouse has a timber framed core, and consists of a two-bay two-storey hall range and a two-storey cross-wing. The hall range was later rebuilt in brick, and the cross wing was rendered. The roof is tiled, in the angle is a massive chimney stack, and the windows are casements.
Bank Top Farmhouse; 52.77250°N 2.05197°W	—	Late 17th or early 18th century	The farmhouse is in brick on a sandstone plinth, with a storey band, and a tile roof with coped gable ends. There are two storeys, and a T-shaped plan, with a front range of four bays, and a rear wing. The windows are casements, and in the front range they are mullioned and transomed.
Dovecote, Brocton Hall; 52.77420°N 2.05555°W	—	18th century (probable)	The dovecote in the grounds of the hall is in brick with a pyramidal slate roof, and has an octagonal plan. It contains pointed and quatrefoil windows, and there is brick patterning below the parapet.
Brocton Hall; 52.77531°N 2.05386°W		Early 19th century	A country house, it was damaged by fire in 1939, resulting in the removal of the top storey, and later used for other purposes. The house is in rendered brick, and has a flat roof. There are two storeys and a basement, and a front of seven bays. The middle three bays project and are bowed, containing a porch with twelve giant Tuscan columns. The windows are sashes.
Cannock Chase German Military Cemetery; 52.73941°N 2.02202°W	—	1959–67	The cemetery, in Cannock Chase, contains a building in grey-buff brick, sandstone and concrete. This consists of a rectangular central range, with caretaker's accommodation to left, a semi-enclosed terrace beyond, a cloister link to a square Hall of Honour, with the cemetery and the Zeppelin Terrace further beyond. In the Zeppelin Terrace are four stone slabs commemorating the four crews of Zeppelins downed in the First World War.
