= William Henry Chetwynd =

William Henry Chetwynd (17 September 1811 – 5 July 1890) was a son of Sir George Chetwynd, 2nd Baronet. He lived at Longdon Hall, Rugeley, in Staffordshire and was involved in a sensational divorce case in 1865.

He had married Blanche Chetwynd-Talbot, daughter of Rev. Hon. Arthur Chetwynd-Talbot and the niece of Henry Chetwynd-Talbot, 18th Earl of Shrewsbury, in 1854: he was 42 and she was 18. In 1865 she brought a successful action for divorce under the Matrimonial Causes Act 1857 accusing him of cruelty and adultery, he counter-claiming that she had also committed adultery, fornication and incest. Their children were put in the care of William's elder brother Sir George Chetwynd, 3rd Baronet.

Chetwynd married for the second time in 1875 Mary Parkin, daughter of James Parkin. He died in 1890 at his home, Longdon Hall, Brocton, Staffordshire and was buried at nearby Colwich.
