= Brocton Hall =

Country house in Brocton, Stafford, Staffordshire, England

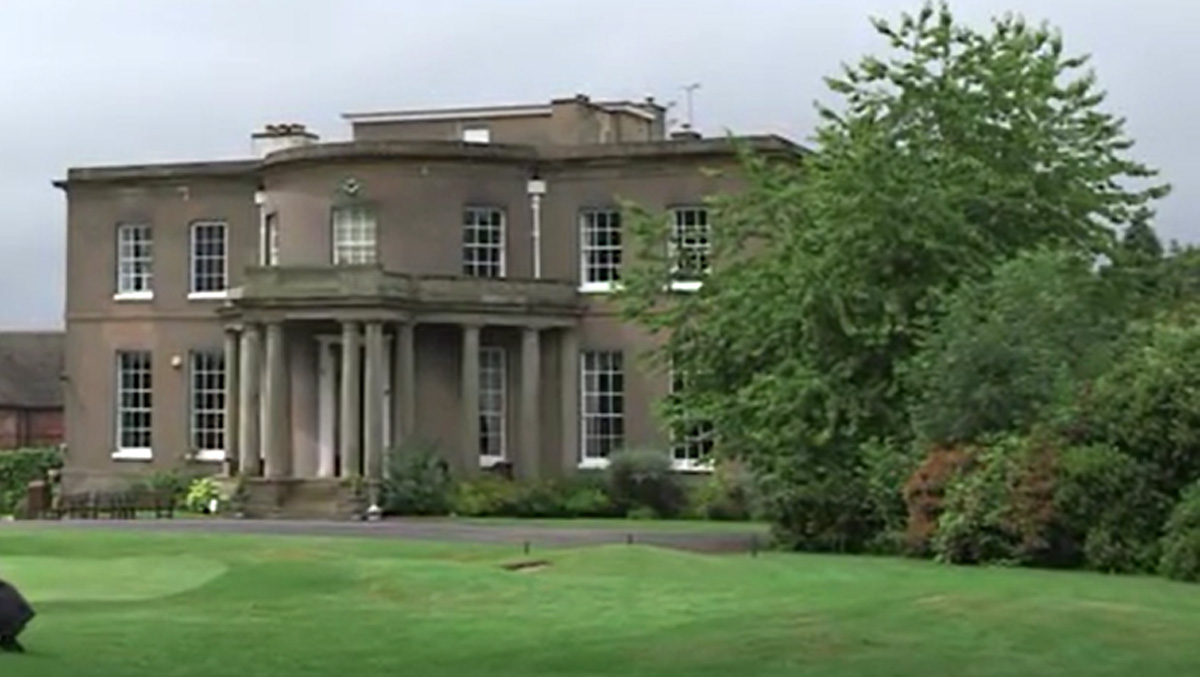
Brocton Hall

Brocton Hall is a building of historical significance and is listed on the English Heritage Register. It was built in 1760 by William Chetwynd and remained in the Chetwynd family until 1923 when it was sold to the Golf Club. Today the building is still used as a clubhouse and is also a venue for weddings.

== The early history ==
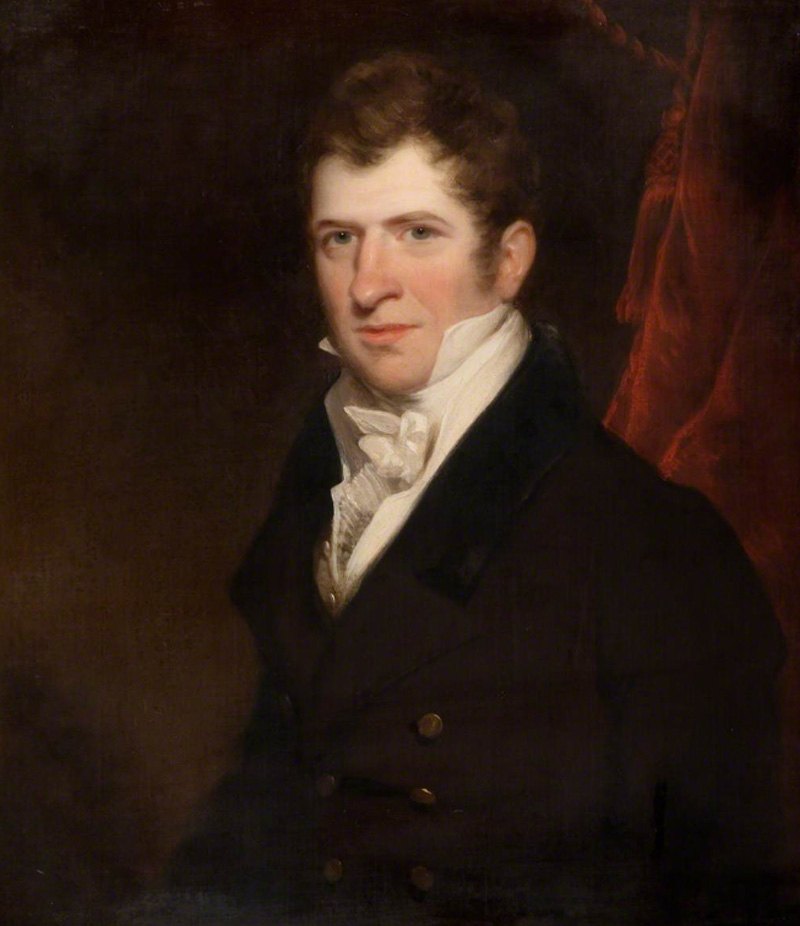
Sir George Chetwynd (1783-1850)

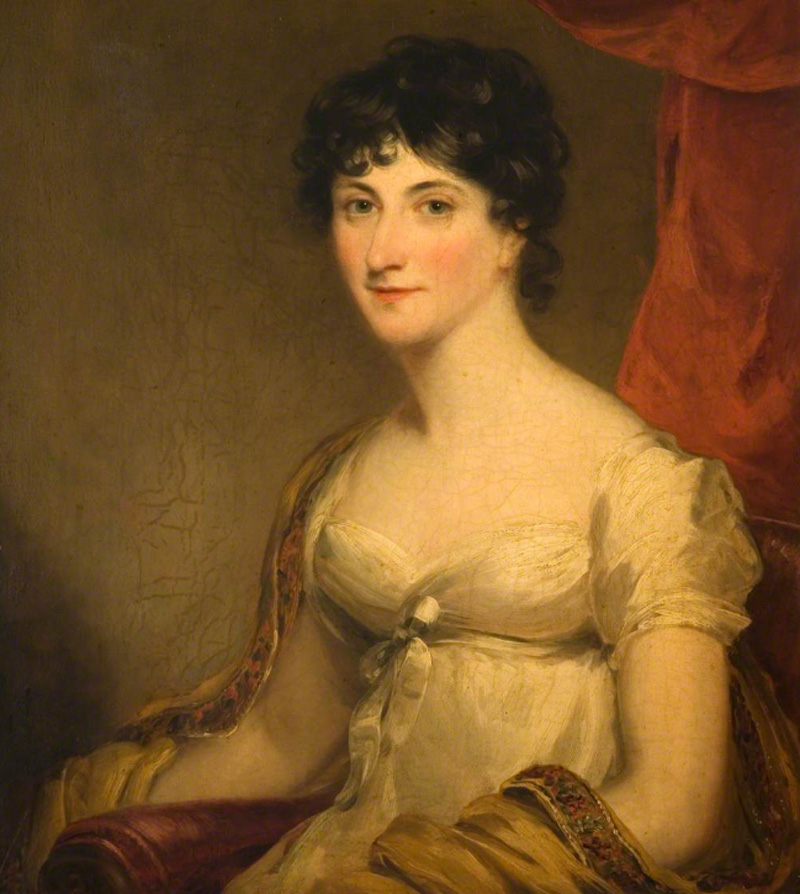
Lady Hannah Chetwynd (1780-1860)

William Chetwynd (1704-1778) built Brocton Hall in 1760 after demolishing the old manor house. His father was Walter Chetwynd (1663-1750) and his mother was Mary Sneyd (1671-1760). There are memorial plaques to each of them in Holy Trinity Church, Baswich. His great uncle Sir Walter Chetwynd had purchased the Brocton Hall estate and given it to William's father.

In 1738 William married Martha St Armand (1705-1774) who was the daughter of James St Armand of St Paul's Covent Garden, Middlesex. The couple had two sons. When William died in 1778 his son Sir George Chetwynd inherited Brocton Hall.

Sir George Chetwynd (1739-1824) was born in 1739 in Westminster. For many years he was Clerk in his Majesty's Privy Council. In 1783 he married Jane Bantin. In 1798 he inherited the estate of Grendon Hall, Warwickshire. In about 1801 he made additions to Brocton Hall and soon after this he appears to have moved to Grendon Hall and allowed his son Sir George Chetwynd (1783-1850) and his new bride Hannah Maria Sparrow (1780-1860) to live in the house. The marriage had taken place in 1804 and the couple appear to have lived at Brocton Hall until about 1824. Hannah was the daughter of John Sparrow of Bishton Hall.

In about 1815 the famous artist William Owen was commissioned to paint members of both the Chetwynd and Sparrow families. The portraits of Sir George and Hannah are shown.

Sir George was for many years a barrister and Member of Parliament. His father died in 1824 and he inherited Grendon Hall. However Brocton Hall was left to his younger brother Major William Fawkener (1788-1873).

== Later residents ==
Major William Fawkener Chetwynd (1788-1873) was educated at Brasenose College, Oxford and obtained a commission in the 1st Life Guards. For many years he was a Member of Parliament for Stafford. He retired in 1841. In 1843 he married Mary Anne Mosely, fourth daughter of Sir Oswald Mosely of Rolleston Hall. The couple had three sons and two daughters. The 1871 Census records them as living at Brocton Hall with two of their children, a butler, a housekeeper, a lady's maid, two housemaids, a page and a dairymaid.

When William died in 1873 his eldest son William Chetwynd (1848-1888) who was a barrister inherited the house. He did not marry so when he died in 1888 his younger brother Charles Chetwynd became the owner.

Charles Chetwynd (1851-1895) was a magistrate of Staffordshire. In 1888 he married Mary Jane Meakin (1860-1948) who was the daughter of George Meakin of Creswell Hall, Staffordshire. He was the wealthy owner of the famous pottery firm J. & G. Meakin who were later merged with Wedgwood. The couple had two daughters and one son. The daughters Beatrice and Mildred did not marry and lived at Brocton Hall with their parents. Charles died in 1895 and left the property to his wife Mary. She continued to live in the house with her daughters until 1923 when it was sold to the Golf Club. At this time it was a three-storey building in need of repair and there was no electricity and no heating. It was converted into a comfortable club house with accommodation on the top two floors.

In 1939 plumbers repairing the lead guttering accidentally started a fire that destroyed the top storey and damaged other areas. It was impracticable to rebuild in wartime and the building was repaired to leave the two storey building we see today.

== See also ==
- Listed buildings in Brocton, Staffordshire
