= List of Scottish Victoria Cross recipients =

The following people are Scottish recipients of the Victoria Cross.

== A ==
- Robert Bellew Adams – 1897; Nawa Kili, India
- Frederick Robertson Aikman – 1858; Amethi, India
- Robert Hope Moncrieff Aitken – 1857; Lucknow, India
- William Anderson – 1915; Neuve Chapelle, France
- William Herbert Anderson – 1918; Bois Favieres, France
- William Angus – 1915; Givenchy, France
- Adam Archibald – 1918; Ors, France

== B ==
- William Babtie – 1899; Battle of Colenso, South Africa
- Thomas Beach – 1854; Battle of Inkerman, Crimea
- William Davidson Bissett – 1918; Maing, France
- James Blair – 1857; Neemuch, India
- Robert Blair – 1857; Bolandshahr, India
- Frank Blaker – 1944; Taunghi, Burma (now Myanmar)
- William Bloomfield – 1916; Miali, Tanganyika (now Tanzania)
- Andrew Cathcart Bogle – 1857; Oonao, India
- Stanley Boughey – 1917; El Burf, Palestine
- Walter Lorrain Brodie – 1914; Becelaere, Belgium
- James Anson Otho Brooke – 1914; Gheluvelt, Belgium
- William Bruce – 1914; Givenchy, France
- John Crawford Buchan – 1918; Marteville, France

== C ==
- Thomas Cadell – 1857; Delhi, India
- Thomas Caldwell – 1918; Oudenaarde, Belgium
- Aylmer Cameron – 1858; Kotah, India
- Donald Cameron – 1943; Kåfjord, Alta, Norway
- Jock Campbell – 1941; Sidi Rezegh, Libya
- John Vaughan Campbell – 1916; Ginchy, France
- Kenneth Campbell – 1941; Brest, France
- Lorne MacLaine Campbell – 1943; Wadi Akarit, Tunisia
- John Carmichael – 1917; Zwarteleen, Belgium
- John Alexander Christie – 1917; Fejja, Palestine
- William Clamp – 1917; Poelkapelle, Belgium
- Hugh Cochrane – 1858; Jhansi, India
- John Cook – 1878; Peiwar Kotal, Afghanistan
- James Craig – 1855; Sebastopol, Crimea
- John Manson Craig – 1917; Egypt
- John Cruickshank – 1944; Atlantic
- Arthur Cumming – 1942; Kuantan, Malaya
- William Montgomery-Cuninghame – 1854; Sebastopol, Crimea

== D ==
- James Davis – 1858; Fort Ruhya, India
- James Lennox Dawson – 1915; Hohenzollern Redoubt, France
- John Daykins – 1918; Solesmes, France
- William Dick-Cunyngham – 1879; Sherpur Pass, Afghanistan
- Robert Digby-Jones – 1900; Ladysmith, South Africa
- Angus Douglas-Hamilton – 1915; Hill 70, France
- Robert Downie – 1916; Lesboeufs, France
- James Dundas – 1865; Dewan-Giri, India
- Alexander Murray, 8th Earl of Dunmore – 1897; Nawa Kili, India
- Robert Dunsire – 1915; Hill 70, France

== E ==
- Alexander Edwards – 1917; Ypres, Belgium
- John MacLaren Erskine – 1916; Givenchy, France
- Samuel Evans – 1855; Sebastopol, Crimea

== F ==
- Donald Dickson Farmer – 1900; Nooitgedacht, South Africa
- Francis Farquharson – 1858; Lucknow, India
- Alexander Murray, Viscount Fincastle – 1897; Nawa Kili, India
- George Findlater – 1897; Dargai Heights, India
- George Findlay – 1918; Catillon, France
- David Finlay – 1915; Rue du Bois, France
- Samuel Frickleton – 1917; Messines, Belgium (in NZEF)

== G ==
- William Gardner – 1858; Bareilly, India
- William Eagleson Gordon – 1900; Krugersdorp, South Africa
- John Reginald Noble Graham – 1917; Battle of Istabulat, Mesopotamia
- Charles James William Grant – 1891; Thobal, Burma (now Myanmar)
- John Grieve – 1854; Balaclava, Crimea

== H ==
- John Brown Hamilton – 1917; Ypres-Menin Road, Belgium
- Thomas de Courcy Hamilton – 1855; Sebastopol, Crimea
- John Hannah – 1940; Antwerp, Belgium
- Arthur Henderson – 1917; Fontaine-les-Croiselles, France
- George Stuart Henderson – 1920; Hillah, Mesopotamia
- Herbert Stephen Henderson – 1896; Bulawayo, Rhodesia (now Zimbabwe)
- Anthony Dickson Home – 1857; Lucknow, India
- William Hope – 1855; Sebastopol, Crimea
- James Palmer Huffam – 1918; St. Servin's Farm, France
- David Ferguson Hunter – 1918; Moeuvres, France
- Thomas Peck Hunter – 1945; Lake Comacchio, Italy

== I ==
- James John McLeod Innes – 1858; Sultanpore, India

== J ==
- Charles Alfred Jarvis – 1914; Jemappes, Belgium
- William Henry Johnston – 1914; Missy, France

== K ==
- Charles Thomas Kennedy – 1900; Dewetsdorp, South Africa
- Allan Ebenezer Ker – 1918; St. Quentin, France
- William Alexander Kerr – 1857; Kolapore, India
- Geoffrey Charles Tasker Keyes – 1941; Beda Littoria, Libya
- John Simpson Knox – 1854; Battle of the Alma, Crimea

== L ==
- Daniel Laidlaw – 1915; Loos, France
- David Ross Lauder – 1915; Gallipoli, Tunisia
- Peter Leitch – 1855; Sebastopol, Crimea
- James Leith – 1858; Betwa, India
- Robert James Lindsay – 1854; Battle of the Alma, Crimea
- Frederick Luke – 1914; Le Cateau, France
- Charles Lumley – 1855, Sebastopol, Crimea
- Charles Antony, The Lord, Lyell – 1943; Dj Bou Arada, Tunisia

== M ==
- Henry MacDonald – 1855; Sebastopol, Crimea
- David Lowe MacIntyre – 1918; Henin, France
- Donald MacIntyre – 1872; Lalgnoora, India
- David MacKay – 1857; Lucknow, India
- John Frederick MacKay – 1900; Johannesburg, South Africa
- James MacKenzie – 1914; Rouges Bancs, France
- John Mackenzie – 1900; Dompoassi, Ashanti (now Ghana)
- Donald MacKintosh – 1917; Fampoux, France
- Hector Lachlan Stewart MacLean – 1897; Nawa Kili, India
- Herbert Macpherson – 1857; Lucknow, India
- Hugh Malcolm – 1942; Chougui, Tunisia
- John Malcolmson – 1857; Battle of Khoosh-ab, Persia
- Henry May – 1914; La Boutillerie, France
- John McAulay – 1917; Fontaine Notre Dame, France
- William McBean – 1858; Lucknow, India
- Robert McBeath – 1917; Cambrai, France
- John McDermond – 1854; Battle of Inkerman, Crimea
- John McDougall – 1860; Taku Forts, China
- Samuel McGaw – 1874; Battle of Amoaful, Ashanti (now Ghana)
- David Stuart McGregor – 1918; Hoogemolen, Belgium
- Roderick McGregor – 1855; Sebastopol, Crimea
- Louis McGuffie – 1918; Wytschaete, Belgium
- Hugh McInnes – 1857; Lucknow, India
- George McIntosh – 1917; Ypres, Belgium
- Hugh McIver – 1918; Courcelle-le Compte, France
- James McKechnie – 1854; Battle of the Alma, Crimea
- John McNeill – 1864; Ohaupu, New Zealand
- Stewart McPherson – 1857; Lucknow, India
- James McPhie – 1918; Aubencheul-au-Bac, France
- John Meikle – 1918; Marfaux, France
- Maury Meiklejohn – 1899; Battle of Elandslaagte, South Africa
- Charles Melvin – 1917; Battle of Istabulat, Mesopotamia
- Anthony Miers – 1942; Corfu Harbour, Greece
- Duncan Millar (or Miller) – 1859; Maylah Ghat, India
- James Miller – 1857; Futtehpore, India
- James Munro (VC) – 1857; Lucknow, India

== O ==
- John O'Neill (or O'Niell) – 1918; Moorseele, Belgium

== P ==
- James Park – 1857; Lucknow, India
- George Henry Tatham Paton – 1917; Gonnelieu, France
- John Paton – 1857; Lucknow, India
- John Perie – 1855; Sebastopol, Crimea
- James Dalgleish Pollock – 1915; Hohenzollern Redoubt, France
- Patrick Anthony Porteous – 1942; Dieppe, France

== R ==
- Henry Ramage – 1854; Balaclava, Crimea
- Harry Sherwood Ranken – 1914; Haute-Avesnes, France
- William Reid – 1943; Düsseldorf, Germany
- William Rennie – 1857; Lucknow, India
- William Reynolds (VC) – 1854; Battle of the Alma, Crimea
- James Cleland Richardson – 1916; Battle of the Ancre Heights, France
- John Ripley – 1915; Rue du Bois, France
- Henry Peel Ritchie – 1914; Dar es Salaam, Tanganyika (now Tanzania)
- Walter Potter Ritchie – 1916; Beaumont Hamel, France
- William Robertson – 1899; Battle of Elandslaagte, South Africa
- George Rodgers – 1858; Marar, India
- John Ross (VC) – 1855; Sebastopol, Crimea

== S ==
- George McKenzie Samson – 1915; Gallipoli, Turkey
- George Sellar – 1879; Asmai Heights, Afghanistan
- Same (John) Shaw – 1858; Lucknow, India
- John Simpson – 1858; Fort Ruhya, India
- John Kendrick Skinner – 1917; Wijdendrift, Belgium
- Archibald Bisset Smith – 1917; Atlantic
- David Spence – 1858; Shunsabad, India
- Edward Spence – 1858; Fort Ruhya, India
- George Stewart – 1857; Lucknow, India
- James Stokes – 1945; Kervenheim, Germany

== T ==
- James Edward Tait – 1918; Amiens, France
- Alexander Thompson – 1858; Fort Ruhya, India
- George Thompson – 1945; Dortmund-Ems Canal, Germany
- Ross Tollerton – 1914; Battle of the Aisne, France
- James Youll Turnbull – 1916; Authuille, France

== V ==
- William John Vousden – 1879; Asmai Heights, Afghanistan

== W ==
- Samuel Thomas Dickson Wallace – 1917; Gonnelieu, France
- Joseph Watt – 1917; Straits of Otranto, Italy
- George Wilson – 1914; Verneuill, France
- John Augustus Wood – 1856; Bushire, Persia

== Y ==
- William Young – 1915; Fonquevillers, France
- David Reginald Younger – 1900; Krugersdorp, South Africa
