= William Martin Cafe =

Recipient of the Victoria Cross (1826–1906)

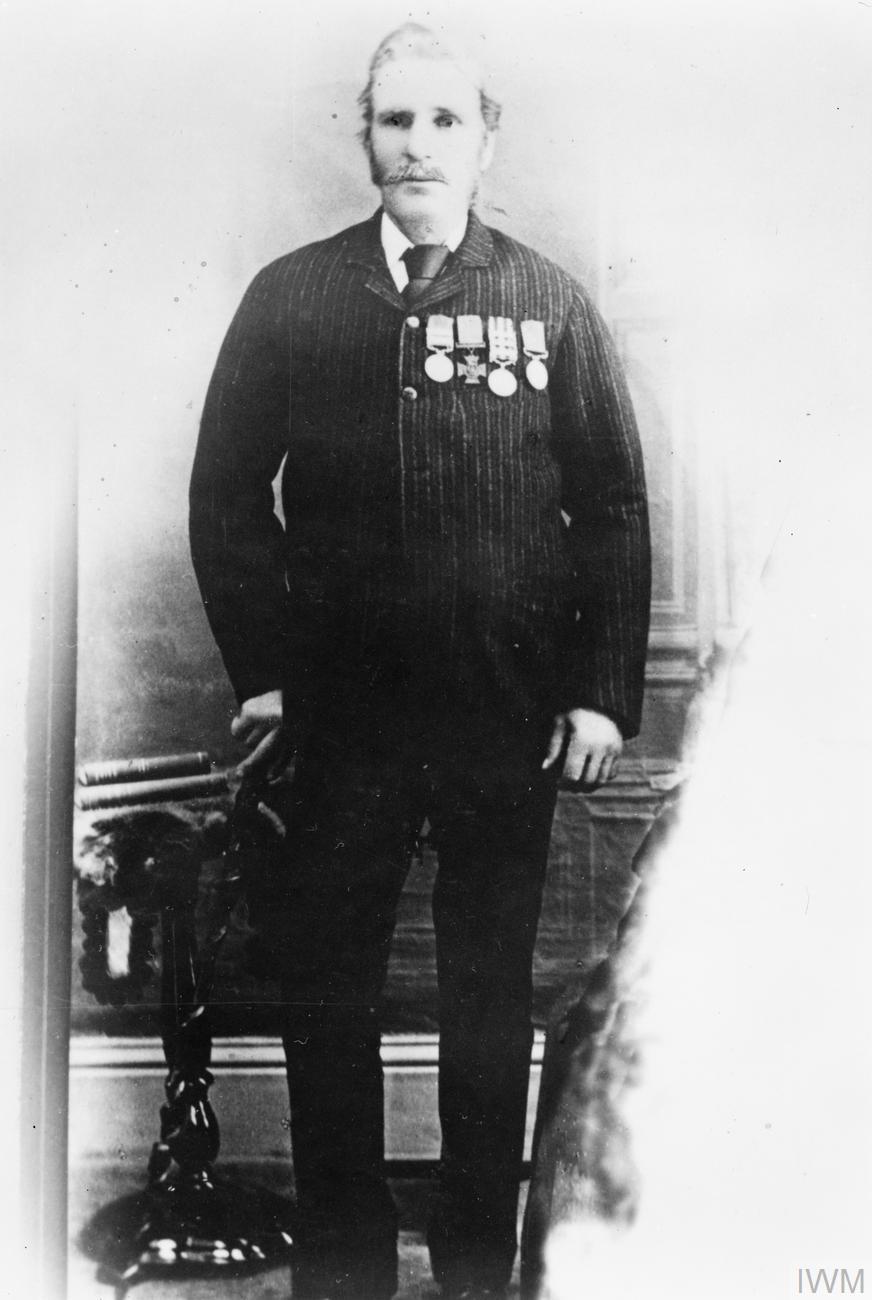
- Born: 26 March 1826; London
- Died: 6 August 1906 (aged 80); South Kensington, London
- Burial place: Brompton Cemetery
- Military career
- Allegiance: United Kingdom
- Branch: Bengal Army; British Indian Army
- Rank: General
- Conflicts: Second Anglo-Sikh War; Indian Mutiny
- Awards: Victoria Cross

General William Martin Cafe VC (26 March 1826 – 6 August 1906) was an English recipient of the Victoria Cross, the highest and most prestigious award for gallantry in the face of the enemy that can be awarded to British and Commonwealth forces.

== Victoria Cross details ==
Cafe was 32 years old, and a captain in the 56th Bengal Native Infantry, Indian Army during the Indian Mutiny when the following deed took place for which he was awarded the VC. On 15 April 1858, during the attack on Fort Ruhya, India, Captain Cafe, with other volunteers (Edward Spence and Alexander Thompson) carried away the body of a lieutenant of the 14th Punjab Rifles from the top of the glacis in a most exposed position under very heavy fire. He then went to the rescue of one of the privates who had been severely wounded. His citation in the London Gazette reads:

For bearing away, under a heavy fire, with the assistance of Privates Thompson, Crowie, Spence, and Cook, the body ol Lieutenant Willoughby, lying near the ditch of the Fort of Ruhya, and for running to the rescue of Private Spence, who had been severely wounded in the attempt.

His Victoria Cross is held by the National Army Museum at Chelsea, London.

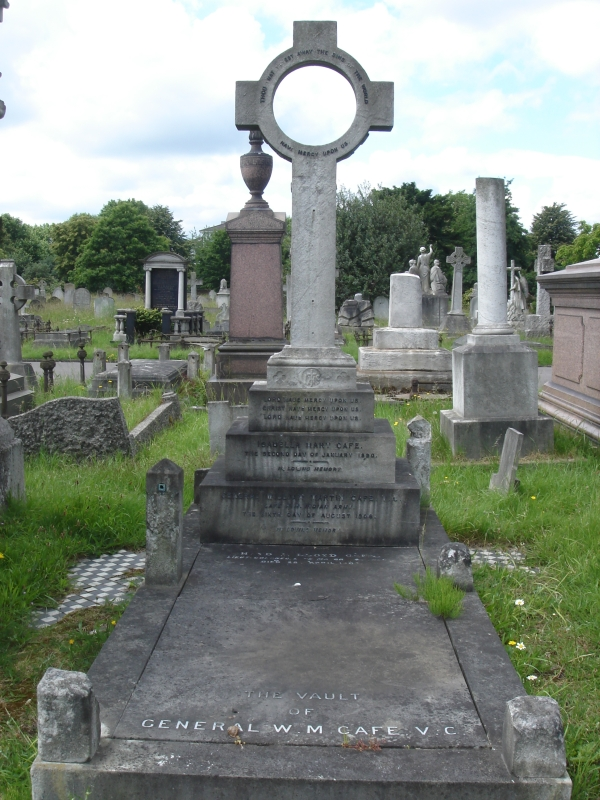
Funerary monument, Brompton Cemetery, London

== Later career ==
He later achieved the rank of General. Cafe is buried in Brompton Cemetery, London, with his wife Isabella Mary.

== Publications ==
- Monuments to Courage (David Harvey, 1999)
- The Register of the Victoria Cross (This England, 1997)
- Scotland's Forgotten Valour (Graham Ross, 1995)
