= Ardmillan =

Suburb of Edinburgh, Scotland

Coordinates: 55°56.28′N 3°13.55′W

Ardmillan: Scottish Gaelic: Aird a' Mhaolain; Scots: Ardmullan
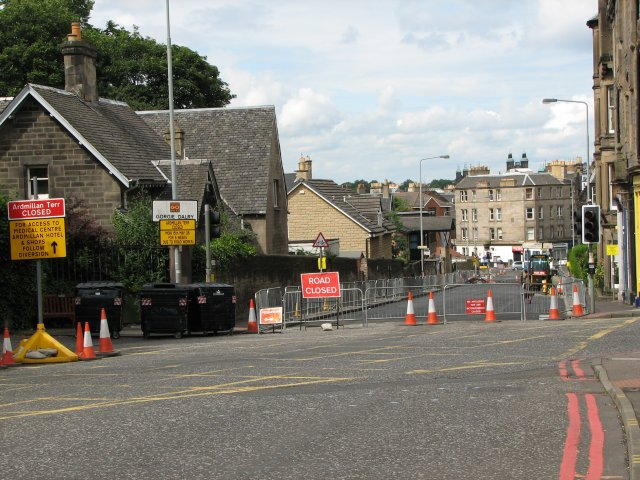
- Ardmillan Terrace

- Location within the City of Edinburgh council area Location within Scotland
- Council area: City of Edinburgh
- Country: Scotland
- Sovereign state: United Kingdom
- Postcode district: EH
- Dialling code: 0131
- Police: Scotland
- Fire: Scottish
- Ambulance: Scottish

Ardmillan (Scottish Gaelic: Aird a' Mhaolain, IPA:[ˈaːɾʲtʲˈaˈvɯːɫ̪ɪn]) is a mainly residential suburb of Edinburgh, Scotland. The area developed during the mid to late Victorian era as Edinburgh expanded and many of the present tenement flats and houses date from this era. The area is bisected by the A70 road and its north-west edge is marked by the Shotts railway line. The area has several pubs, small shops, churches and a cemetery.

== Location ==
The boundary north of Ardmillan is bordered by the area of Dalry. To the west is the area of Gorgie, and to the east is the area of Fountainbridge. Shandon, Polwarth and North Merchiston are to the south of Ardmillan.

== Name ==
The name is from the Court of Session judge, James Craufurd, Lord Ardmillan, who took his name from Ardmillan Castle near Girvan. The name means the "high bare place" in Scottish Gaelic (Aird a' Mhaolain).

== History and architecture ==
The area contains many tenements as well as "Diggers" pub, so called because the gravediggers from the large graveyard in the Ardmillan-Dalry area would go in there after work. Another pub in the area, the Caledonian Sample Room, is often mistakenly assumed to be owned by the nearby Caledonian Brewery (actually it is owned by Punch Taverns).

Ardmillan has two churches. The first is St Michael's Parish Church, which is an ecumenical church. Building of the church began in 1879 and was completed for services in 1883.

There is also an old congregation of Wesleyan Methodists in the area.

Ardmillan is also home to a large, modern health centre called Ardmillan House. The health centre is the location of the South East Scotland Breast Screening Centre.

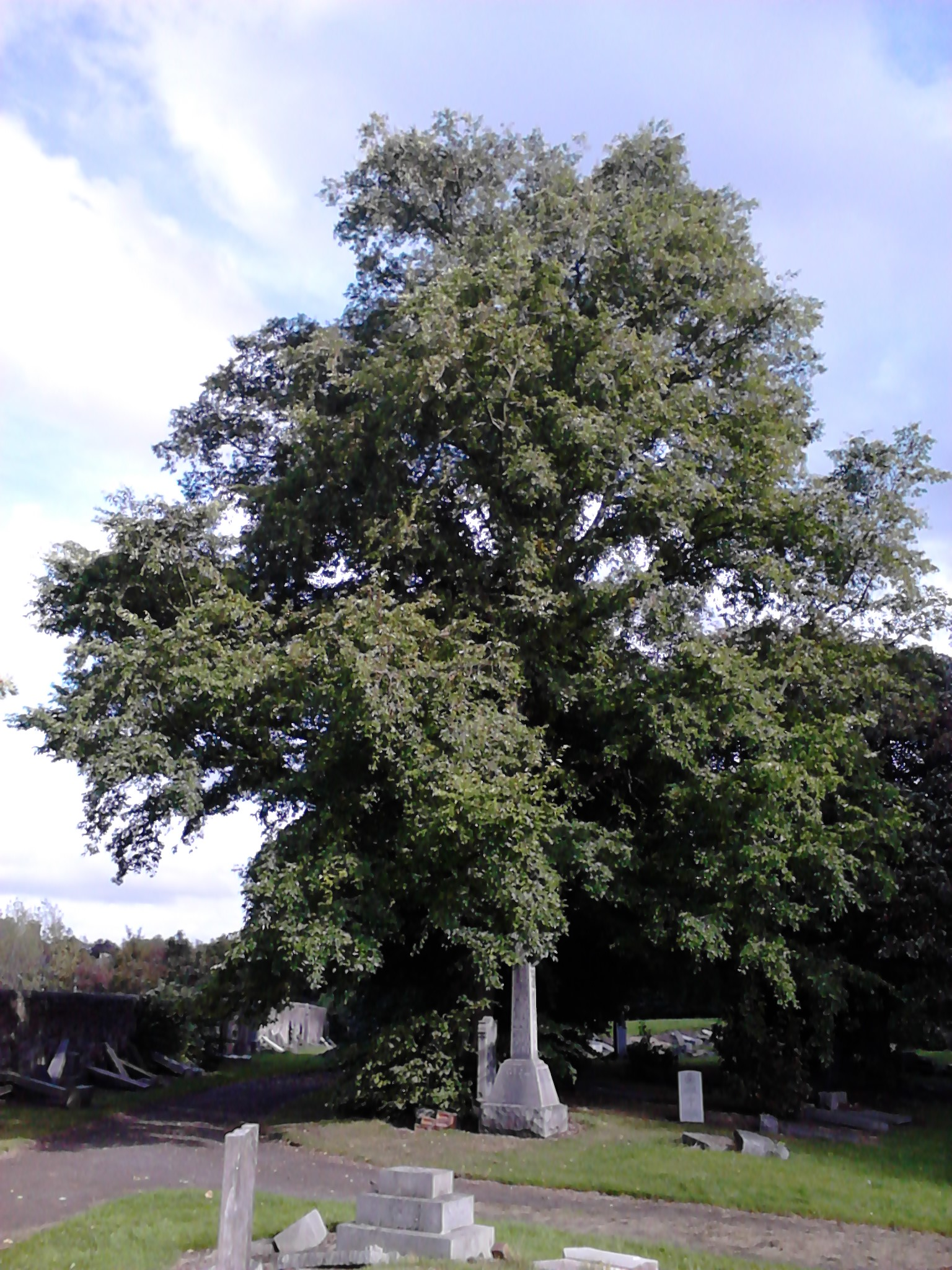
North Merchiston Cemetery in Ardmillan

On the southern boundary with North Merchiston is a large public park - Harrison Park. The origins of the park lie with a public purchase of land by Edinburgh City Council in 1886, with additional land expanding the park being bought in 1930.

== North Merchiston Cemetery ==
North Merchiston Cemetery is a garden cemetery that is located in the western part of Ardmillan, west of Ardmillan Terrace and north of Slateford Road. The cemetery was laid out in 1881 and primarily contains late 19th century and early 20th century burials, including 141 Commonwealth war graves of Armed Forces personnel, over 120 from World War I (some of which are buried in Section K, which has a Screen Wall memorial) and 15 from World War II. Graves include Charles Thomas Kennedy and James Davis, both recipients of the Victoria Cross, and footballers Walter Fairgrieve, Bobby Walker and Alex Walker. The cemetery was under private ownership until the early 1990s when it was acquired by the council due to safety concerns over its neglected state. It was originally built to ease overcrowding at the nearby Dalry cemetery.
