= Walter Lorrain Brodie =

Recipient of the Victoria Cross

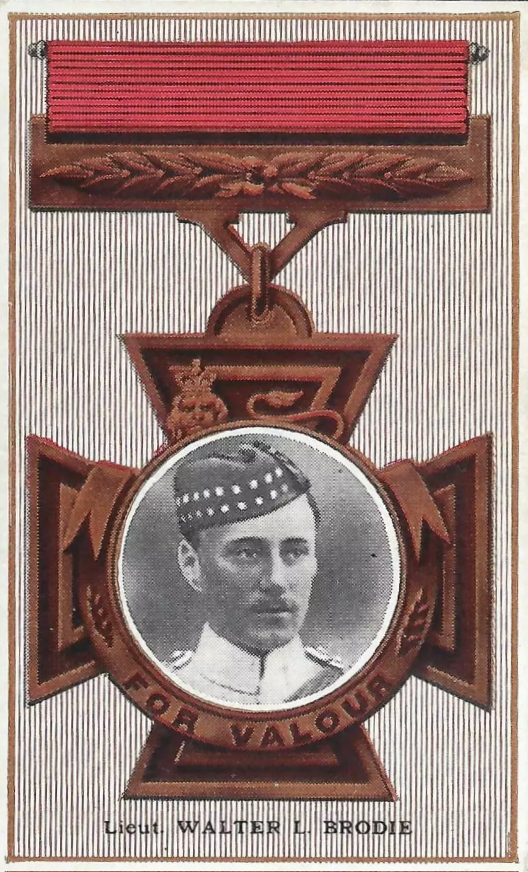
- Brodie on a cigarette card
- Born: 28 July 1884; Edinburgh, Scotland
- Died: 23 August 1918 (aged 34); Behagnies, France
- Burial place: Bienvillers Military Cemetery, France
- Military career
- Allegiance: United Kingdom
- Branch: British Army
- Service years: 1904–1918
- Rank: Lieutenant Colonel
- Units: The Highland Light Infantry
- Conflicts: World War I †
- Awards: Victoria Cross; Military Cross

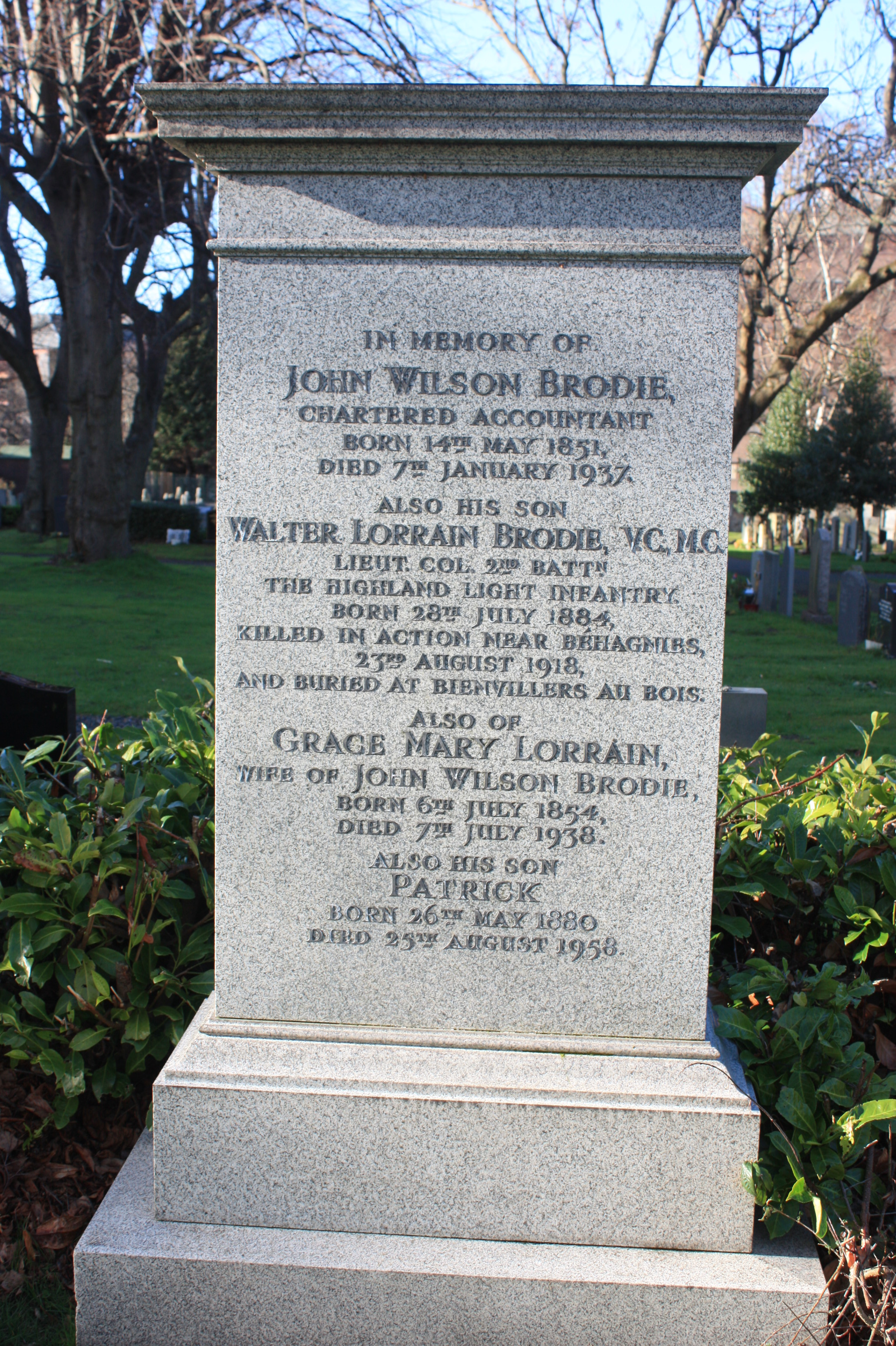
Memorial to Walter Lorrain Brodie, Dean Cemetery, Edinburgh

Lieutenant Colonel Walter Lorrain Brodie VC MC (28 July 1884 – 23 August 1918) was a Scottish recipient of the Victoria Cross, the highest and most prestigious award for gallantry in the face of the enemy that can be awarded to British and Commonwealth forces.

== Life ==
He was born on 28 July 1884 the son of John Wilson Brodie, an Edinburgh chartered accountant, and his wife Grace Mary Lorrain. The family lived at 13 Belgrave Place in Edinburgh's fashionable West End. At the time of Walter's death they had moved to a nearby house at 23 Belgrave Crescent. He was educated at Edinburgh Academy then at the Royal Military College, Sandhurst.

A career soldier, he was commissioned second lieutenant in the Highland Light Infantry in March 1904 and became a lieutenant in 1906. He was an expert in the use of machine-guns.

Brodie was 29 years old, and a lieutenant in the 2nd Battalion, The Highland Light Infantry, British Army during the First World War when the following deed took place on 11 November 1914 near Becelaere, Belgium, for which he was awarded the VC:

For conspicuous gallantry near Becelaere on the 11th November, in clearing the enemy out of a portion of our trenches which they had succeeded in occupying. Heading the charge, he bayonetted several of the enemy, and thereby relieved a dangerous situation. As a result of Lieutenant Brodie's promptitude, 80 of the enemy were killed, and 51 taken prisoners.

Brodie personally killed nine men in the attack. In a letter to his parents the following day he described the event as "a bit of a scrape".

He received the Victoria Cross from King George V at Windsor Castle on 17 July 1915. In January 1917 he was awarded the Military Cross.

He was promoted captain in October 1914 and Brevet Major in January 1918. He later achieved the rank of lieutenant colonel.

Brodie was killed in action near Behagnies, France, on 23 August 1918. He is buried in Bienvillers Military Cemetery in grave XVIII F15.

== Freemasonry ==
He was a Scottish Freemason having been Initiated in Lodge Canongate Kilwinning, No. 2, (Edinburgh) on 7 February, was Passed a Fellow of Craft on 28 February and Raised a Master Mason on 28 March 1906.

== Memorials ==
He is memorialised on his parents' grave in the modern north extension to Dean Cemetery in western Edinburgh. A memorial to Brodie also exists in the New Club on Princes Street of which he was a member. A pavement memorial was installed at Brodie's home in Belgrave Place, Edinburgh, around 2020.

Brodie's medals are on loan to the National War Museum of Scotland, Edinburgh.
