= Stanley Boughey =

Recipient of the Victoria Cross

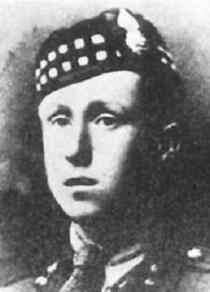
- Born: 9 April 1896; Toxteth Park, Liverpool
- Died: 4 December 1917 (aged 21); El Burj, Palestine
- Burial place: Gaza War Cemetery
- Military career
- Allegiance: United Kingdom
- Branch: British Army
- Service years: 1914–1917
- Rank: Second Lieutenant
- Units: Red Cross; Ayrshire Yeomanry; Royal Scots Fusiliers
- Conflicts: World War I
- Awards: Victoria Cross

Second Lieutenant Stanley Henry Parry Boughey VC (9 April 1896 – 4 December 1917) was a British Army officer and a British recipient of the Victoria Cross (VC), the highest and most prestigious award for gallantry in the face of the enemy that can be awarded to British and Commonwealth forces.

Boughey was born in Liverpool on 9 April 1896 and was brought up in Blackpool. He was 21 years old, and a second lieutenant in the 1/4th Battalion, The Royal Scots Fusiliers, British Army during the First World War. He was awarded the VC for his actions on 1 December 1917 in The Battle of El Burj against the Ottoman Army in Palestine. He was wounded committing the act, and died three days later, on 4 December.

== Citation ==
For most conspicuous bravery. When the enemy in large numbers had managed to crawl up to within 30 yards of our firing line, and with bombs and automatic rifles were keeping down the fire of our machine guns, he rushed forward alone with bombs right up to the enemy, doing great execution and causing the surrender of a party of 30. As he turned to go back for more bombs he was mortally wounded at the moment when the enemy were surrendering.

— London Gazette, 12 February 1918

Boughey was interred at the Gaza War Cemetery.

== See also ==
- List of Scottish Victoria Cross recipients
