= 42nd Regiment of Foot =

Scottish regiment in the British Army

42nd (Royal Highland) Regiment of Foot
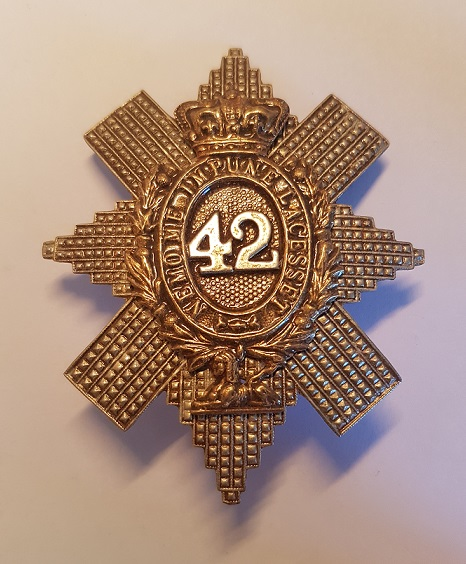
- Cap badge of the 42nd Regiment of Foot
- Active: 1739–1881
- Country: Kingdom of Great Britain (1739–1800); United Kingdom (1801–1881)
- Branch: British Army
- Type: Line Infantry
- Garrison/HQ: Queen's Barracks, Perth
- Nicknames: Black Watch; Forty-Twa; Black Jocks
- Motto: (Scotland's) Nemo me impune lacessit
- Engagements: War of the Austrian Succession; French and Indian War; American War of Independence; Peninsular War; Indian Mutiny; Anglo-Ashanti Wars
- Battle honours: Egypt 1801; Corunna; Peninsula; Waterloo; Alma, Sevastopol; Lucknow; Ashanti

The 42nd (Royal Highland) Regiment of Foot was a Scottish infantry regiment in the British Army also known as the Black Watch. Originally titled Crawford's Highlanders or the Highland Regiment (mustered 1739) and numbered 43rd in the line, in 1748, on the disbanding of James Oglethorpe's Regiment of Foot they were renumbered 42nd, and in 1751 formally titled the 42nd (Highland) Regiment of Foot. The 42nd Regiment was one of the first three Highland Regiments to fight in North America, along with the 77th and 78th Regiments. The unit was honoured with the name Royal Highland Regiment in 1758. Its informal name Black Watch became official in 1861. In 1881, the regiment was amalgamated with 73rd (Perthshire) Regiment of Foot under the Childers Reforms into The Royal Highland Regiment (The Black Watch), being officially redesignated The Black Watch (Royal Highland Regiment) in 1931. In 2006, the Black Watch became part of the Royal Regiment of Scotland.

== History ==
=== Early history ===
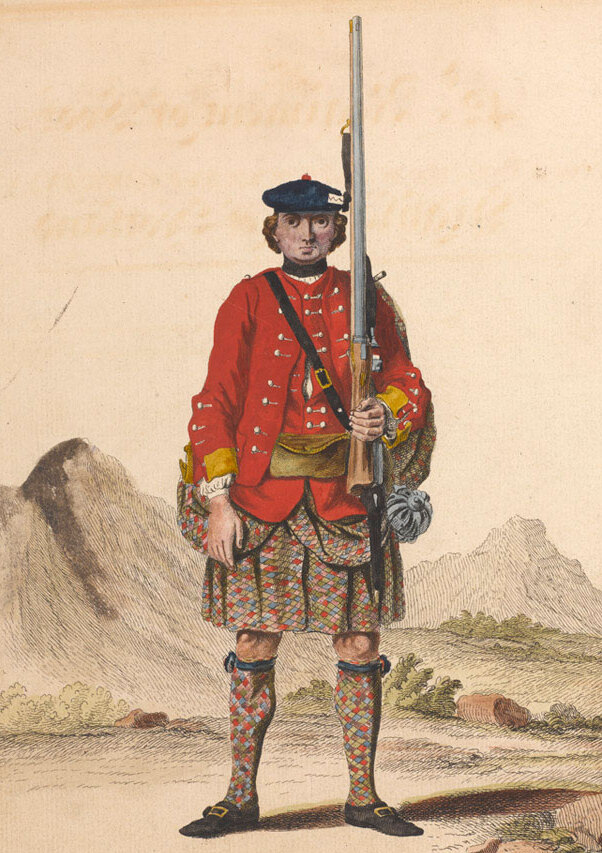
c. 1742 engraving of a regimental private

Following the Jacobite rising of 1715 the British government did not have the resources or manpower to keep a standing army in the Scottish Highlands. As a result, they were forced to keep order by recruiting men from local Highland clans that had been loyal to the Whigs. This proved to be unsuccessful in deterring crime, especially cattle rustling. Therefore, Independent Highland Companies (of what would be known as the "Black Watch") were raised as a militia in 1725 by General George Wade to keep "watch" for crime. He was commissioned to build a network of roads to help in the task. The six Independent Highland Companies were recruited from local clans, with one company coming from Clan Munro, one from Clan Fraser of Lovat, one from Clan Grant and three from Clan Campbell. These companies were commonly known as Am Freiceadan Dubh, or the Black Watch, this name may well have been due to the way they dressed. Four more companies were added in 1739 to make a total of ten Independent Highland Companies.

The ten Independent Highland Companies of "Black Watch" were officially formed into the "43rd Highland Regiment of Foot", a regiment of the line in 1739. It was first mustered in 1740, at Aberfeldy, Scotland. The Colonel was John Lindsay, 20th Earl of Crawford and the Lieutenant-Colonel was Sir Robert Munro, 6th Baronet. Among the Captains were his next brother, George Munro, 1st of Culcairn (also a Captain of an Independent Company raised in 1745) and their cousin John Munro, 4th of Newmore, who was promoted Lieutenant-Colonel in 1745 (in place of Sir Robert who went on to command the 37th (North Hampshire) Regiment of Foot). The other Captains of the 43rd were George Grant, Colin Campbell of Monzie, James Colquhoun of Luss, John Campbell of Carrick, Collin Campbell of Balliemore and Dougal Campbell of Craignish.

=== First action and mutiny ===
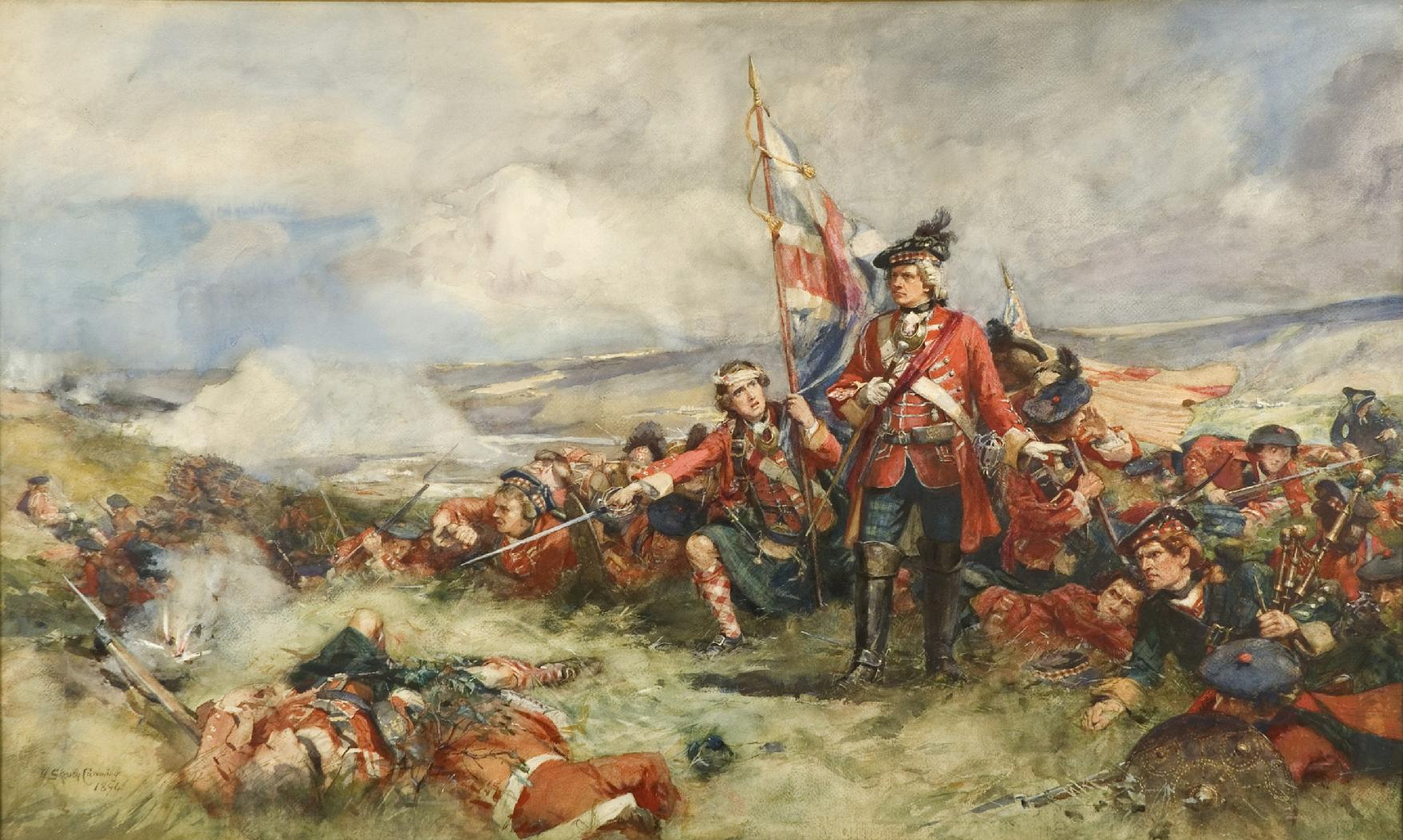
The regiment at the Battle of Fontenoy

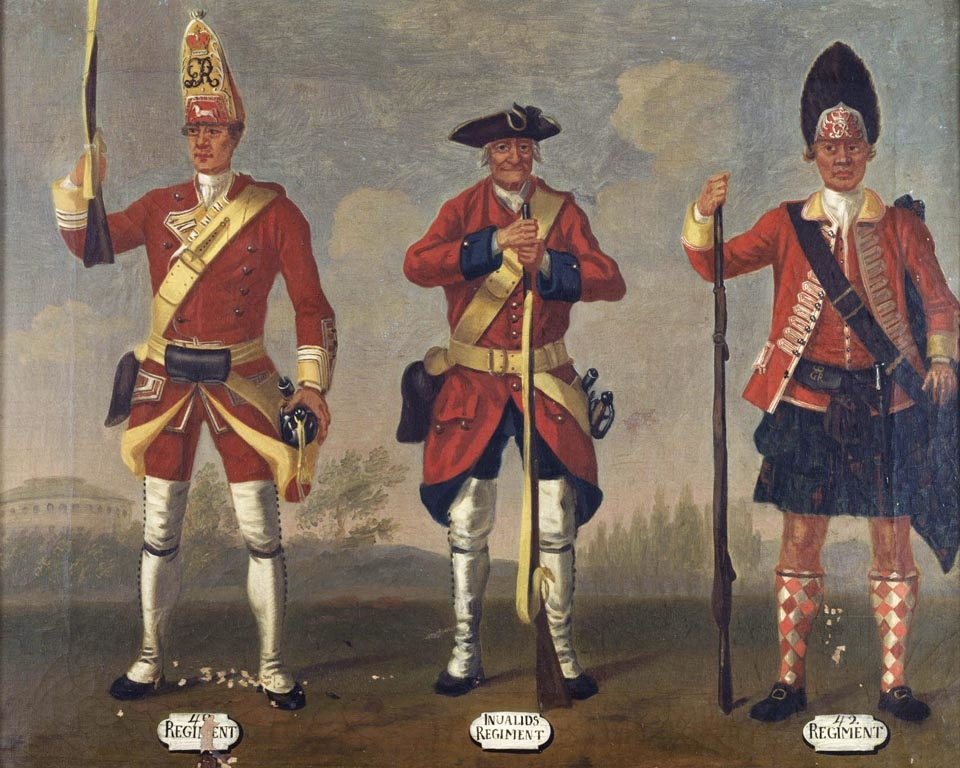
c. 1751 painting of a regimental private (right)

In March 1743, the regiment was assembled at Perth in preparation for moving to London, then Flanders to join British forces fighting in the War of the Austrian Succession. Scottish officials, including the Lord President of the Court of Session, Duncan Forbes warned the government this was contrary to a general understanding their service was restricted to Scotland. Forbes also foresaw that if the regiment was withdrawn from its watching brief in the Highlands the French might, in conjunction with Jacobites, take the opportunity to sponsor an insurrection in the Highlands as a diversionary tactic in the war. Assured the move was only because George II wanted to inspect them, they arrived in London in May and were then ordered to Gravesend for shipment to Flanders. Anger at the deception, allied to rumours they were going to the West Indies, a location notorious for high mortality rates, caused a mutiny; they set out for Scotland, led by Corporals Malcolm and Samuel MacPherson and Private Farquhar Shaw. They reached Ladywood on the outskirts of Oundle, Northamptonshire on 22 May before being intercepted. The mutineers surrendered in hope of a free pardon but were marched back to London and incarcerated in the Tower of London. The three leaders of the mutiny were subsequently court-martialed and executed by firing squad on 18 July 1743, at Tower Green. Two hundred other members of the regiment were distributed variously to garrisons in Jamaica, Gibraltar and Menorca, with the remainder shipped to Flanders.

The regiment's first full combat was the disastrous Battle of Fontenoy in May 1745, where they surprised the French with their ferocity, and greatly impressed their commander, the Duke of Cumberland. Allowed "their own way of fighting", each time they received the French fire Colonel Sir Robert Munro ordered his men to "clap to the ground" while he himself, because of his corpulence, stood alone with the colours behind him.

When the Jacobite rising of 1745 broke out, another three companies were raised in Scotland, one being present at the Battle of Prestonpans in September 1745 where the entire company was either killed or taken prisoner. Another fought for the government under Dugald Campbell of Auchrossan at the Battle of Culloden in April 1746 where they suffered no casualties. These three companies were disbanded in 1748. The rest of the regiment landed in England on 4 November and remained there in anticipation of a possible French invasion until after the rebellion ended. From early 1747 to the end of 1748, it was in Flanders but otherwise was stationed in Ireland until 1756. In 1749, after James Oglethorpe's Regiment of Foot was disbanded and the Black Watch was re-numbered the 42nd and in 1751 formally titled the 42nd (Highland) Regiment of Foot. On the outbreak of the Seven Years' War in 1756, it was sent to North America.

=== The Americas ===
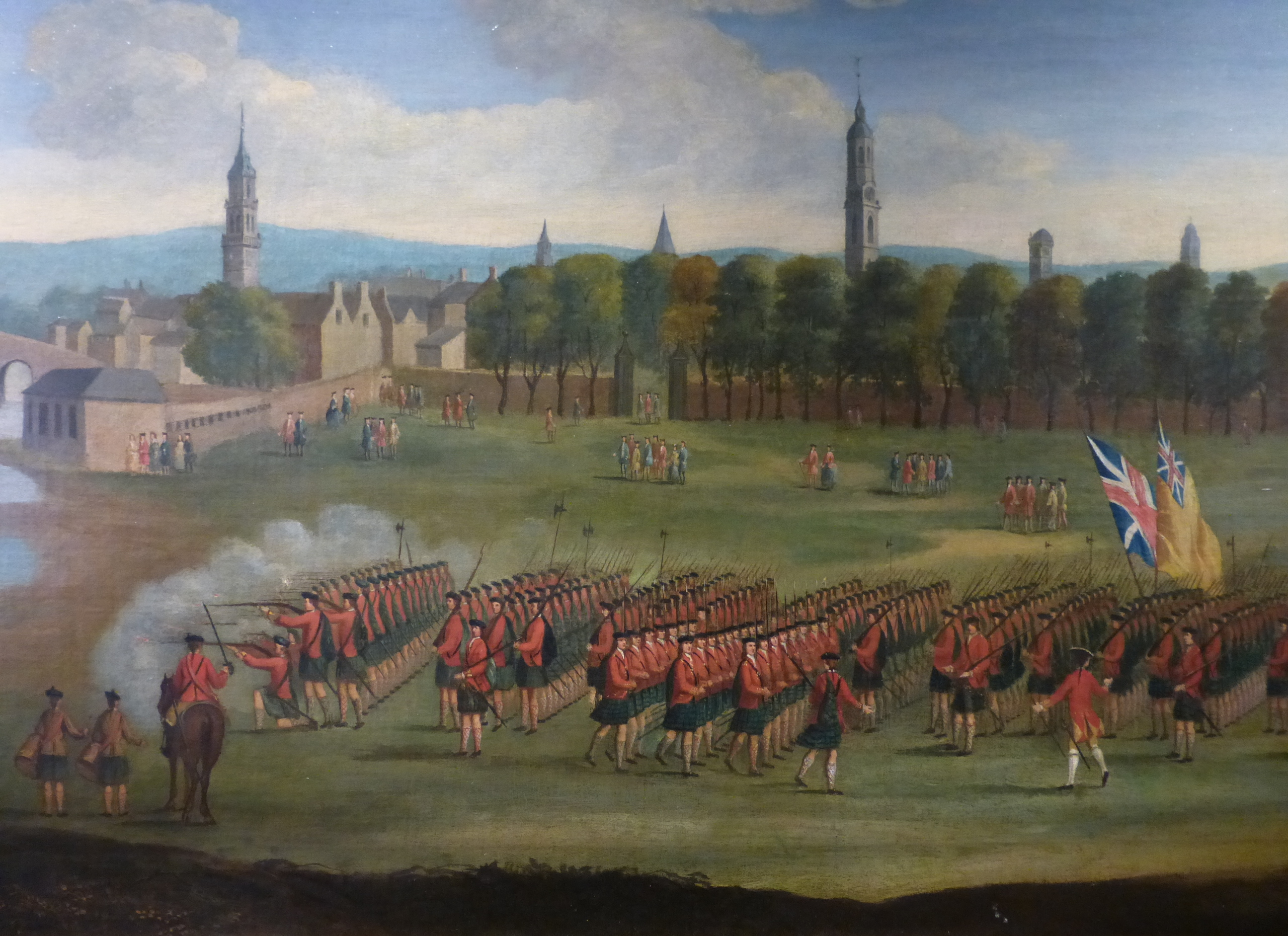
c. 1758 painting of the regiment being reviewed on the Glasgow Green

Between 1758 and 1767 the 42nd served in America. During the French and Indian War, at the first battle of Ticonderoga, also known as the Battle of Carillon, the regiment lost over half of its men in the assault in July 1758. At that time they were already officially recognized as a Royal regiment. The second battalion of the Black Watch was sent to the Caribbean but after the losses of Ticonderoga, the two battalions were consolidated in New York. The regiment was present at the second battle of Ticonderoga in July 1759 and the surrender of Montreal in September 1760. They were sent to the West Indies again where they saw action at Havana, Martinique and Guadeloupe.

In August 1763, the regiment fought in the Battle of Bushy Run while trying to relieve Fort Pitt, modern Pittsburgh, during Pontiac's Rebellion.

In 1765, the regiment was stationed at Fort Loudoun in Pennsylvania, where rising tensions between themselves and local settlers culminated in an armed conflict known as The Black Boys rebellion. Confrontations between soldiers and settlers became common, and Lieutenant John Grant was taken captive in retaliation for the confiscation of firearms from several homes. Grant was eventually released on the condition the rifles were to be returned within six weeks, but they never were. In November, Pennsylvania governor John Penn ordered the regiment to transfer from Fort Loudoun to their winter quarters at Fort Bedford, 40 miles (64 km) to the west. Before their departure, a 300-man force of colonists led by James Smith laid siege to the fort. Smith's men fired on the enclosure, while the 42nd, low on powder and ammunition, only fired once. Grant finally capitulated after two days, returning the guns, and Smith's men allowed the garrison to depart for Bedford. The regiment next went to Cork, Ireland in 1767 and returned to Scotland in 1775.

During the American Revolutionary War, the regiment was involved in the defeat of George Washington in the Battle of Long Island in August 1776 and saw combat at the Battle of Harlem Heights in September 1776, the Battle of Fort Washington in November 1776 and the Battle of Piscataway in February 1777. It also fought at the Battle of Brandywine (light infantry and grenadier companies only) in September 1777, the Battle of Germantown (Light Company only) in October 1777 and the Battle of Monmouth in June 1778 as well as the siege of Charleston in spring 1780. In September 1778 a detachment from the regiment raided Fairhaven, Massachusetts, inflicting severe damage on the town's shipping industry.

A 2nd Battalion was formed in March 1780, with eight officers from the 1st Battalion being detached to help raise the new battalion. The 2nd battalion was sent to India in January 1781 and took part in the siege of Mangalore in autumn 1783 during the Second Anglo-Mysore War. It was still in India when it was redesignated in 1786 as the 73rd (Highland) Regiment of Foot.

Following the end of the war in America, the 1st Battalion were posted to Nova Scotia in 1783, serving there until 1786 when they moved north to Cape Breton Island. The regiment returned to England in 1789. Landing at Portsmouth, they marched to Tynemouth in Northumberland and in the spring of 1790 marched on to Glasgow, before taking up residence at Edinburgh Castle in November 1790.

=== French Revolutionary Wars ===
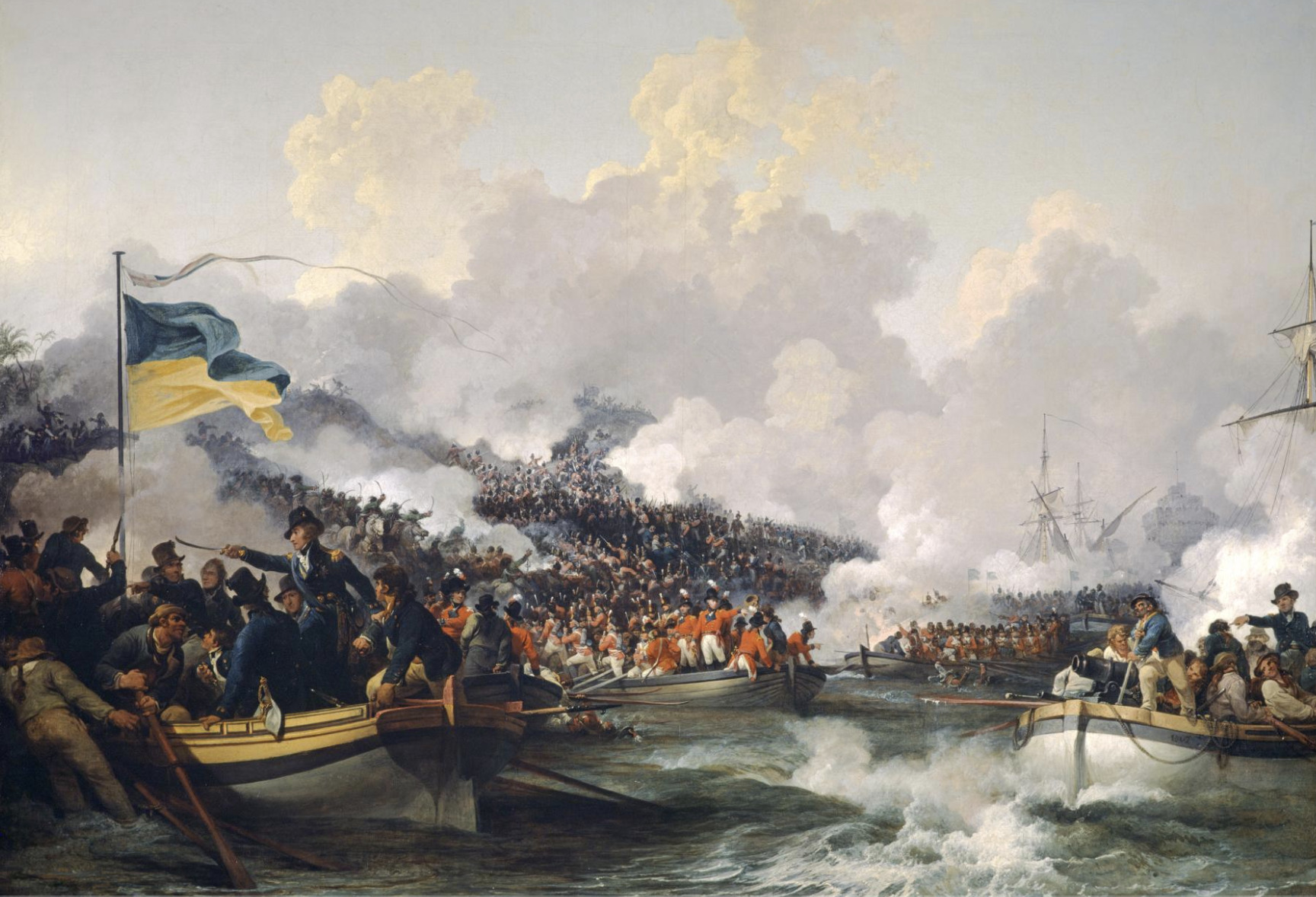
The Battle of Abukir, which the regiment fought in

On 8 March 1801, The 42nd took part in the British victory at the Battle of Abukir. At 9 am the troops beached their craft under a rainstorm of a French cannonade and musket fire from 2,500 French troops positioned on the high dunes. The British troops disembarked, formed a line, fixed bayonets and advanced, undaunted by French fire. With General Moore leading the landing force, the 42nd, located in the landing force's centre, struggled up the steep soft sandy ground. The French appeared at the summit and poured a destructive musket volley at the advancing soldiers. The lead troops of the 42nd reached the summit before the French could reload and launched a bayonet charge, hurling them back in confusion. The French counter attacked with a squadron of cavalry before a second bayonet charge by the 42nd caused them to flee. The British losses were 102 all ranks killed and 515 wounded; of these the 42nd Highlanders had 31 killed. The commanding officer, Lt Colonel James Stewart, 6 officers, 7 sergeants, 4 Drummers, and 140 rank and file were wounded. James Stewart had been wounded along with a few soldiers as the boats came into shore. The leadership by the company commanders and subsequent success against an enemy force of double the British numbers was noteworthy.

The Battle of Aboukir allowed a bridgehead to be created as a prelude to the Battle of Alexandria thirteen days later on the 21st March 1801. The 42nd was commanded by Lt Colonel Alexander Stewart after the wounding of Lt Col James Stewart at Aboukir. During the Battle Major Stirling captured a standard from the French which he handed to Sergeant Sinclair who was later wounded and subsequently the standard was lost. They went on to besiege Cairo and then Alexandria in which the French forces were expelled from Egypt.

=== Peninsular War ===
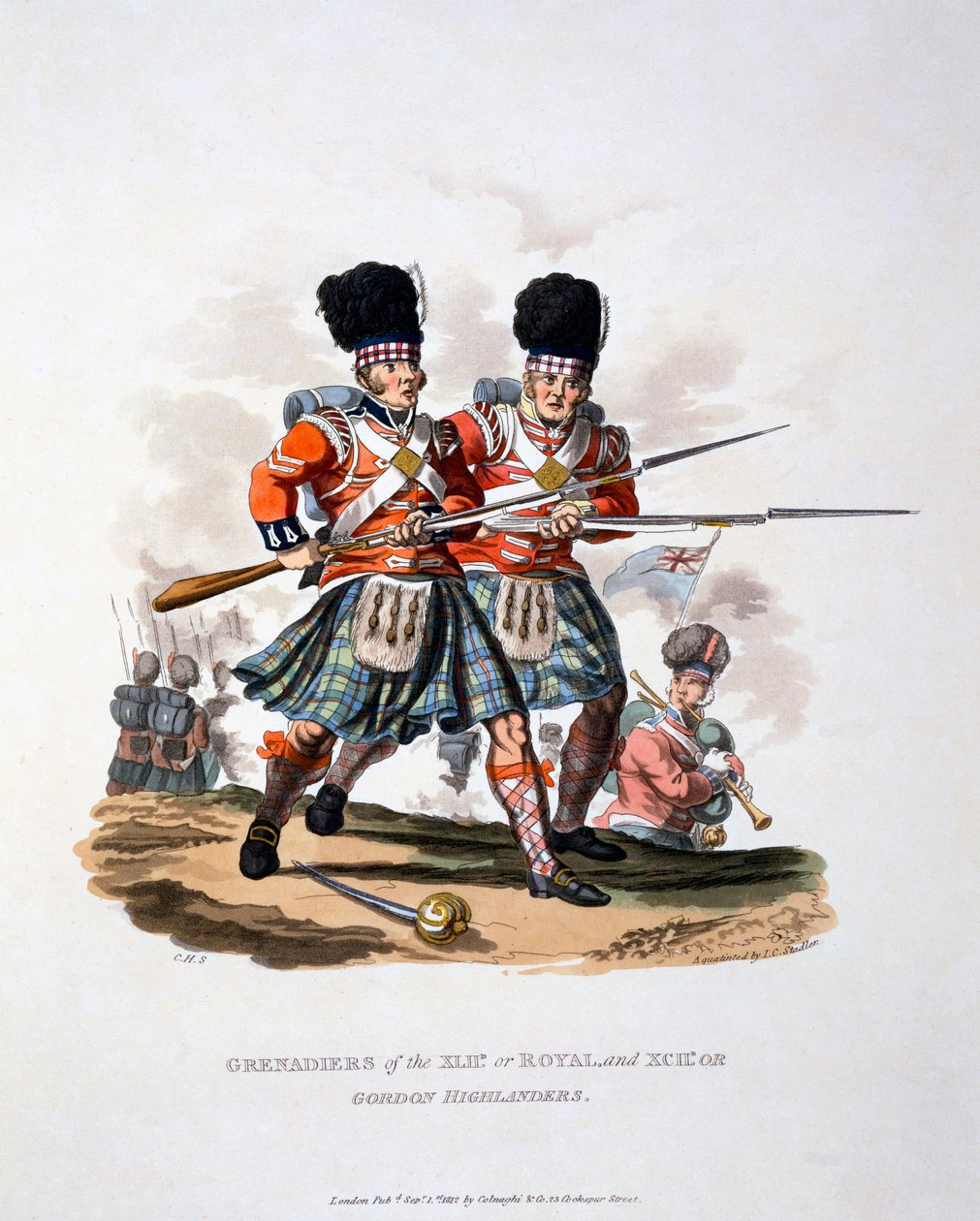
1812 engraving of a regimental grenadier (left)

The 1st battalion embarked for Portugal in August 1808 for service in the Peninsular War. At the Battle of Corunna in January 1809 it was a soldier of the 42nd Highlanders who carried the mortally wounded General Sir John Moore to cover, and six more who carried him to the rear, but only after he had witnessed the victory in which the stout defence of the Black Watch played a major part. Moore's army was evacuated from Spain and the 1st Battalion of the 42nd Highlanders went with them.

As the 1st battalion left, the 2nd battalion was dispatched from Ireland to Spain for service in the Peninsular War. The 2nd battalion fought at the Battle of Bussaco in September 1810 before falling back to the Lines of Torres Vedras. The 2nd battalion fought with great distinction at the Battle of Fuentes de Oñoro in May 1811, the siege of Ciudad Rodrigo in January 1812 and the bloody siege of Badajoz in March 1812 before returning home to recruit. The 1st battalion returned to the Peninsula in time to fight in the Battle of Salamanca in July 1812, the siege of Burgos in September 1812 and the Battle of Vitoria in June 1813. It then pursued the French Army into France and fought at the Battle of the Pyrenees in July 1813, the Battle of Nivelle in November 1813 and the Battle of the Nive in December 1813 before seeing action at the Battle of Orthez in February 1814 and the Battle of Toulouse in April 1814.

=== Waterloo ===
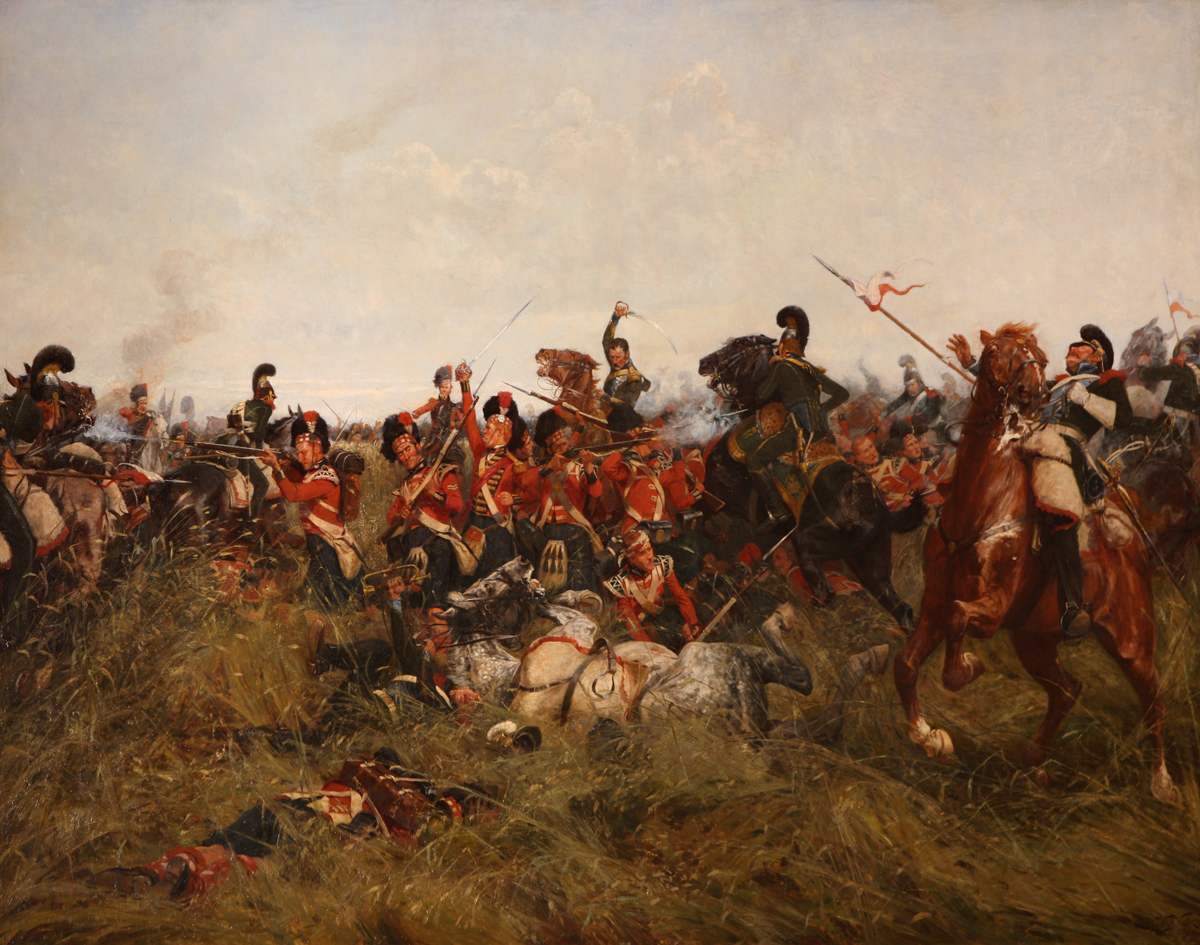
The regiment at the Battle of Quatre Bras

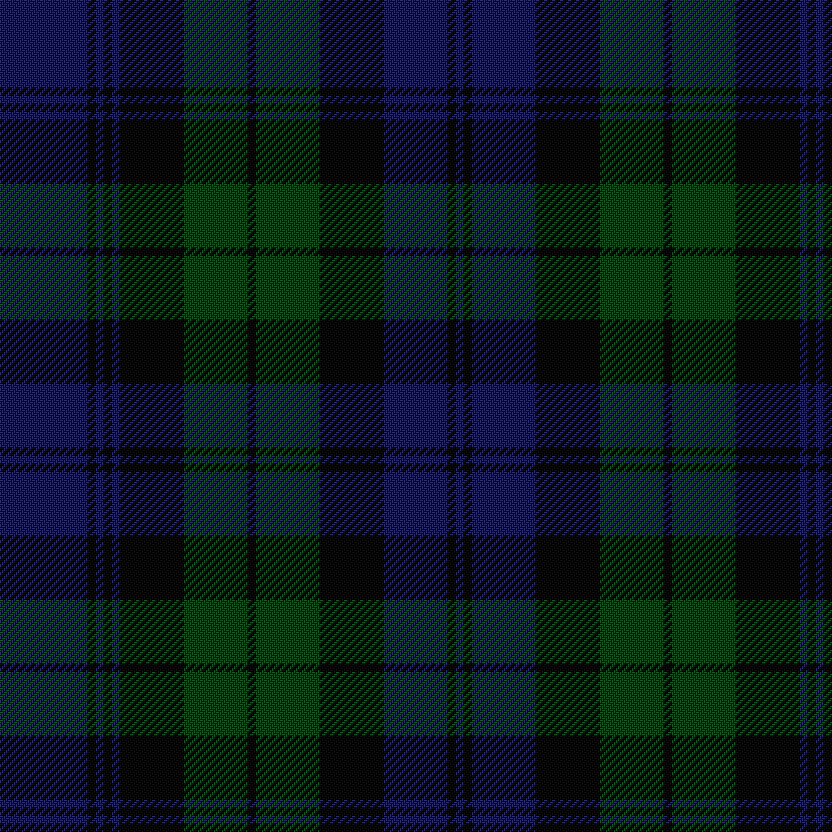
The regimental tartan

With the war with France now apparently over, the 2nd battalion was disbanded in 1814 and some of its number transferred to the permanent 1st battalion. The now single battalion 42nd fought at the chaotic Battle of Quatre Bras on 16 June 1815 under Lieutenant-colonel Sir Robert Macara, who was killed by French lancers. The 42nd was one of four battalions mentioned by Wellington in dispatches after the battle. Two days later at the Battle of Waterloo, the 42nd and also the 2nd/73rd Highlanders, which was later to become the new 2nd Battalion, Black Watch, were both in some of the most intense fighting in the battle.

=== The Victorian era ===
From 1847 to 1851 the regiment was posted to the garrison of the Imperial fortress of Bermuda, in British North America (Bermuda's garrison forming part of the Nova Scotia command until after the 1867 Confederation of Canada), arriving from Malta aboard HMS Vengeance (which had departed Malta on the 21 or 27, depending on the source) February with the 1st Battalion under Lieutenant-Colonel D. A. Cameron) and HMS Resistance (the arrival of which at Malta had been delayed, resulting in its departing with the 2nd Battalion at a later date).

The 1st Battalion arrived in Bermuda on 15 April 1847. The Vengeance and Deliverance then delivered the 20th (East Devonshire) Regiment of Foot from Bermuda to Halifax, Nova Scotia. The 2nd Battalion (or Reserve Battalion) under Lieutenant-Colonel MacDougall departed Malta aboard the Deliverance on the 16 March 1847, and arrived at Bermuda on 24 of April, after stopping at Gibraltar for water.

The 42nd Regiment was stationed in Bermuda at a time when the military infrastructure, as well as the naval, was undergoing development and expansion. The regiment provided working parties to clear ground in Devonshire Parish for the development of what was to become Prospect Camp and to dig a well near to the Government House on Mount Langton in Pembroke Parish during a drought in 1849. The well has been known since as Black Watch Well. In the 1930s, a pass was cut through the ridgeline from Black Watch Well, on the North Shore Road, to Marsh Folly Road, and it took its name, Black Watch Pass, from the adjacent well.

The regiment formed part of the Highland Brigade at the Battle of Alma in September 1854 and the siege of Sevastapol in winter 1854 during the Crimean War; it also formed part of that brigade at the siege of Cawnpore in June 1857 and the siege of Lucknow in autumn 1857 during the Indian Rebellion. During the siege of Cawnpore the regiment captured a gong which has tolled the hours in the regiment's guardroom ever since.

As part of the Cardwell Reforms of the 1870s, where single-battalion regiments were linked together to share a single depot and recruiting district in the United Kingdom, the 40th was linked with the 79th Regiment of Foot (Cameronian Volunteers), and assigned to district no. 57 at Queen's Barracks in Perth. On 1 July 1881 the Childers Reforms came into effect and the regiment amalgamated with the 73rd (Perthshire) Regiment of Foot to form the Black Watch (Royal Highlanders).

== Popular culture ==
A number of songs were composed about the regiment including and "Jock MacGraw" and "The Gallant Forty Twa".

The second line of Brian McNeill's song "The Baltic tae Byzantium" briefly references the 42nd as "The Gallant Forty Twa".

The traditional Scots Language song "Twa Recruitin' Sergeants" refers to efforts by recruiters to lure Highlanders to the regiment.

Gregory Burke's 2006 play Black Watch for the National Theatre of Scotland, based on interviews with soldiers and featuring as a recurring motif the songs The Gallant Forty Twa and Twa Recruitin' Sergeants, is a dramatised account of the regiment's part in Operation Telic.

== Notable soldiers ==
- James Abercrombie
- Duncan Cameron
- John Small
- John Grant

== Battle honours ==
Battle honours awarded to the regiment were:

- Egypt
- Peninsular War: Corunna, Fuentes D'Onor, Pyrenees, Nivelle, Nive, Orthes, Toulouse, Peninsula
- Waterloo
- Crimean War: Alma, Sevastopol
- Indian Mutiny: Lucknow
- Ashanti Wars: Ashantee 1873-74
- Guadaloupe 1759, Martinique 1762, Havannah (awarded to successor regiment, 1909)
- Busaco, (awarded to successor regiment, 1910)
- North America 1763-64, (awarded to successor regiment, 1914)
- Salamanca, (awarded to successor regiment, 1951)

== Victoria Crosses ==
- Private Walter Cook, Indian Mutiny (15 January 1859)
- Private James Davis, Indian Mutiny (15 April 1858)
- Lieutenant Francis Farquharson, Indian Mutiny (9 March 1858)
- Colour Sergeant William Gardner, Indian Mutiny (5 May 1858)
- Lance-Sergeant Samuel McGaw, First Ashanti Expedition (21 January 1874)
- Private Duncan Millar, Indian Mutiny (15 January 1859)
- Quartermaster Sergeant John Simpson, Indian Mutiny (15 April 1858)
- Private Edward Spence, Indian Mutiny (15 April 1858)
- Lance Corporal Alexander Thompson, Indian Mutiny (5 April 1858)

== Regimental Colonels ==
Colonels of the Regiment were:

- 1739–1741: Lt-Gen. John Lindsay, 20th Earl of Crawford
- 1741–1745: Brig-Gen. Hugh Sempill, 12th Lord Sempill
- 1745–1787: Gen. Lord John Murray

42nd (Royal Highland) Regiment of Foot - (1758)

- 1787–1805: Gen. Sir Hector Munro, KB
- 1806–1820: Gen. George Gordon, 5th Duke of Gordon, GCB (Marquess of Huntly)
- 1820–1823: Gen. John Hope, 4th Earl of Hopetoun, GCB
- 1823–1844: Gen. Sir George Murray, GCB, GCH
- 1844–1850: Lt-Gen. Sir John Macdonald, GCB
- 1850–1862: Gen. Sir James Dawes Douglas, GCB
- 1862–1863: F.M. George Hay, 8th Marquess of Tweeddale, KT, GCB

42nd (Royal Highland) Regiment of Foot, The Black Watch - (1861)

- 1863–1881: Gen. Sir Duncan Alexander Cameron, GCB

== Bibliography ==
- Cannon, Richard (1845). Historical Record of the Forty-second, or, the Royal Highland Regiment of Foot. London: Parker, Furnivall, and Parker. OCLC 1083481660.
- Cannon, Richard (1851). Historical record of the Seventy-Third Regiment containing an account of the formation of the regiment from the period of its being raised as the second battalion of the 42nd Royal Highlanders in 1780 and of its subsequent services to 1851. CIHM/ICMH Microfiche. Parker, Furnivall and Parker. OCLC 1083488364.
- Groves, Percy (2017) [1893]. History Of The 42nd Royal Highlanders: The Black Watch, Now The First Battalion The Black Watch (Royal Highlanders) 1729-1893. Edinburgh: W. & A. K. Johnston. ISBN 978-1-376-26948-2.
- Pollard, Tony, ed. (2009). Culloden: The History and Archaeology of the Last Clan Battle. Barnsley, England: Pen & Sword Military. ISBN 978-1-84884-020-1.
- Schofield, Victoria (2012). The Highland Furies: The Black Watch 1739–1899. London: Quercus. ISBN 978-1-84916-918-9.
- Simpson, Peter (1996). The Independent Highland Companies, 1603–1760. Edinburgh: J. Donald. ISBN 978-0-85976-432-2.
- Stewart, David (1822). Sketches of the Character, Manners, and Present State of the Highlanders.
- Swinson, Arthur (1972). A Register of the Regiments and Corps of the British Army. London: The Archive Press. ISBN 0-85591-000-3.
