= Alexander Thompson (VC) =

Scottish recipient of the Victoria Cross

- Born: c. 1824; Edinburgh, Scotland
- Died: 29 March 1880 (aged 55-56); Perth, Scotland
- Burial place: Wellshill Cemetery, Perth
- Military career
- Allegiance: United Kingdom
- Branch: British Army
- Rank: Sergeant
- Units: 42nd Regiment of Foot
- Conflicts: Crimean War; Indian Mutiny
- Awards: Victoria Cross

Alexander Thompson VC (c. 1824 – 29 March 1880) was a Scottish recipient of the Victoria Cross, the highest and most prestigious award for gallantry in the face of the enemy that can be awarded to British and Commonwealth forces.

== Details ==
Thompson was about 34 years old, and a lance-corporal in the 42nd Regiment of Foot (later The Black Watch (Royal Highlanders)), British Army during the Indian Mutiny when the following deed took place for which he was awarded the VC. On 15 April 1858 during the attack on Fort Ruhya, British India, Lance-Corporal Thompson volunteered, with others, including Edward Spence, to assist Captain William Martin Cafe in carrying in the body of a lieutenant from the top of the glacis, in an exposed position under heavy fire. His citation read:

For daring gallantry, on the 15th April, 1858, when at the attack of the Fort of Ruhya, in having volunteered to assist Captain Groves, Commanding the 4th Punjab Rifles, in bringing in the body of Lieutenant Willoughby, of that Corps, from the top of the Glacis, in a most exposed situation, under a heavy fire.

== Further information ==
Alexander joined the 42nd Regiment (later renamed the Black Watch) in 1842. He served in Malta, Bermuda and later the Crimea where he fought at the battles of Alma, Sevastepol and Balaclava. Following his service in India during the Indian Mutiny he was promoted to the rank of Sergeant. He retired from the army in 1862 and spent his remaining years in Perth until his death in 1880. He was survived by his wife Isabella and 4 children. He is buried in Wellshill Cemetery in north Perth. Alexander's eldest son, George became a Church of Scotland minister in the parish of Carnbee Fife.

== The medal ==
His Victoria Cross is displayed at the Black Watch Museum, Perth, Scotland. Also displayed are his campaign medals – Crimea with Alma, Sebastopol and Balaclava clasps; Turkish medal, and Indian Mutiny with Lucknow clasp.
