= James Craufurd, Lord Ardmillan =

Scottish judge (1805–1876)

James Craufurd, Lord Ardmillan (12 September 1805 – 7 September 1876) was a Scottish judge.

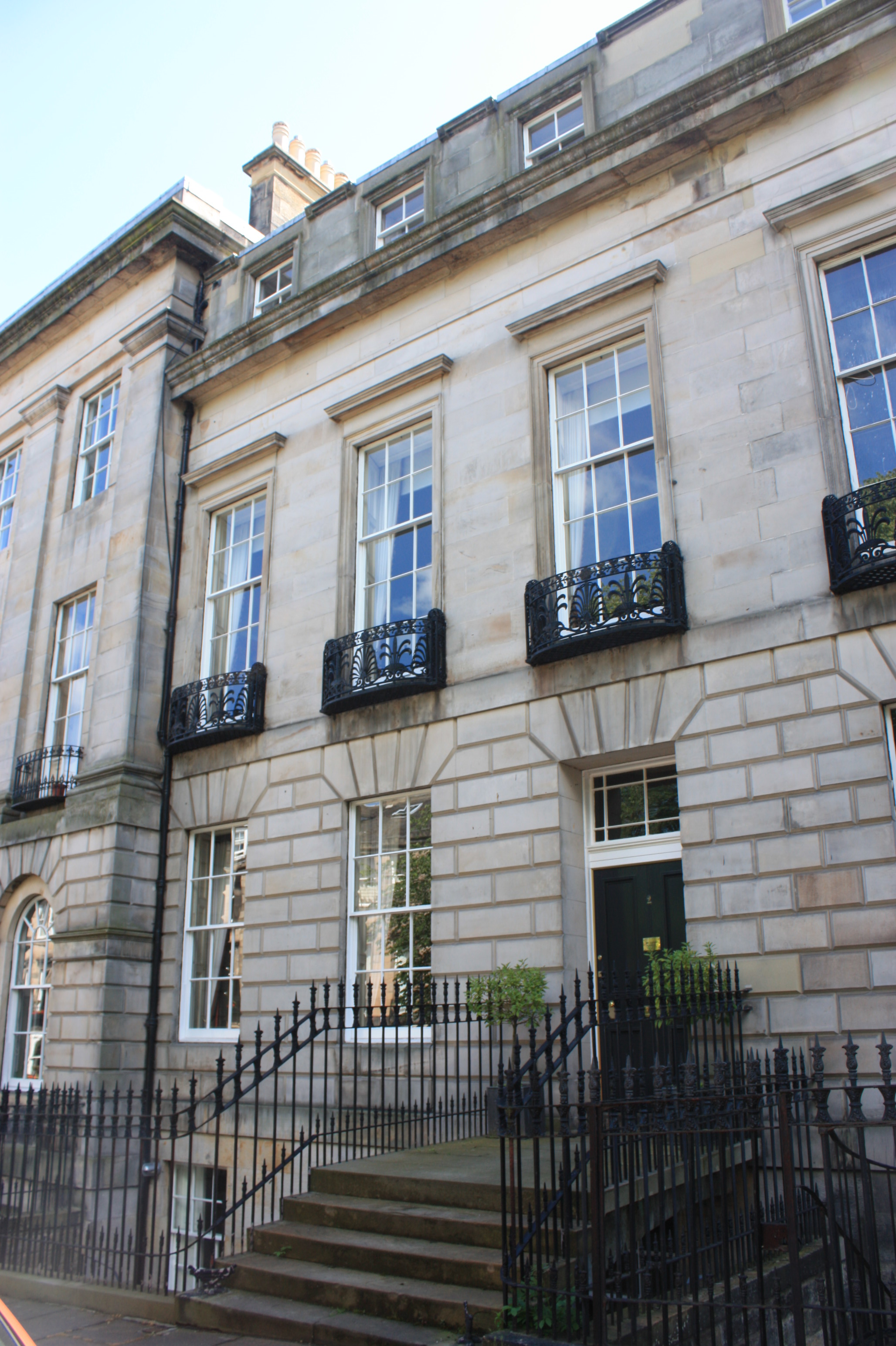
Crauford's home at 2 Doune Terrace, Edinburgh

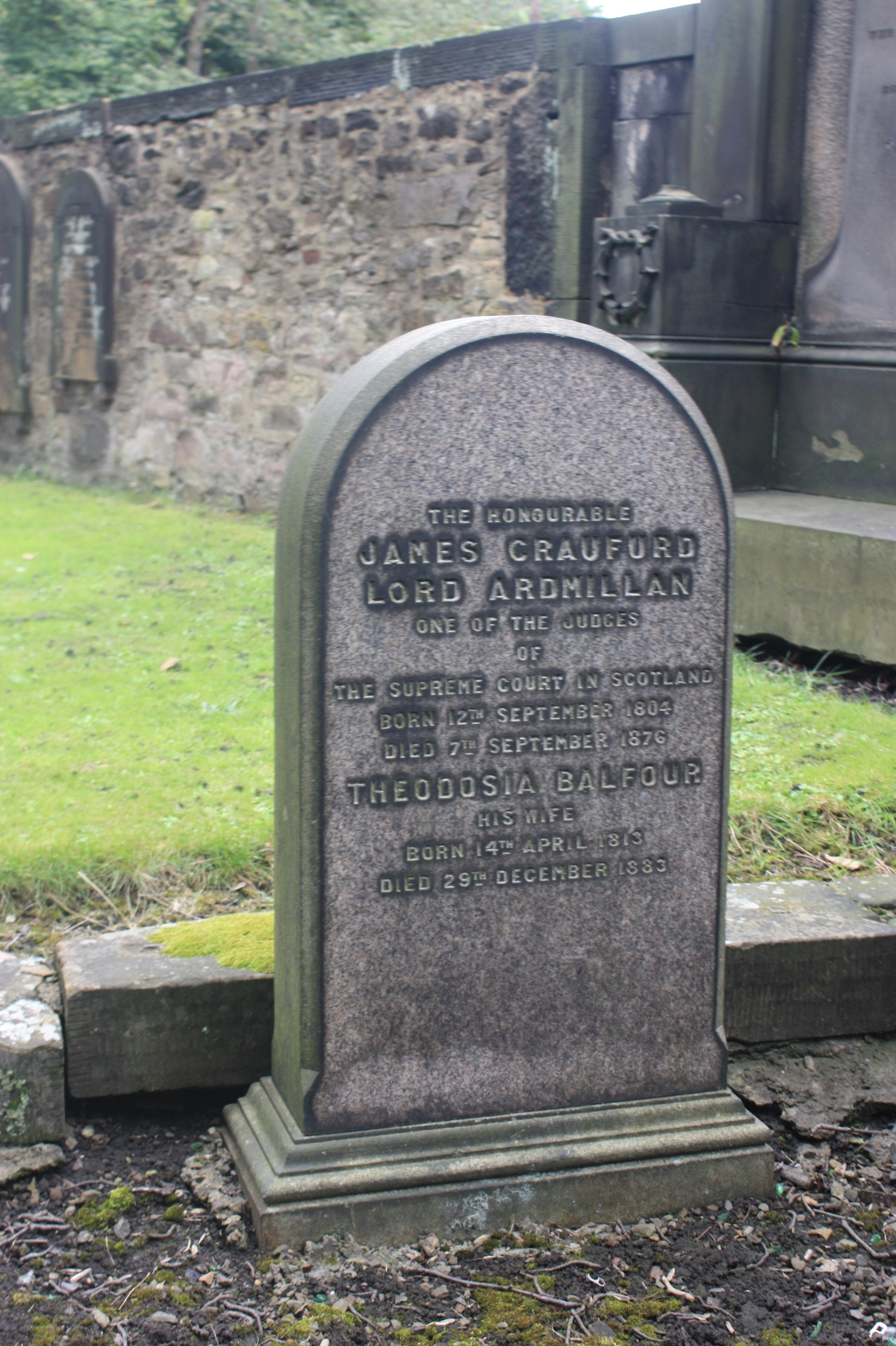
The grave of Alexander Craufurd, Lord Ardmillan, St Cuthberts, Edinburgh

== Background and education ==
Born at Havant in Hampshire, he was eldest son of Jane, eldest daughter of John Leslie, and Major Archibald Clifford Blackwell Craufurd of Ardmillan. He was educated at the Ayr Academy and the Royal High School, Edinburgh. He attend the universities of Glasgow and Edinburgh. In 1829 he passed his examination in Roman and Scots law, and became an advocate in 1829.

He temporarily settled in Edinburgh, "James Craufurd, advocate" being listed as the owner of 2 Doune Terrace on the Moray Estate in Edinburgh's fashionable west end in 1833.

== Early career ==
His progress at the bar was not rapid, but he nevertheless acquired a considerable criminal business both in the Court of Justiciary and in the church courts. He did not have much civil business, although he could address juries very effectively. On 14 March 1849 he became Sheriff of Perth, and four years later, 16 November 1853, was appointed Solicitor General for Scotland under the administration of George Hamilton-Gordon, 4th Earl of Aberdeen.

== Lord of session ==
He was nominated to the post of a Judge of the Court of Session on 10 January 1855, when he took the courtesy title of Lord Ardmillan, after the name of his paternal estate. On 16 June in the same year he was also appointed a Lord of Justiciary, and held these two places until his death.

His speeches and other literary utterances are not great performances, and his lectures to young men on ecclesiastical dogmas are open to hostile criticism, but they bear the cardinal merit of sincerity and are not without literary polish. In the court of justiciary his speeches were effective and eloquent of expression, which he had cultivated by a rather discursive study of English and Scotch poetical literature.

== Famous judgements ==
The best remembered of his judgments is that which he delivered in connection with the well-known Yelverton case, when, on 3 July 1862, acting as lord ordinary of the outer house of session, he pronounced against the legality of the supposed marriage between Maria Theresa Longworth and Major William Charles Yelverton (Cases in Court of Session, Longworth v. Yelverton, 1863, pp. 93–116; SHAW, Digest, p. 97, &c.).

== Family ==
He married in 1834 Theodosia (1813-1883), daughter of James Balfour, known before her marriage as Beauty Balfour. Craufurd died of stomach cancer at his residence, 18 Charlotte Square, Edinburgh, in 1876. His wife survived him for seven years and died in 1883, aged 70. His sister Margeurite, born 22 March 1818, married Aimé-Félix Reynaud (1808–1876) a French naval officer (ultimately vice admiral).

James and Theodosia are buried together in a simple grave in the south-west corner of St Cuthberts Churchyard in Edinburgh.

== Arms ==
Coat of arms of James Craufurd, Lord Ardmillan

Crest
A falcon hooded and belled Proper.
Escutcheon
Quarterly 1st & 4th Gules on a fess Ermine between three mullets Argent and two crescents interlaced of the field (Craufurd) 2nd & 3rd Argent a chevron Gules between three crosses crosslet fitchée Sable (Kennedy).
Motto
Durum Patientia Frango
