= Charles Thomas Kennedy =

Recipient of the Victoria Cross

Charles Thomas Kennedy VC
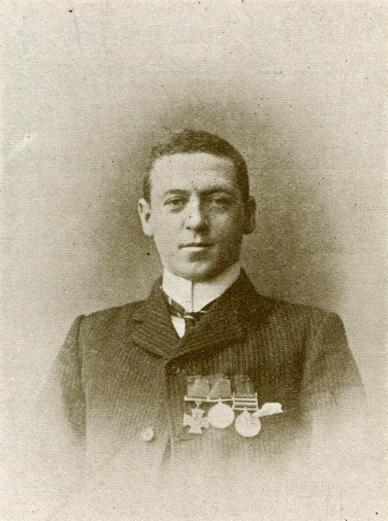
- Born: 6 January 1873; Jamaica Street, Edinburgh, Scotland
- Died: 24 April 1907 (aged 34); Leith Walk, Edinburgh
- Burial place: North Merchiston Cemetery
- Military career
- Allegiance: United Kingdom
- Branch: British Army
- Service years: 1891–1902
- Rank: Private
- Units: Highland Light Infantry
- Conflicts: Malakand Frontier War; Second Boer War
- Awards: Victoria Cross

Charles Thomas Kennedy, VC (6 January 1873 – 24 April 1907) was a Scottish recipient of the Victoria Cross, the highest and most prestigious award for gallantry in the face of the enemy that can be awarded to British and Commonwealth forces.

== Details ==
Kennedy was 27 years, and a private in the 1st Battalion, The Highland Light Infantry, British Army during the Second Boer War when the following deed took place at Dewetsdorp, South Africa for which he was awarded the VC.

At Dewetsdorp on the 22nd November, 1900, Private Kennedy carried a comrade, who was dangerously wounded and bleeding to death, from Gibraltar Hill to the Hospital, a distance of three-quarters of a mile, under a very hot fire. On the following day, volunteers having been called for to take a message to the Commandant across a space over which it was almost certain death to venture, Private Kennedy at once stepped forward. He did not, however, succeed in delivering the message as he was severely wounded before he had gone 20 yards.

Kennedy received the Victoria Cross from King Edward VII at an impressive investiture held at St James's Palace on 17 December 1901. He had, by now, returned to England and been posted to the 2nd Battalion, The Highland Light Infantry. He subsequently failed to meet the Army's physical requirements owing to his wound and was discharged from the Service on 25 June 1902. He then returned to Edinburgh, but was fatally injured in 1907, when a horse bolted in Leith Walk, and its cart threatened the lives of passers-by. He died between Brunswick Road and the Infirmary.

== Further information ==
He is buried in North Merchiston Cemetery, Edinburgh, the city in which he was born. He has since had a street in Fountainbridge where he was brought up named in his honour and a bench placed in the Grassmarket area, again, near where he lived as a boy.

== The medal ==
His Victoria Cross is displayed at the Museum of The Royal Highland Fusiliers, Glasgow, Scotland.

== See also ==
- List of Scottish Victoria Cross recipients
