= James Davis (VC) =

Scottish recipient of the Victoria Cross (1835–1893)

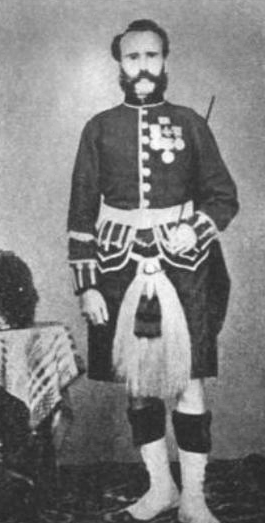
- Born: James Davis Kelly; February 1835; Edinburgh, Scotland
- Died: 2 March 1893 (aged 58); Edinburgh, Scotland
- Burial place: North Merchiston Cemetery
- Military career
- Allegiance: United Kingdom
- Branch: British Army
- Rank: Private
- Units: 42nd Regiment of Foot
- Conflicts: Crimean War; Indian Mutiny
- Awards: Victoria Cross

James Davis VC (February 1835 – 2 March 1893) was a Scottish recipient of the Victoria Cross, the highest and most prestigious award for gallantry in the face of the enemy that can be awarded to British and Commonwealth forces.

His full name was James Davis Kelly, but he dropped Kelly when he enlisted

== Details ==
Davis was approximately 23 years old, and a private in the 42nd Regiment of Foot, later The Black Watch (Royal Highlanders), British Army during the Indian Mutiny when the following deed took place on 15 April 1858 during the attack on Fort Ruhya, India for which he was awarded the VC.

For conspicuous gallantry, at the attack on the Fort of Ruhya, when, with an advanced party, to point out the gate of the Fort to the Engineer Officer, Private Davis offered to carry the body of Lieutenant Bramley, who was killed at this point, to the Regiment. He performed this duty, of danger and affection under the very walls of the Fort.

His VC is on display in the Lord Ashcroft Gallery at the Imperial War Museum, London.
