= 13th Lancers =

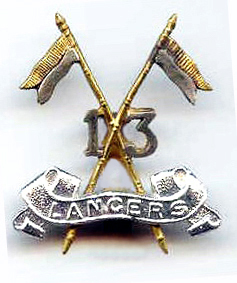
- Active: 1817–present
- Country: British India; Pakistan
- Allegiance: (United Kingdom) British Crown 1804–1947; President of Pakistan 1947–present
- Branch: British Indian Army; Pakistan Army
- Type: Armoured Regiment
- Nickname: The Spearhead Regiment
- Mascot: Elephant
- Engagements: Second Anglo-Maratha War 1804-05; First Afghan War 1839-42; Second Sikh War 1848-49; Indian Mutiny 1857-58; Second Afghan War 1878-80; Third Anglo-Burmese War 1885-87; First World War 1914-18; Third Afghan War 1919; Second World War 1939-45; Indo-Pakistani War of 1965; Indo-Pakistani War of 1971

Commanders
- Current commander: Maj Gen. Muhammad Ali Khan, HI(M)

The 13th Lancers is an armoured regiment of Pakistan Army. It was formed in 1923 as 13th Duke of Connaught's Own Lancers by the amalgamation of 31st Duke of Connaught's Own Lancers and 32nd Lancers. On Partition of India in 1947, the regiment was allotted to Pakistan.

== Formation ==
The two parent regiments of 13th Lancers had a common origin in the old Bombay Squadron of Cavalry, raised for service in the Second Anglo-Maratha War. The squadron was split to form the 1st and 2nd Regiments of Bombay Light Cavalry in 1817. More than a hundred years later, they were reunited to form the 13th Duke of Connaught's Own Bombay Lancers in 1923.

== 31st Duke of Connaught's Own Lancers ==
The 1st Bombay Light Cavalry served in the First Afghan War in 1839 when they fought in the Battle of Ghazni and took part in the march to Kabul. During the Second Sikh War of 1848-49 the regiment took part in the Siege of Multan, where they remained as the garrison for the remainder of the campaign. At the start of the Great Mutiny of 1857, the regiment was stationed at Nasirabad, where they were the only ones to remain loyal. Artillery and infantrymen urged them to go over to them but the sowars refused and, under their officers, charged in an attempt to take the guns. They failed to do so but successfully disengaged and took part in the campaign of pacification in Central India. Burma was their next overseas posting in 1885, where they fought in the Third Anglo-Burmese War. The Duke of Connaught (Prince Arthur, Duke of Connaught and Strathearn (1850-1942), the seventh child and third son of Queen Victoria), then Commander-in-Chief of the Bombay Army, became their Colonel-in-Chief in 1890. He still held the appointment in the 13th DCO Lancers on his death in January 1942. During the Kitchener reorganisation of the Indian Army of 1903, the Bombay cavalry had thirty added to their numbers and, the 1st (Duke of Connaught's Own) Bombay Lancers became the 31st Duke of Connaught's Own Lancers. During the Great War, the 31st Duke of Connaught's Own Lancers remained on the North West Frontier of India. In 1919, they served in the Third Afghan War and then went to perform garrison duties in Palestine.

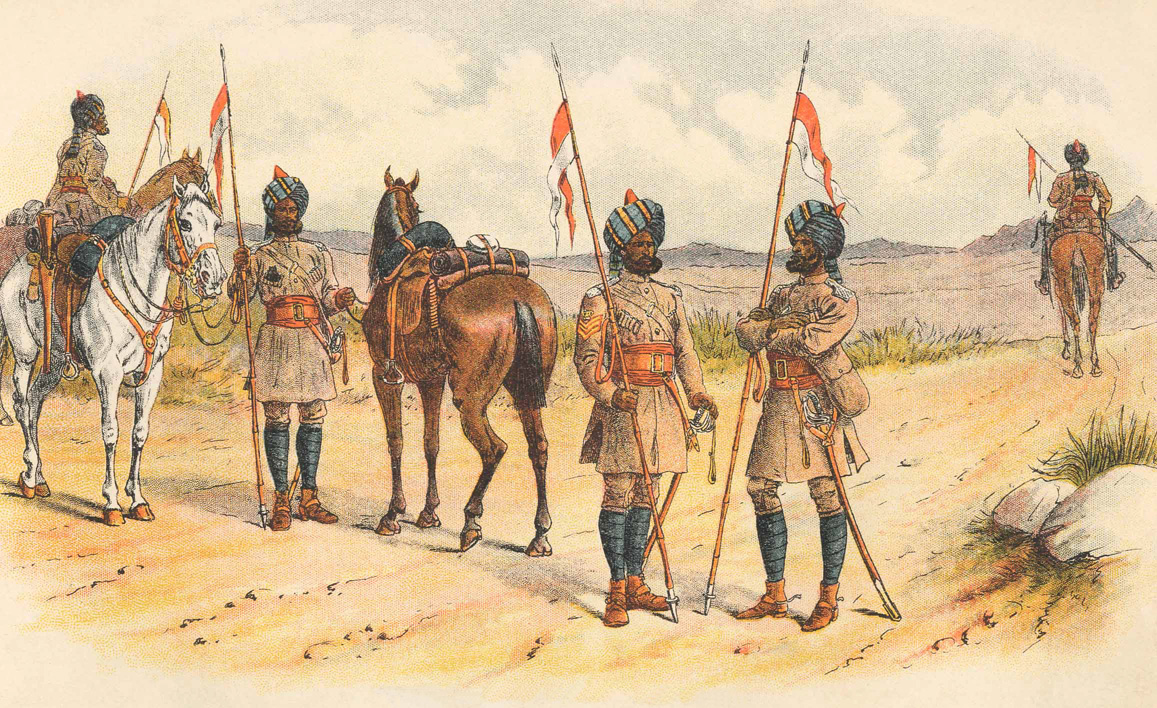
1st Bombay Lancers (Field Service Order). Coloured lithograph by Richard Simkin, 1885.

- 1804 Native Troop of Cavalry
- 1816 1st Native Troop of Cavalry
- 1817 1st Regiment of Bombay Light Cavalry
- 1842 1st Regiment of Bombay Light Cavalry (Lancers)
- 1861 1st Regiment of Bombay Silladar Light Cavalry
- 1861 1st Regiment of Bombay Light Cavalry
- 1880 1st Bombay Lancers
- 1890 1st (Duke of Connaught's Own) Bombay Lancers
- 1903 31st Duke of Connaught's Own Lancers

== 32nd Lancers ==
The 2nd Bombay Light Cavalry were stationed at Neemuch in 1857 and took part in the pacification of Central India. One of its officers, Captain James Blair, won the Victoria Cross during these operations. Under Kitchener's Reforms, the 2nd Bombay Lancers was redesignated as the 32nd Lancers.

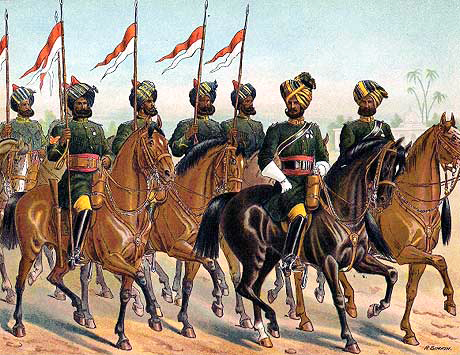
2nd Bombay Lancers (Review Order). Coloured lithograph by Richard Simkin, 1885.

During the Great War, the 32nd went to Mesopotamia late in 1916 and from 1 January to 3 March 1917 two squadrons of the regiment formed part of III (Tigris) Corps Cavalry Regiment, which were the first British troops to Capture Baghdad. In April 1917, at the Battle of Istabulat, a detachment led by the commanding officer, charged an entrenched Turkish position resulting in all the officers and most of the men becoming casualties.

- 1816 2nd Native Troop of Cavalry
- 1817 2nd Regiment of Bombay Light Cavalry
- 1861 2nd Regiment of Bombay Silladar Light Cavalry
- 1861 2nd Regiment of Bombay Light Cavalry
- 1883 2nd Bombay Lancers
- 1903 32nd Lancers

== 13th Duke of Connaught's Own Lancers ==
After the First World War, the number of Indian cavalry regiments was reduced from thirty-nine to twenty-one. However, instead of disbanding the surplus units, it was decided to amalgamate them in pairs. This resulted in the renumbering and renaming of the entire cavalry line. In September 1923, the 31st Duke of Connaught's Own Lancers were amalgamated with the 32nd Lancers to form the 13th Duke of Connaught's Own Bombay Lancers. This particular merger was a reunion of two regiments separated more than a hundred years before. The new badge was crossed lances with '13' on the intersection; a crown above and a scroll below, reading 'Duke of Connaught's Own.' Their uniform was blue with scarlet facings, and the new class composition was one squadron each of Pathans, Muslim Rajputs and Sikhs. In 1927, the regiment was redesignated as the 13th Duke of Connaught's Own Lancers.

The 13th Duke of Connaught's Own Lancers were one of the first two Indian cavalry regiments nominated for mechanisation. One squadron was equipped with the Vickers Medium Mark I tank and two squadrons with armoured cars. They were deployed on frontier duties but in April 1941, left for Iraq with the 10th Indian Division. They saw action against the Vichy French in Syria and also served in Persia and Iraq before joining the British Eighth Army in North Africa. In October 1942, they moved back to Persia and then to India. After the Japanese surrender in 1945, the regiment moved to Java in the Dutch East Indies in support of the 5th and 23rd Indian Divisions, who were engaged in suppressing a revolt by the Indonesians. In August 1946 the regiment returned to Secunderabad and on Partition of India in August 1947, the 13th Duke of Connaught's Own Lancers were allotted to the Pakistan Army.

- 1923 13th Duke of Connaught's Own Bombay Lancers (amalgamation of 31st and 32nd Lancers)
- 1927 13th Duke of Connaught's Own Lancers
- 1956 13th Lancers

In 1956, Pakistan became a Republic and all titles pertaining to British royalty were dropped. The regiment was now designated as 13th Lancers. During the Indo-Pakistani War of 1965, the regiment spearheaded the advance of the Pakistan Army towards Akhnoor in Kashmir. Fighting with elan, it penetrated 23 miles inside enemy territory. During the Indo-Pakistani War of 1971, the 13th Lancers launched a counter-attack against invading Indian forces at Barapind near Zafarwal and suffered heavy casualties. Between 1996 and 1997, the regiment served as part of the UN peacekeeping force of UNTAES in former Yugoslavia.

== Battle honours ==
Ghuznee 1839, Afghanistan 1839, Mooltan, Punjaub, Central India, Afghanistan 1879–80, Burma 1885–87, Kut al Amara 1917, Baghdad, Sharqat, Mesopotamia 1916–18, NW Frontier, India 1917, Afghanistan 1919, Damascus, Deir ez Zor, Raqaa, Syria 1941, Gazala, Bir Hacheim, El Adem, Sidi Rezegh 1942, Gambut, Tobruk 1942, Fuka, North Africa 1940–43, Dewa-Chamb 1965, Jaurian 1965, Zafarwal 1971.

== Notable officers ==
- General James Blair, VC, CB (Victoria Cross recipient; Resident at Aden 1882–1885)
- General Sir Robert Cassels, GCB, GCSI, DSO (Commander-in-Chief in India 1935–1941)
- General Sir Frank Messervy, KCSI, KBE, CB, DSO & Bar (World War II Commander & First Commander-in-Chief of Pakistan Army 1947–48)
- General Sir Francis Robert Roy Bucher, KBE, CB, MC (Commander-in-Chief of Indian Army 1948–49)
- General Muhammad Zia-ul-Haq (President 1978-88 and Chief of Army Staff 1976–1988)
- General Jehangir Karamat, NI (M), TBt (Chief of Army Staff 1996–1998)
- Brigadier Mervyn Cardoza, Tamgha-e-Khidmat, Director Logistics 1971
- Gen Naveed Mukhtar, DG ISI, Ex-Corps Commander Karachi, Pakistan
