= Ardmillan Castle =

Scottish castle

Coordinates: 55°12′39″N 4°52′43″W

Ardmillan Castle is a ruinous Scottish castle dating from the late 16th century.

It lies on the A77 on the edge of the Firth of Clyde south of Girvan.

== History ==
On 7 August 1563, Mary, Queen of Scots, stayed at Ardmillan before moving on to Ardstinchar Castle.

The original structure was built in the late 16th century on a low mound. It was originally a rectangular tower with circular towers on the corners. The two northern towers have been removed.

It was built and owned by the Kennedys of Bargany until 1658, it then passing through marriage to the Crawfords of Baidland. By 1688 it had a motte (wide ditch) built on all sides.

In the 18th century a classical wing and new formal front was added and it took on more of the appearance of a house rather than a fortification, and was sometimes referred to as Ardmillan House.

By 1892 it had an enclosed courtyard built at its base.

It suffered in a fire in the early 20th century and again in 1973 leaving the property ruinous. The grounds have been used as a caravan park since 1980.
