= William Gardner (VC) =

Scottish recipient of the Victoria Cross

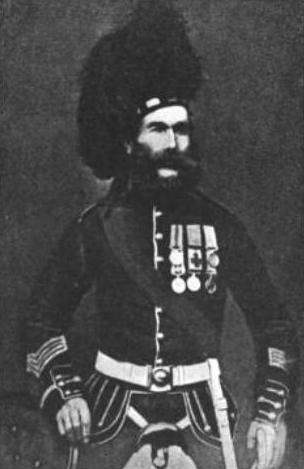
- Born: 3 March 1821; Nemphlar, Lanarkshire
- Died: 24 October 1897 (aged 76); Bothwell, Lanarkshire
- Burial place: Bothwell Park Cemetery
- Military career
- Allegiance: United Kingdom
- Branch: British Army
- Rank: Sergeant-Major
- Units: 42nd Regiment of Foot
- Conflicts: Crimean War; Indian Mutiny
- Awards: Victoria Cross; Distinguished Conduct Medal

William Gardner VC DCM (3 March 1821 – 24 October 1897) was a Scottish recipient of the Victoria Cross, the highest and most prestigious award for gallantry in the face of the enemy that can be awarded to British and Commonwealth forces.

== Details ==
He was 37 years old, and a colour-sergeant in the 42nd Regiment of Foot (later The Black Watch (Royal Highlanders)), British Army during the Indian Mutiny when the following deed took place on 5 May 1858 at Bareilly, India for which he was awarded the VC:

For his conspicuous and gallant conduct on the morning of the 5th of May last, in having saved the life of Lieutenant-Colonel Cameron, his Commanding Officer, who during the action at Bareilly on that day, had been knocked from his horse, when three Fanatics rushed upon him. Colour-Sergeant Gardner ran out, and in a moment bayoneted two of them, and was in the act of attacking the third, when he was shot down by another soldier of the Regiment.

— Letter from Captain Macpherson, 42nd Regiment, to Lieutenant-Colonel Cameron, Commanding that Regiment.

== Further information ==
He later achieved the rank of sergeant-Major. His medal was sold by one of his descendants to raise money for charity. His VC is on display in the Lord Ashcroft Gallery at the Imperial War Museum, London.
