= James Blair (Indian Army officer) =

Recipient of the Victoria Cross

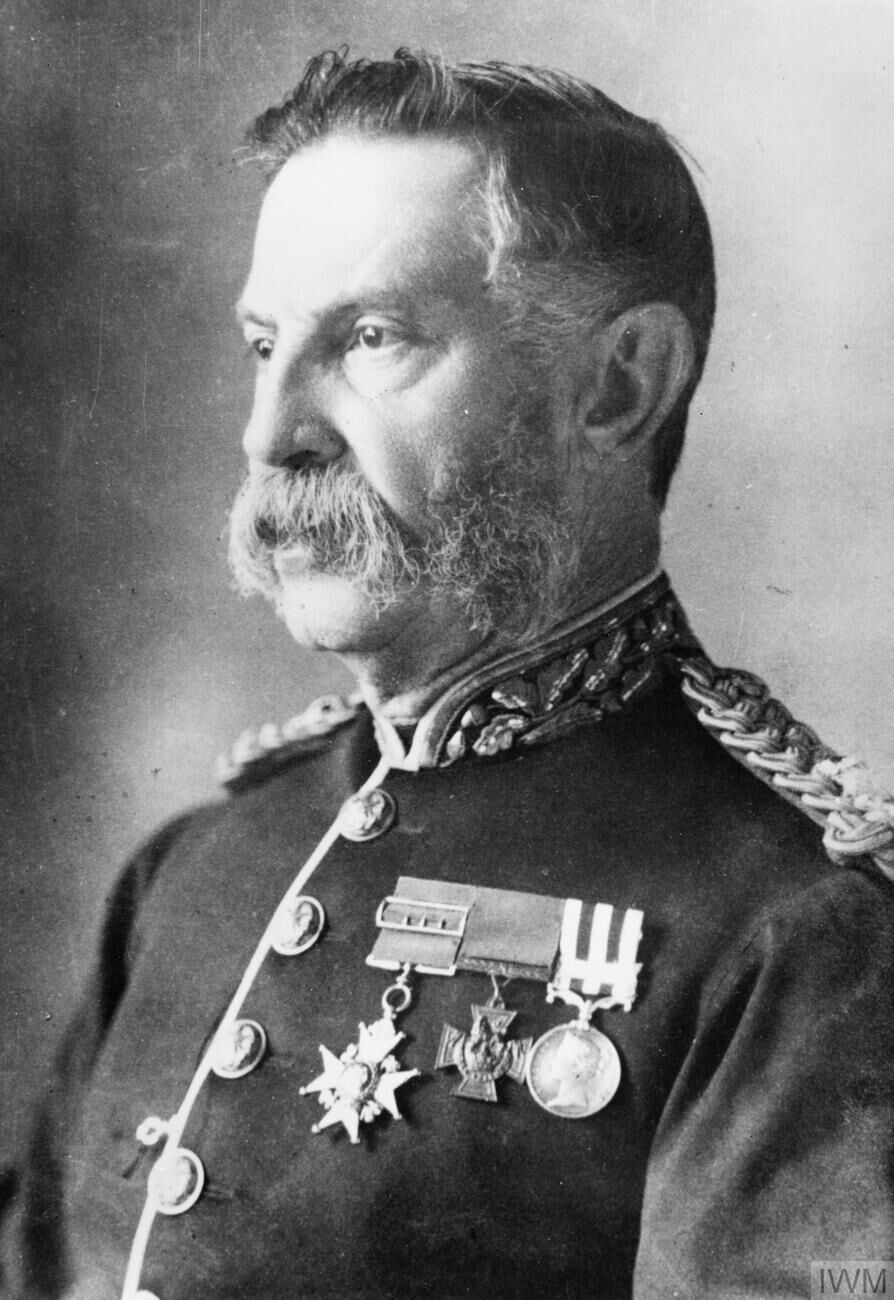
- Born: 27 January 1828; Neemuch, British India
- Died: 18 January 1905 (aged 76); Melrose, Scottish Borders
- Burial place: Trinity Churchyard, Melrose
- Relatives: Robert Blair VC (cousin)
- Military career
- Allegiance: United Kingdom
- Branch: Bengal Army; British Indian Army
- Rank: General
- Conflicts: Indian Mutiny
- Awards: Victoria Cross; Order of the Bath
- Other work: British Resident in Aden

General James Blair VC CB (27 January 1828 – 18 January 1905) was a Scottish recipient of the Victoria Cross (VC), the highest and most prestigious award for gallantry in the face of the enemy that can be awarded to members of British and Commonwealth forces.

Blair was born in Neemuch, Gwalior State in India, the son of a captain in the Bengal Cavalry. He was commissioned into the 2nd Bombay Light Cavalry, Bombay Army in 1844, becoming a Lieutenant in 1848.

He was 29 years old, and a captain in the 2nd Bombay Light Cavalry during the Indian Mutiny when the following deeds took place for which he was awarded the VC.

For having on two occasions distinguished himself by his gallant and daring conduct.

1. On the night of the 12th of August, 1857, at Neemuch, in volunteering to apprehend 7 or 8 armed mutineers who had shut themselves up for defence in a house, the door of which he burst open. He then rushed in among them and forced them to escape through the roof; in this encounter, he was severely wounded. In spite of his wounds he pursued the fugitives, but was unable to come up with them, in consequence of the darkness of the night.

2. On the 23rd of October, 1857, at Jeerum, in fighting his way most gallantly through a Body of rebels who had literally surrounded him. After breaking the end of his sword on one of their heads, and receiving a severe sword cut on his fight arm, he rejoined his troop. In this wounded condition, and with no other weapon than the hilt of his broken sword, he put himself at the head of his men, charged the rebels most effectually, and dispersed them.

Blair served until the end of the Indian Mutiny, mainly in Central India, including the pursuit of Tatya Tope.

Continuing to serve in the Indian Army, Blair acted as Political Resident at Aden between 1882 and 1885 with the rank of brigadier-general. He was promoted major-general 1885, and in 1889 became a lieutenant-general and was appointed a companion of the Order of the Bath. He was placed on the unemployed supernumerary list in 1890. In retirement he was promoted general in 1894 and appointed colonel of the 32nd Lancers in 1904.

Blair died at his home in Melrose, Roxburghshire in January 1905, age of 76 and was buried at Trinity Churchyard, Melrose.

He was the cousin of Captain Robert Blair, who also won the VC in the Indian Mutiny.
