= James Craig (VC) =

Scottish Victoria Cross recipient (1824-1861)

James Craig VC
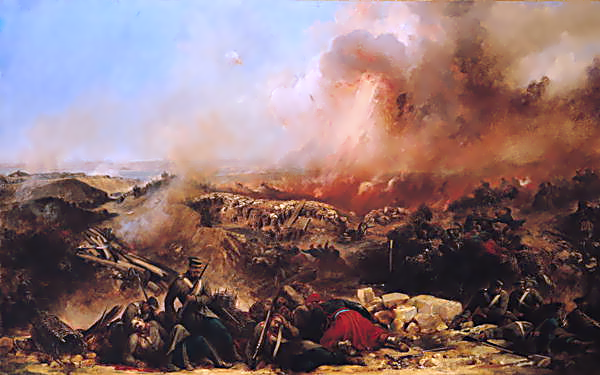
- Depiction of the Siege of Sebastopol
- Born: 10 September 1824; Perth, Scotland
- Died: 18 March 1861 (aged 36); Swartkops River, Near Grahamstown
- Burial place: St Mary's Cemetery, Port Elizabeth
- Military career
- Allegiance: United Kingdom
- Branch: British Army
- Rank: Lieutenant
- Units: Scots Fusilier Guards; Military Train
- Conflicts: Crimean War
- Awards: Victoria Cross

James Craig VC (10 September 1824 – 18 March 1861) was a Scottish recipient of the Victoria Cross, the highest and most prestigious award for gallantry in the face of the enemy that can be awarded to British and Commonwealth forces.

Craig was a former serjeant in the Scots Fusilier Guards, who had been commissioned as an ensign in 3rd Battalion, Military Train, British Army during the Crimean War. He was 30 years old, and serving as battalion adjutant when he carried out the action which is described in his citation for the award of the Victoria Cross, which was gazetted on 20 November 1857.

War Office, November 18, 1857

THE Queen has been graciously pleased to signify her intention to confer the Decoration of the Victoria Cross on the undermentioned Officers and Non-Commissioned Officer of Her Majesty's Army, who have been recommended to Her Majesty for that Decoration,—in accordance with the rules laid down in Her Majesty's Warrant of the 29th January, 1856,—on account of Acts of Bravery performed by them before the enemy during the late War, as recorded against their several names, viz.:

[...]

Military Train, 3rd Battalion (late Serjeant, Scots Fusilier Guards)

Ensign and Adjutant James Craig, Date of Act of Bravery, 6th September, 1855

For having volunteered, and personally collected other volunteers, to go out under a heavy fire of grape and small arms, on the night of the 6th September, 1855, when in the right advanced sap, in front of the Redan, to look for Captain Buckley, Scots Fusilier Guards, who was supposed to be wounded.

Serjeant Craig brought in, with the assistance of a Drummer, the body of that Officer, whom he found dead,—in the performance of which act he was wounded.

He later achieved the rank of lieutenant.

His Victoria Cross is displayed at The Guards Regimental Headquarters (Scots Guards RHQ) in Wellington Barracks, London, England.
