= Béhagnies =

- Commune
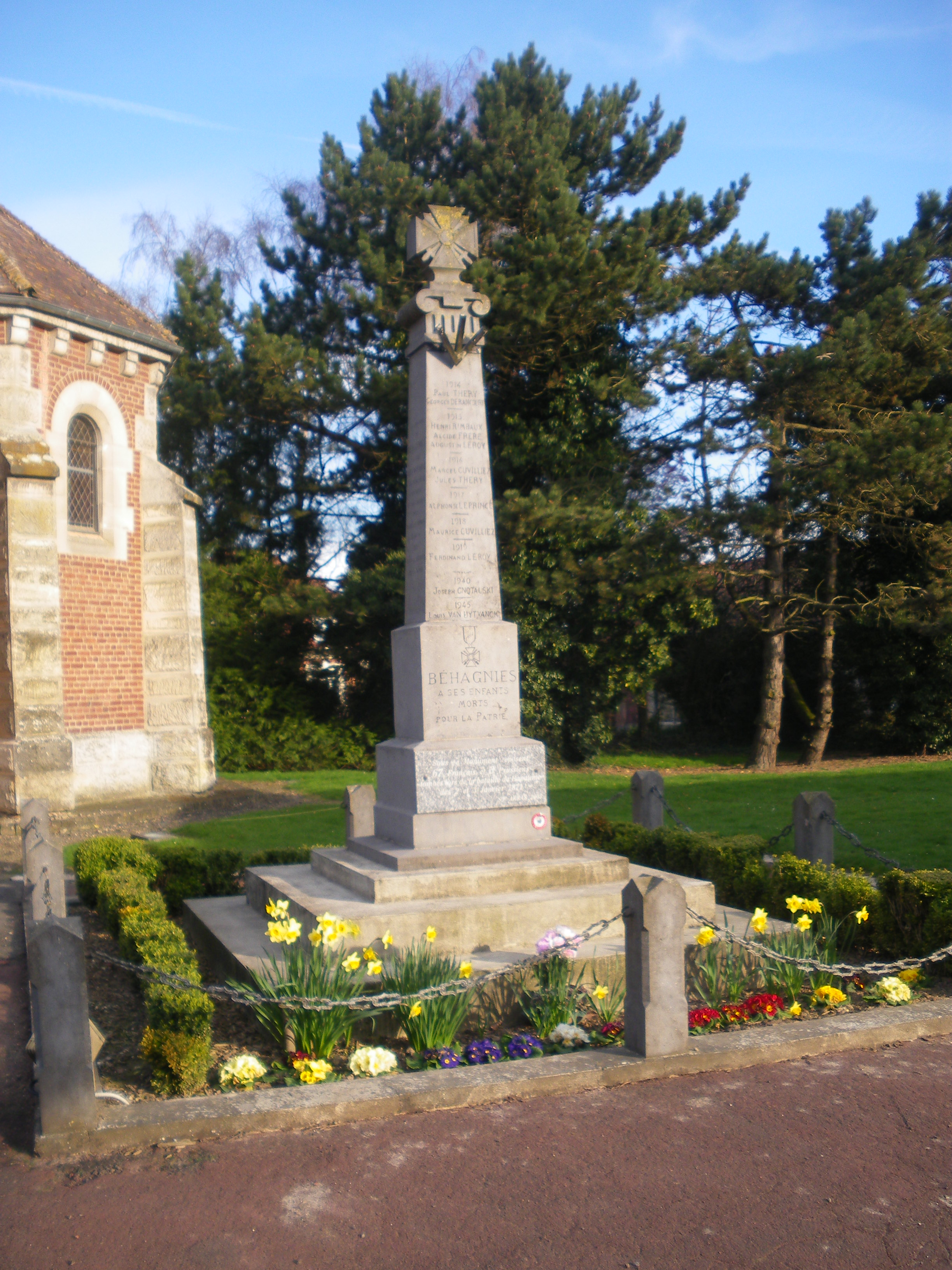
- The War memorial

- Coat of arms
- Location of Béhagnies
- Location within France Location within Hauts-de-France
- Coordinates: 50°08′28″N 2°49′50″E
- Country: France
- Region: Hauts-de-France
- Department: Pas-de-Calais
- Arrondissement: Arras
- Canton: Bapaume
- Intercommunality: CC du Sud-Artois

Government
  - Mayor (2020–2026): Régis Leleu
- Area^{1}: 3.06 km^{2} (1.18 sq mi)
- Elevation: 108 m (354 ft)
- Highest elevation: 122 m (400 ft)
- Lowest elevation: 93 m (305 ft)
- Population (2023): 114
  - Density: 37.3/km^{2} (96.5/sq mi)
- Time zone: UTC+01:00 (CET)
  - Summer (DST): UTC+02:00 (CEST)
- INSEE/Postal code: 62103 /62121
- ^{1} French Land Register data, which excludes lakes, ponds, glaciers > 1 km^{2} (0.386 sq mi or 247 acres) and river estuaries.

Béhagnies (French pronunciation: [be.aɲi]) is a commune in the Pas-de-Calais department in the Hauts-de-France region in northern France.

== Geography ==
A small farming village located 13 miles (21 km) south of Arras on the N17 road, at the junction with the D31.

== Population ==
Historical population
Year	Pop.	±% p.a.
1968	151	—
1975	137	−1.38%
1982	133	−0.42%
1990	115	−1.80%
1999	127	+1.11%
2007	131	+0.39%
2012	115	−2.57%
2017	126	+1.84%
2023	114	−1.65%
Source: INSEE

== Sights ==
- The church of St. Martin, dating from the twentieth century

== See also ==
- Communes of the Pas-de-Calais department
