= Edward Spence (VC) =

Scottish recipient of the Victoria Cross

- Born: 28 December 1830; Dumfries, Scotland
- Died: 17 April 1858 (aged 27); Fort Ruhya, Oude
- Burial place: Fort Ruhya Cemetery
- Military career
- Allegiance: United Kingdom
- Branch: British Army
- Rank: Private
- Units: 42nd Regiment of Foot
- Conflicts: Crimean War; Indian Mutiny
- Awards: Victoria Cross

Edward Spence VC (28 December 1830 – 17 April 1858) was a Scottish recipient of the Victoria Cross, the highest and most prestigious award for gallantry in the face of the enemy that can be awarded to British and Commonwealth forces.

== Details ==
Spence was 27 years old, and a private in the 42nd Regiment of Foot (later The Black Watch (Royal Highlanders)), British Army during the Indian Mutiny when the following deed took place for which he was awarded the VC. On 15 April 1858 during the attack on Fort Ruhya, India, Private Spence volunteered along with Lance-Corporal Alexander Thompson, to assist captain William Martin Cafe in bringing in the body of a lieutenant from the top of the glacis. His citation read:

Private Edward Spence, 42nd Regiment, would have been recommended to Her Majesty for the decoration of the Victoria Cross had he survived. He and Lance-Corporal Thompson, of that Regiment, volunteered, at the attack of the Fort of Ruhya, on the 10th April, 1858, to assist Captain Cafe, commanding the 4th Punjab Rifles, in bringing in the body of Lieutenant Willoughby from the top of the Glacis. Private Spence dauntlessly placed himself in an exposed position so as to cover the party bearing away the body. He died on the 17th of the same month from the effects of the wound which he received on the occasion.

== The medal ==
His Victoria Cross is displayed at the Black Watch Museum, Perth, Scotland.
