= Robert Blair (VC) =

Scottish recipient of the Victoria Cross

- Robert Blair
- Born: 13 March 1834; Linlithgow, Scotland
- Died: 28 March 1859 (aged 25); Cawnpore, India
- Burial place: Old British Cemetery, Cawnpore
- Relatives: James Blair (cousin)
- Military career
- Allegiance: United Kingdom
- Branch: British Army
- Service years: 1855–1859
- Rank: Captain
- Units: 2nd Dragoon Guards (Queen's Bays); 9th Lancers
- Conflicts: Indian Mutiny
- Awards: Victoria Cross

Robert Blair VC (13 March 1834 – 28 March 1859) was a Scottish recipient of the Victoria Cross, the highest and most prestigious award for gallantry in the face of the enemy that can be awarded to British and Commonwealth forces.

He was 23 years old, and a lieutenant in the 2nd Dragoon Guards (Queen's Bays), British Army, attached to 9th Lancers (The Queen's Royal) during the Indian Mutiny when the following deed took place on 28 September 1857 at Bulandshahr, India, for which he was awarded the VC.

Lieutenant Robert Blair. Date of Act of Bravery, 28th September, 1857

" A most gallant feat was here performed by Lieutenant Blair, who was ordered to take a party of one sergeant and twelve men and bring in a deserted ammunition waggon. As his party approached, a body of fifty or sixty of the enemy's horse came down upon him, from a village, where they had remained unobserved: without a moment's hesitation he formed up his men, and, regardless of the odds, gallantly led them on, dashing through the rebels. He made good his retreat without losing a man, leaving nine of them dead on the field. Of these he killed four himself; but, to my regret, after having run a native officer through the body with his sword, he was severely wounded, the joint of his shoulder being nearly severed."

Despatch from Major-General James Hope Grant, K.C.B., dated 10th January, 1858.

Blair was a graduate of University of Glasgow and a Snell exhibitioner at Balliol College, Oxford. Blair joined the army in 1855 in the service of the 9th Lancers and later transferred to the 2nd Dragoon Guards. He later achieved the rank of captain and died of smallpox in Cawnpore, India, on 28 March 1859. He was the cousin of another Indian Mutiny VC recipient James Blair.

His Victoria Cross is displayed at the Queen's Dragoon Guards Regimental Museum in Cardiff Castle, Wales.
