= Fort Ruhya =

Building in India

Fort Ruhya was a fort in Awadh, India (Called Oudh in historical British texts). It was the site of conflict during the Indian rebellion of 1857, during which 4 soldiers of the British Army were awarded the Victoria Cross. Today, there is a cemetery where one of the recipients, Edward Spence, is interred.

== See also ==
- List of Indian Mutiny Victoria Cross recipients
