= Cameronians War Memorial =

Memorial in Glasgow, Scotland

Coordinates: 55°52′10″N 4°17′32″W

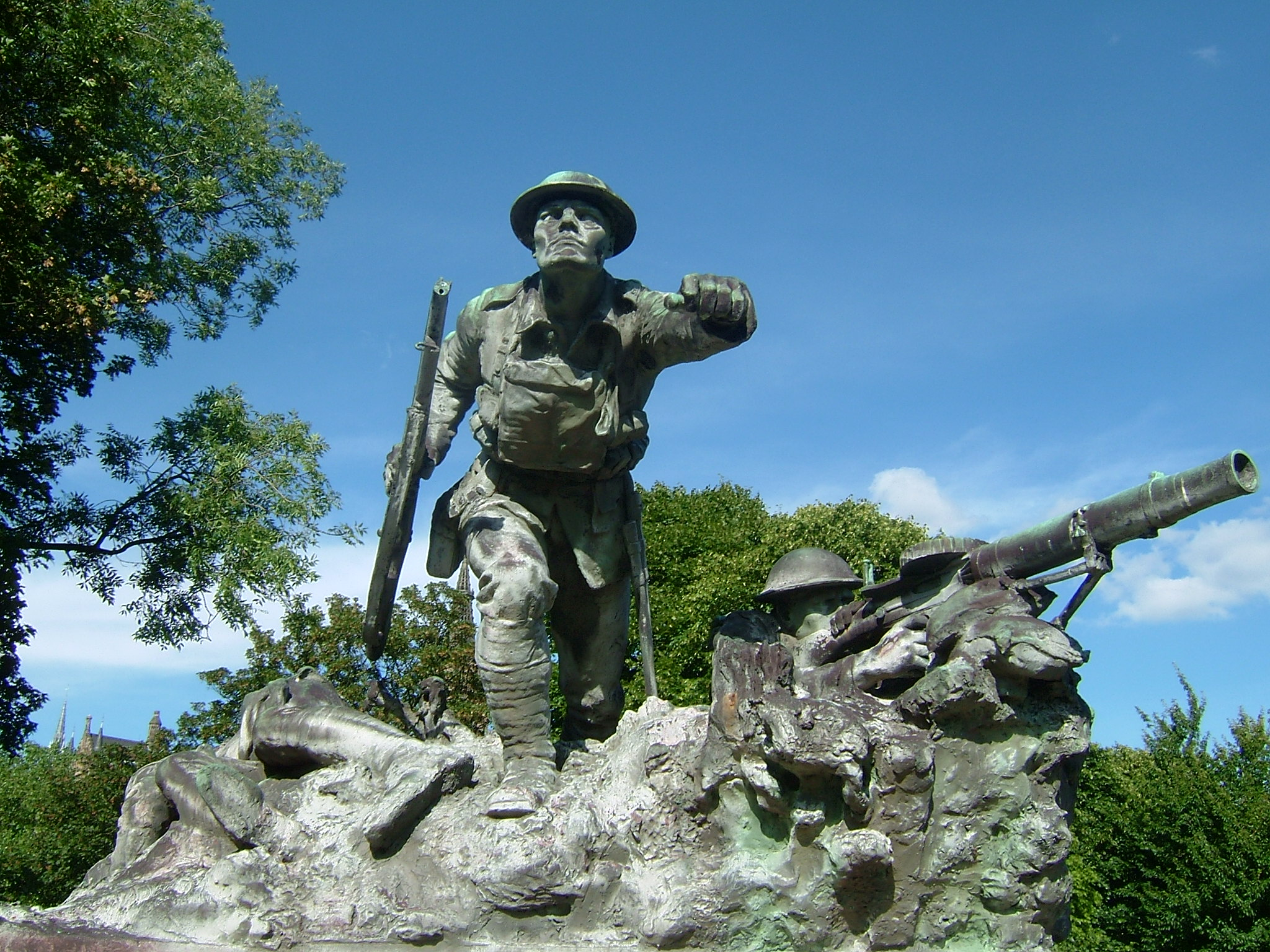

The Cameronians War Memorial is a war memorial in Kelvingrove Park in the west of Glasgow, Scotland, to the north of Kelvingrove Art Gallery and Museum. It commemorates the service of the Cameronians (Scottish Rifles) regiment in the First and Second World Wars. The memorial includes a bronze sculpture representing a machine gun emplacement, with three human figures. It became a Category B listed building in 1988.

== Background ==
The sculpture was designed by Philip Lindsey Clark. He had enlisted as a private in the Artists' Rifles in 1914, and was commissioned in the 11th (Service) (1st South Down) Battalion of the Royal Sussex Regiment in 1916, ending the war as a captain with a DSO.

== Description ==
The memorial includes a bronze statue with three cast figures of soldiers, slightly larger than life size, cast by the Manenti foundry in London. From right to left, the three figures are: one in a trench firing his Lewis machine gun, while a sergeant to his right advances holding a rifle, and further right an officer lies wounded. The advancing sergeant symbolises victory and may be modelled on Cameronian Pipe Major Jimmy Sanderson, while the wounded officer represents sacrifice. The sculpture now stands on a rectangular grey granite plinth, on a slightly larger base, raised on three steps, enclosed by hedges and a wrought iron fence.

Three plaques on the main west front bear the inscriptions, from the top: "TO THE GLORIOUS MEMORY OF ALL RANKS / THE CAMERONIANS (SCOTTISH RIFLES) WHO, / TO UPHOLD LIBERTY AND JUSTICE IN THE WORLD, / LAID DOWN THEIR LIVES IN THE TWO WORLD WARS 1914 – 1918 AND 1939 – 1945", then: "THE 6/7TH BATTALION, CAMERONIANS (SCOTTISH RIFLES) / WAS DISBANDED ON THE 31ST MARCH 1967 / AND THE 1ST REGULAR BATTALION ON THE 14TH MAY 1968 / THUS ENDING THE REGIMENT'S LONG MILITARY ASSOCIATION / WITH THE CITY OF GLASGOW", and finally: "THIS PLAQUE WAS UNVEILED BY / THE LORD PROVOST OF GLASGOW / THE RT. HON. JOHN JOHNSTON".

A plaque to the south side reads "O VALIANT HEARTS, WHO TO YOUR GLORY CAME / THROUGH DUST OF CONFLICT AND THRO' BATTLE FLAME / TRANQUIL YOU LIE. YOUR KNIGHTLY VIRTUE PROVED / YOUR MEMORY HALLOWED IN THE LAND YOU LOVED", and one on the north side reads "BE THOU FAITHFUL UNTO DEATH AND I / WILL GIVE THEE A CROWN OF LIFE".

A further plaque to the rear of the memorial lists the theatres of war in which the battalions of the regiment served.

The memorial was unveiled by Field Marshal Sir Douglas Haig, who had been the Commander-in-Chief (C-in-C) of the British Expeditionary Force (BEF) on the Western Front, on 9 August 1924, five days after the tenth anniversary of the outbreak of the war.

A plaque for the Second World War was added in 1947. The original sandstone plinth weathered badly and was replaced with a similar style in granite in 1958. Another plaque was added after the regiment was disbanded in 1968. The memorial became a Category B listed building in 1988, and it was restored in 2009.

== Other memorials ==
Another Cameronians memorial in Douglas, South Lanarkshire was built in 1892 to commemorate the bicentenary of the raising of the Cameronian Regiment (26th Regiment of Foot) on 14 May 1689. It depicts the regiment's first Colonel, James Douglas, Earl of Angus. Another memorial on the Douglas Estate commemorates the disbanding of the 1st Battalion, Cameronians (Scottish Rifles) on 14 May 1968.

Clark created a similar sculpture of an advancing infantryman for his Southwark War Memorial, unveiled in 1922, with the rifle slung over his left shoulder rather than held in his right hand. A similar sculpture of an infantryman with rifle was used by Albert Toft for the Royal Fusiliers War Memorial in Holborn.

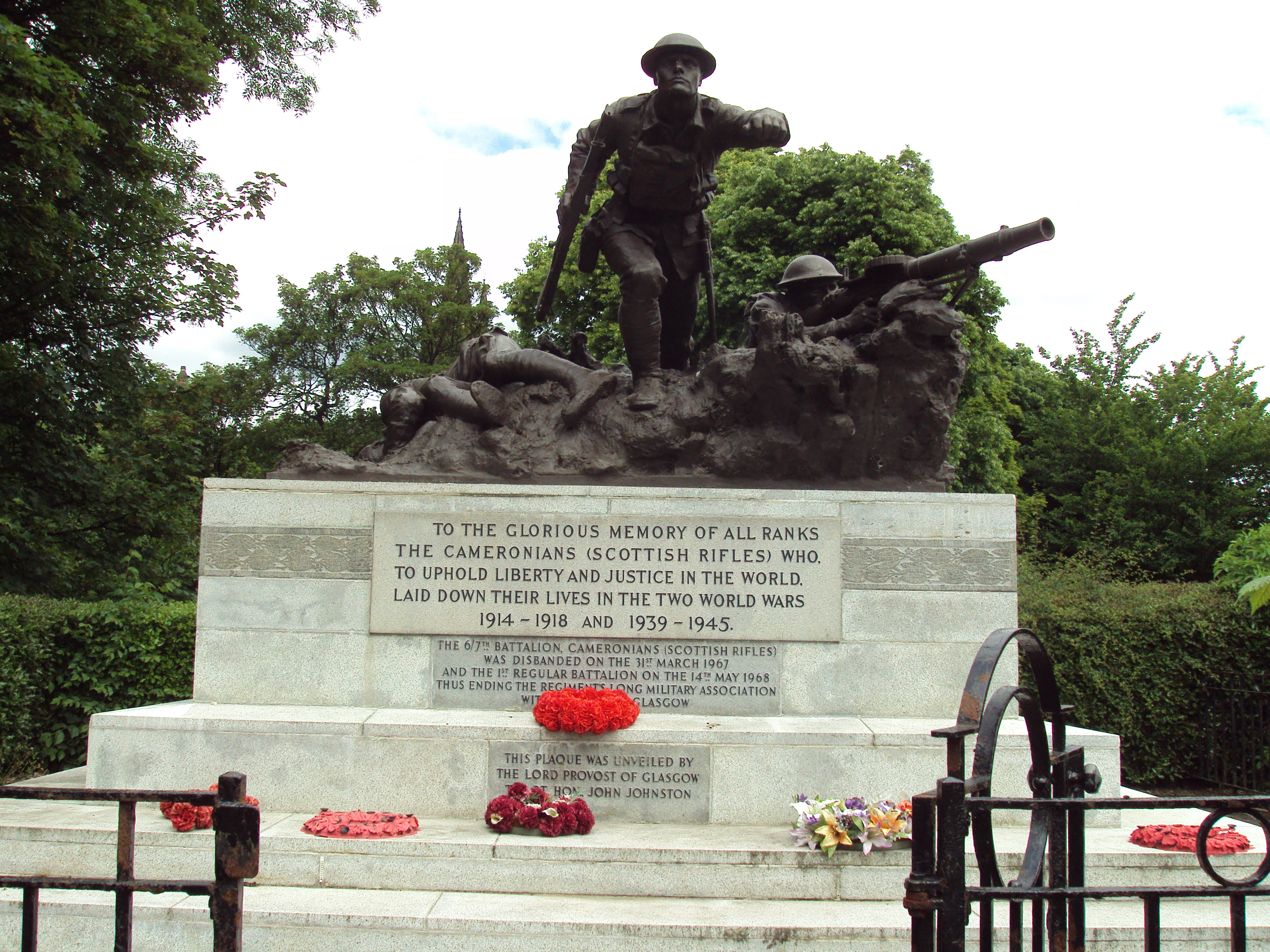

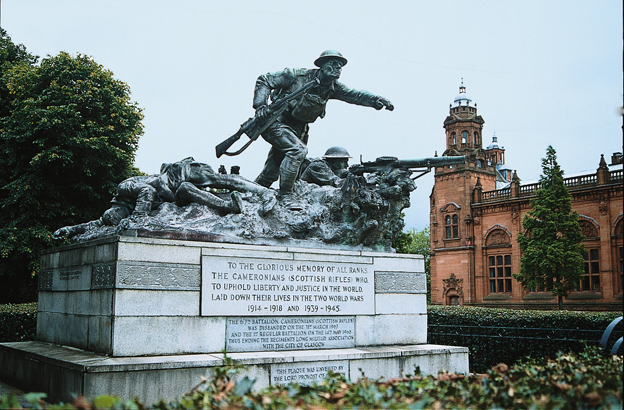
