= John Christopher Guise =

Recipient of the Victoria Cross

Lieutenant-General John Christopher Guise VC CB
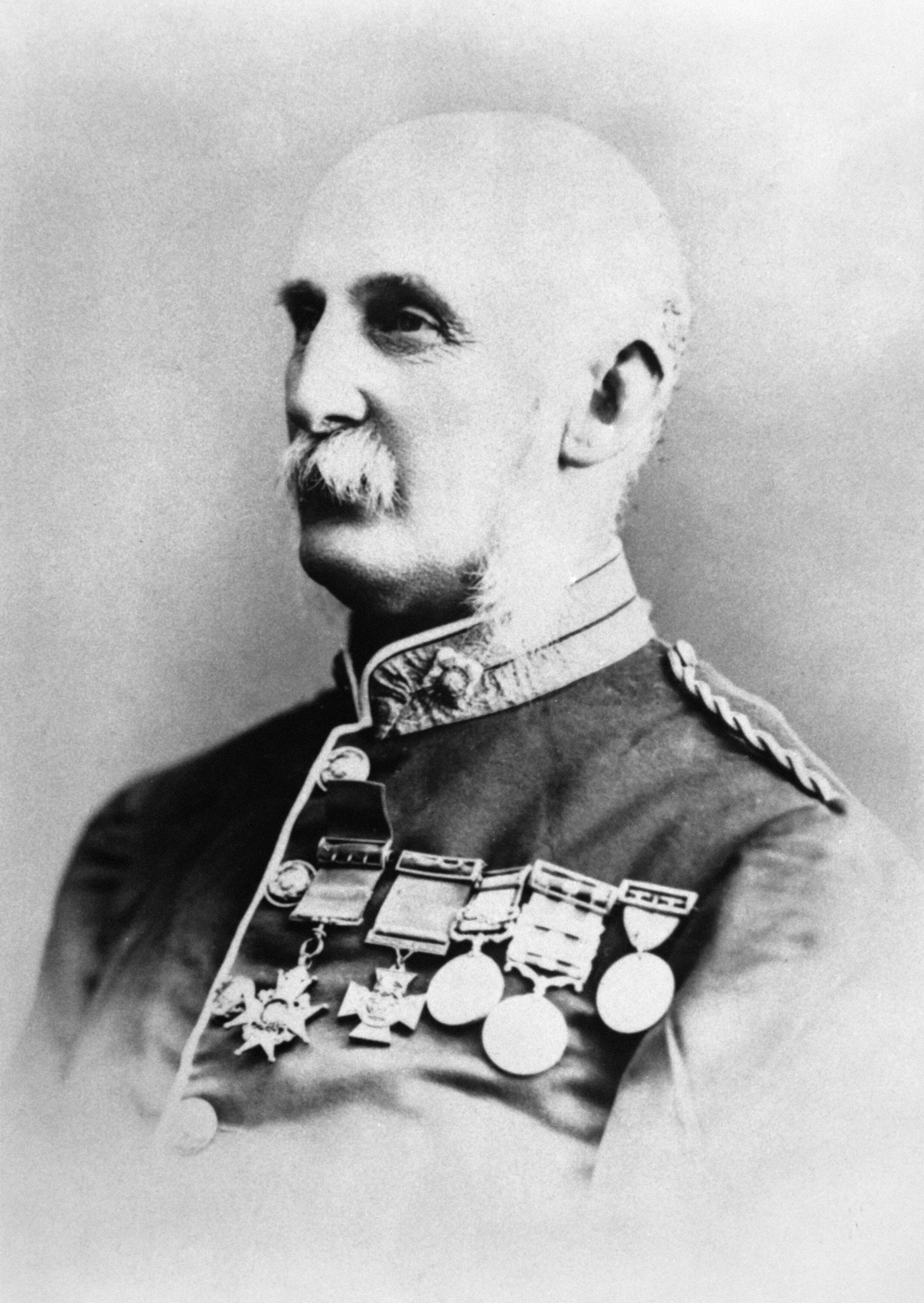
- Guise in c. 1880 (IWM Q80527)
- Born: 27 July 1826; Rhode Island, United States
- Died: 5 February 1895 (aged 68); Gorey, County Wexford
- Burial place: Gorey Churchyard
- Military career
- Allegiance: United Kingdom
- Branch: British Army
- Service years: 1845–1881
- Rank: Lieutenant-General
- Units: 90th Regiment of Foot
- Conflicts: Crimean War; Indian Mutiny
- Awards: Victoria Cross; Order of the Bath

Lieutenant-General John Christopher Guise VC CB (27 July 1826 – 5 February 1895) was a British Army officer and English recipient of the Victoria Cross, the highest and most prestigious award for gallantry in the face of the enemy that can be awarded to British and Commonwealth forces.

Guise attended Sandhurst and served in the Crimean War albeit briefly as he was forced to return home after falling ill.

During the Indian Mutiny, on 16 and 17 November 1857 at Lucknow, India, whilst a major in the 90th Regiment of Foot (later The Cameronians (Scottish Rifles)), Guise, together with sergeant (Samuel Hill), saved the life of a captain at the storming of the Secundra Bagh and also went in under heavy fire to help two wounded men. For this he was elected by the regiment to be awarded the VC. His citation reads:

90th Regiment

Major (now Brevet-Lieutenant-Colonel) John Christopher Guise
Date of Acts of Bravery, 16th and 17th November, 1857
For conspicuous gallantry in action on the 16th and 17th of November, 1857, at Lucknow.

Elected by the Officers of the Regiment.

His VC is on display in the Lord Ashcroft Gallery at the Imperial War Museum, London.

He later achieved the rank of lieutenant general and was made colonel of The Leicestershire Regiment from 1890 until his death.
