= 26th (Cameronian) Regiment of Foot =

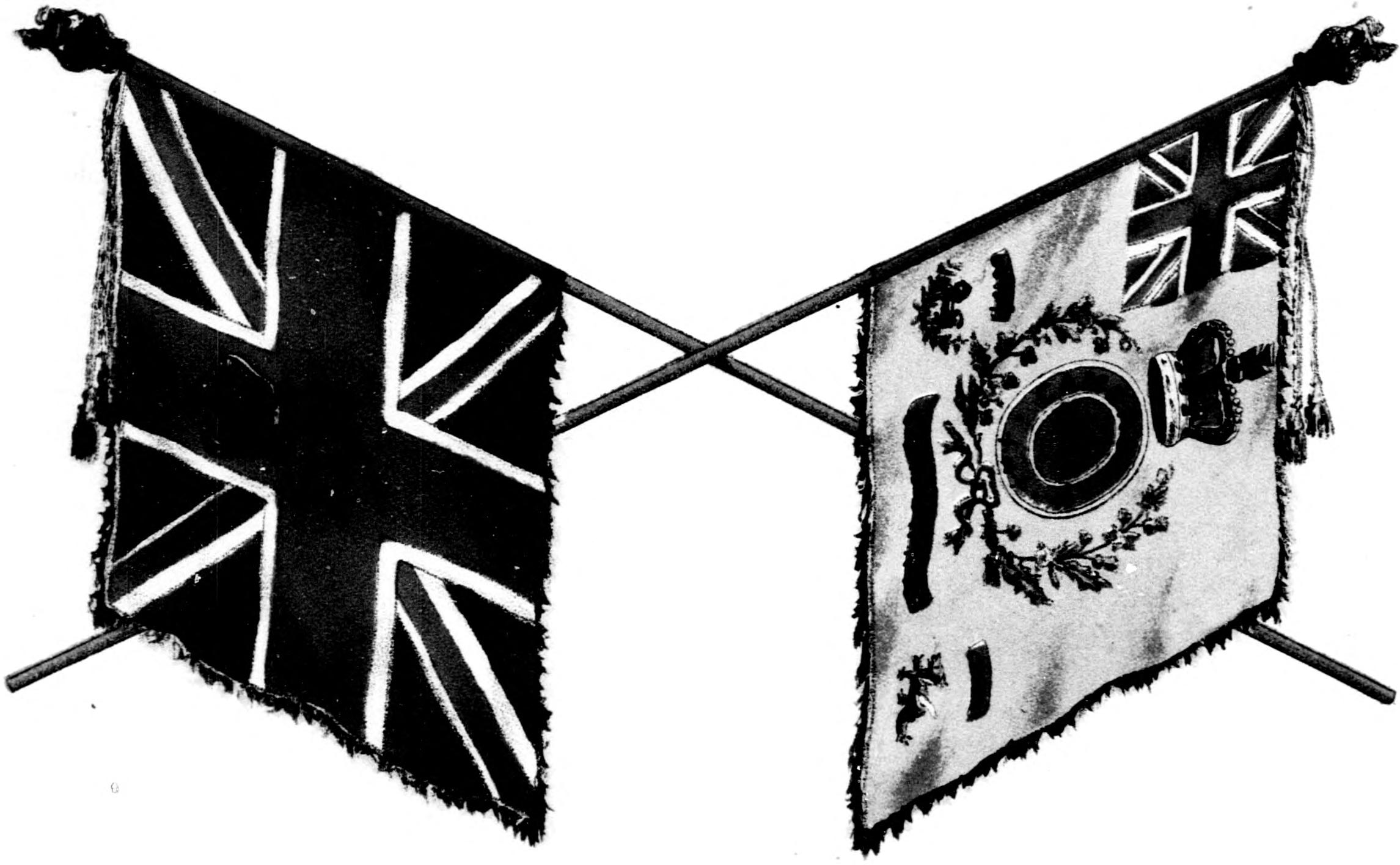
- Colours of the regiment in 1862
- Active: 1689–1881
- Country: Kingdom of Scotland (1689–1707) Kingdom of Great Britain (1707–1800) United Kingdom of Great Britain and Ireland (1801–1881)
- Branch: Army
- Type: Line Infantry
- Garrison/HQ: Hamilton Barracks, Hamilton
- March: "Within a Mile of Edinburgh Town"
- Engagements: Nine Years' War; War of the Spanish Succession; Jacobite risings American Revolutionary War; French Revolutionary Wars; Napoleonic Wars; First Opium War; Crimean War; British Expedition to Abyssinia

The 26th (Cameronian) Regiment of Foot was an infantry regiment of the Scots Army and subsequently a Scottish infantry regiment of the British Army, active from 1689 to 1881. Although the regiment took the name of its first colonel as The Earl of Angus's Regiment, it became popularly known as The Cameronians until 1751, when it was ranked as the 26th Foot. Under the Childers Reforms it amalgamated with the 90th Regiment of Foot (Perthshire Volunteers) to form the Cameronians (Scottish Rifles) in 1881. The Cameronians were themselves disbanded in 1968, meaning that no Army unit today perpetuates the lineage of the 26th Foot.

== Formation ==
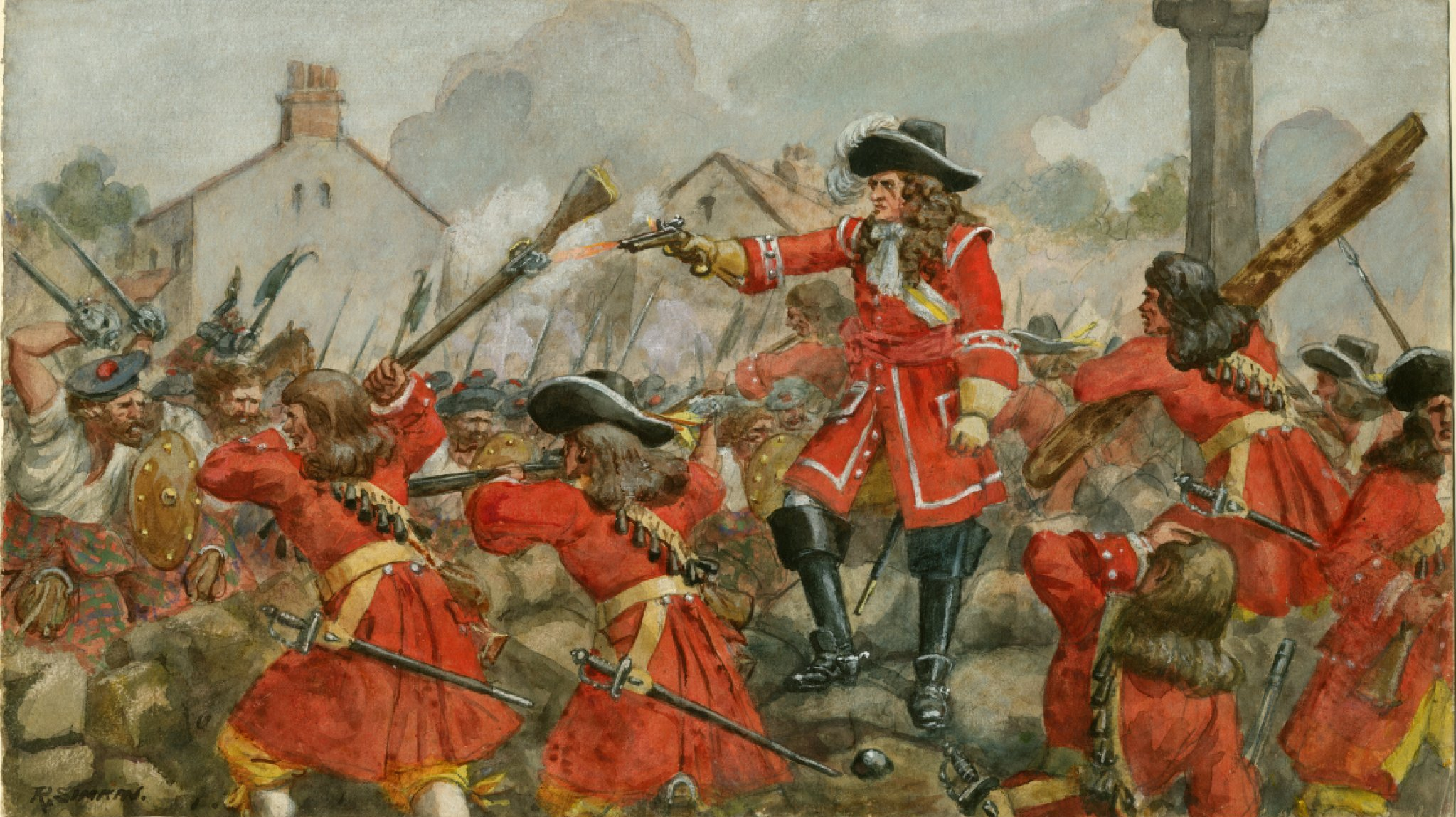
The regiment (foreground) at the Battle of Dunkeld

It was originally formed as the Cameronian Guard by the Lords of the Convention, named after the Cameronians, followers of the Presbyterian Richard Cameron, who had been a militant leader in the struggles of the Covenanters against attempts by the Stuart monarchs Charles II and James VII to outlaw Presbyterianism and impose bishops on the Church of Scotland. This conflict culminated with the Glorious Revolution leading to a Convention of the Estates of Scotland meeting on 14 March 1689. On 11 April, the day of the English coronation, the Convention finally declared that James was no longer King of Scotland, and offered the crown jointly to William and Mary.

In March 1689, three Scottish regiments in the service of William arrived in Edinburgh, and the ad hoc forces raised to protect the convention were dismissed. However, the following month, a regiment was raised near Douglas by James, Earl of Angus, drawn from among the Cameronians, and placed under the service of William III. 1,200 recruits are said to have been enlisted in a single day, without the need for "the beat of drum" (active recruiting) or any bounty money being paid. The regiment had a nominal strength of 1,200 men divided into 20 companies of 60 men each, and its unusual religious background was reflected in the regulation that each company was to have an elder, as well as the regimental chaplain being a Cameronian.

== Service under William III ==
The regiment entered government service under King William II of Scotland, III of England, in 1689, and on 21 August defeated Dundee's Jacobite forces at the Battle of Dunkeld, a turning point in Dundee's Jacobite rising of that year. The regiment also took part in the Battle of Landen in July 1693 during the Nine Years' War. After the Treaty of Ryswick was signed in September 1697, Parliament responded to political unrest over the concept of a large standing army by voting to disband all the forces raised since 1680, and to support only a minimal force of ten thousand men. William responded to this by taking a number of regiments, including the Cameronians, onto the strength of the Dutch establishment, where they would not need to be supported by Parliament. They were returned to the English establishment in 1700.

== War of the Spanish Succession ==
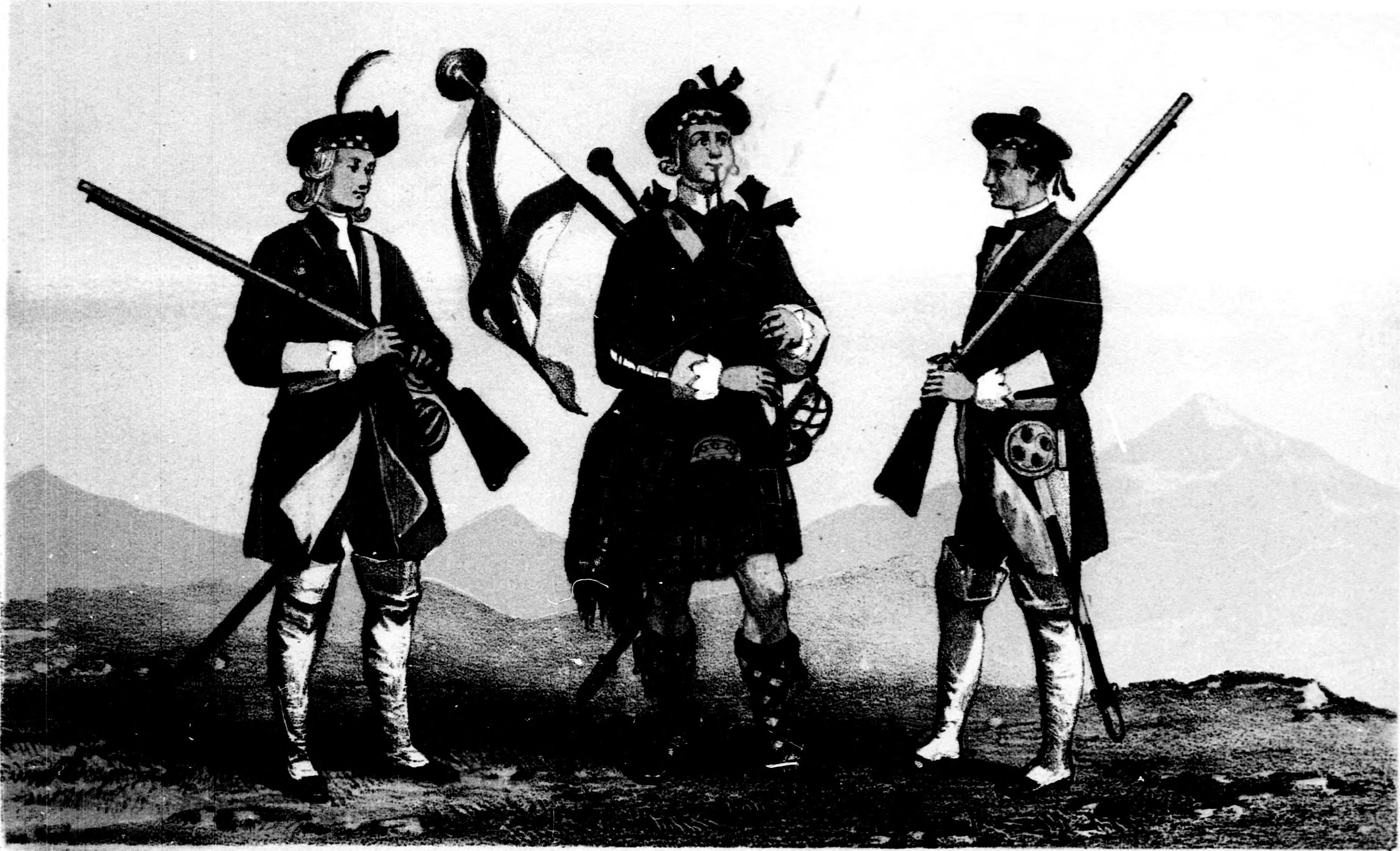
The regimental uniform in 1713

On the outbreak of the War of the Spanish Succession in 1701, an English expeditionary force of thirteen regiments was sent to the Netherlands. A second force followed in early 1702, which included the Cameronians, and both groups joined a large allied army under the command of the Duke of Marlborough, when war was declared in May. Through 1702 and 1703 the army took a number of towns by siege, though the Cameronians' participation is not recorded in any of these events; they were, however, to be fully engaged the following year. They assembled for the 1704 campaign at Bedburg in the middle of May, and in early July a detachment was part of the main British attack at the Battle of Schellenberg. Of the hundred and thirty men involved, nineteen were killed and sixty-two wounded. The regiment then fought at the Battle of Blenheim in July, where it saw additional duty the following night guarding some of the thirteen thousand men taken prisoner. The British force was withdrawn to the Netherlands in October, where it went into winter quarters.

In 1705, they fought at the Battle of Elixheim, though the rest of the year's campaign was mostly uneventful. On General Ferguson's death, the colonelcy of the regiment passed to John Borthwick, the lieutenant-colonel, in October. However, Borthwick chose to exchange his colonelcy for that of a Dutch regiment under Lord John Dalrymple, who became the regiment's colonel as of 1 January 1706. The Cameronians left winter quarters at the end of April, 1706, and during May participated in the extensive maneuvering which led to the Battle of Ramillies on the 23rd. The regiment did not take part in the main attack, but were exposed to heavy cannon fire during the battle, and took a large number of casualties. In August, the colonel – now the Earl of Stair – was appointed to command the Scots Greys, and the lieutenant-colonel, George Preston, succeeded him in the colonelcy. The regiment fought at a number of sieges during the later part of the year, including at Ath, where a party of Cameronians managed to break into the fortress walls four days before it surrendered.

The 1707 campaign was uneventful, but the regiment suffered extensively from fatigue and illness, being reduced at one point to a hundred men able to fight. In 1708 the regiment was briefly placed on notice to return to Great Britain, which was threatened with invasion, but was stood down after the French fleet was dispersed without making a landing. In July they fought at the Battle of Oudenarde, taking heavy casualties, and then served at the Siege of Lille. During the siege, they were part of a force detached to guard an ammunition convoy in late September; it was intercepted by a French force at Wijnendale, who were themselves successfully ambushed by the escorts. The French force lost six thousand killed and wounded, compared to only nine hundred of the allied force. At the very end of the year, the Cameronians were part of the force which captured Ghent, where they then remained in winter quarters.

They left Ghent in June 1709, and were part of the covering force during the siege of Tournai. When the town was captured in early September, the main army moved south; the French army encountered them just outside Mons, and they skirmished briefly with artillery fire on the 9th. In this engagement, the Cameronians took heavy losses, being in an exposed section of the battle line. The Battle of Malplaquet itself took place on the 11th, with the Cameronians in the central British infantry line. This force repeatedly beat off a French cavalry attack, and was credited by the French commander as a major element in his defeat. The regiment's losses included its lieutenant-colonel, who was shot whilst riding at the head of his men.

In the first part of 1710 the regiment was part of the force besieging Douai; they repelled a counter-attack in May with no casualties. However, they regularly took small losses in minor skirmishes, and eventually lost a total of fifty-one men killed and a hundred and ninety-two wounded in the siege. After the surrender of Douai they covered a siege at Béthune before returning to winter quarters in Ghent. They left Ghent unusually early the next year, in late March, and moved quickly into French territory to hold an advanced position before falling back in April to join the main force as it assembled. Throughout the summer they followed Marlborough through northern France, and were a part of the attacking army at the Siege of Bouchain in August, before returning to winter quarters. After some inconclusive fighting in 1712, they withdrew to garrison Dunkirk; after the Treaty of Utrecht in 1713, the fortifications here were demolished and the garrison moved to Nieuwpoort in May. They returned to Dunkirk in August, and there embarked for Ireland.

During the campaign, Blackadder recorded that the Cameronians had been thanked by Marlborough seven times for their conduct in action. The 26th was later authorised to carry the battle honours "Blenheim", "Ramillies", "Oudenarde", and "Malplaquet", for its four most prominent engagements in the war.

== Mid-eighteenth century service, 1715–1767 ==
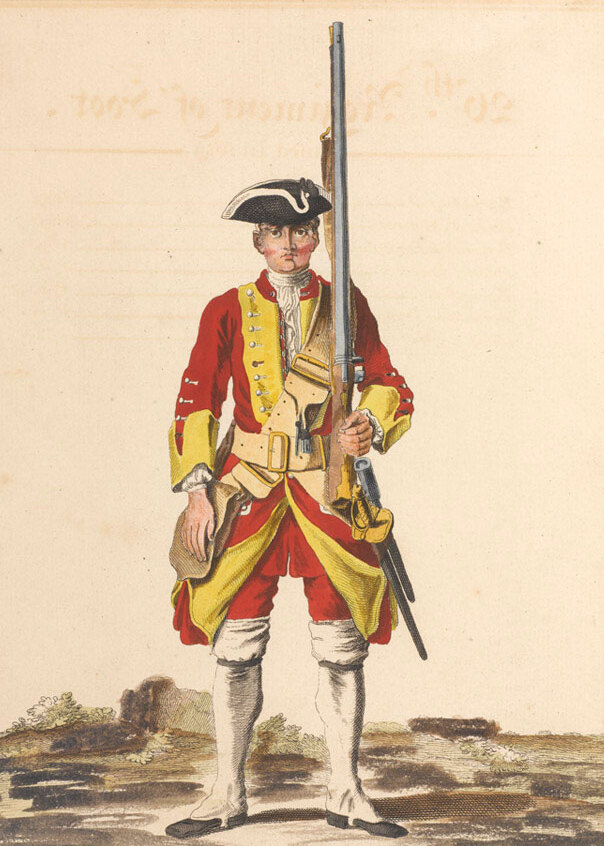
c. 1742 engraving of a regimental private

c. 1751 painting of a regimental grenadier (centre)

The Cameronians were transferred from their posting in Ireland to Scotland in late 1715, ordered there to fight against the First Jacobite rising. The regiment were moved to Preston in November 1715, along with six regiments of cavalry, where they found a strong Jacobite force in possession of the town. A frontal attack into the town on 12 November, led by the Cameronians as the only infantry force present, was beaten back with heavy losses. A further three regiments arrived the next day, and the Jacobite force, now surrounded, surrendered unconditionally. The regiment took ninety-two casualties in the Battle of Preston, including three of its senior officers, who were wounded. Following the suppression of the rebellion, the Cameronians returned to Ireland in 1716.

Philip Anstruther was promoted colonel of the regiment in May 1720. In 1726, they left Ireland to serve as marines aboard naval ships, and were then sent as reinforcements to the garrison at Gibraltar during the war with Spain in 1727. They did not see field combat during the siege of Gibraltar, as the activity on both sides was mostly a matter of long-distance bombardment rather than direct attacks; nine men were killed or died of wounds, and twenty-nine were injured. The Cameronians remained in the Gibraltar garrison until 1738, when they moved to Minorca, and left there for Ireland in 1748.

On 1 July 1751, the regiment was formally ranked as the 26th Regiment of Foot, and issued with new, standardised, regimental colours. The regiment returned to Scotland in 1754, and then moved back to Ireland in 1757, where they remained for the following decade. In 1760, Colonel Edward Sandford was appointed colonel, and replaced in 1763 by Colonel John Scott.

== North American service, 1767–1800, and the American War of Independence ==
The capture of Fort Ticonderoga, which the regiment participated in

The regiment embarked for the North American colonies in 1767, to take up garrison duties. On the outbreak of hostilities in the American War of Independence, in 1775, the 26th Foot were stationed in Lower Canada along with the 7th Royal Fusiliers; the two regiments were loosely scattered among frontier posts, and both were at a very low strength, mustering around seven hundred men between them.

On 10 May, 36 soldiers and two officers of the 26th were captured at Fort Ticonderoga by a force led by Ethan Allen and Benedict Arnold. A second detachment at Fort Crown Point was taken without incident the next day. The main force of the 7th and 26th regiments in Canada was soon shifted towards Fort Saint-Jean, in Quebec. An expedition by 150 men under Allen to capture Montreal was defeated on 25 September by thirty-six Cameronians – the entire regular garrison of the city – and a local militia force.

The Americans, under General Richard Montgomery, had meanwhile led a strong force against Saint-Jean, and began to besiege the fortress in September. The garrison, commanded by Major Charles Preston of the 26th, was made up of 550 men from the 7th and 26th. However, supplies of food and ammunition were limited, and the defenders were forced to surrender in early November. The American force moved towards Montreal, which was evacuated, with the garrison – containing a small remnant of the 26th – sailing down the St. Lawrence towards Quebec City. Slowed by adverse winds and fog, and with their passage challenged by an American artillery battery and gunboat, the ships surrendered and the troops were taken prisoner; the regimental colours were wrapped around a cannonball and dropped in the river so they would not be captured.

This effectively ended the 26th's participation in the fighting for Canada, though a few stragglers may have served with the defenders at the Battle of Quebec in December. A group of reinforcements being sent out to the regiment was landed in May 1776, with the force which lifted the siege of the city. After a large force of Americans was captured at the Battle of The Cedars, they were exchanged for prisoners from the 7th and 26th, allowing these regiments to reform in the summer.

The 26th was moved to the New York theatre in the autumn, and camped at Amboy, New Jersey throughout the winter. It made a short raid further into New Jersey, towards Newark, in September 1777, and then moved to Staten Island. The regiment participated in the attack on Fort Clinton on 6 October, along with three other regiments; the fort was taken with few casualties, but this did not lead to any lasting strategic advantage.

The regiment remained at Staten Island through the Philadelphia campaign, and in late 1779 were ordered home. The rank and file of the regiment were transferred into other units, and the regimental staff returned to England to raise a new force. On arriving in England they were sent to Staffordshire, and by the end of 1780 had a strength of two hundred men. It moved to Shrewsbury in 1781, growing to a strength of 336 men by the end of the year, and then moved to Scotland via Tynemouth. It remained in Scotland until October 1783, when it moved to Ireland.

Lieutenant-General Sir William Erskine was appointed colonel of the regiment in 1782, and petitioned the King for the right to officially change the regimental name. The traditional title of "Cameronian" had fallen into disuse at some point during the 18th century, and Erskine felt that it should be restored. Accordingly, in February 1786, the regiment was formally permitted to assume the title "Cameronian".

The regiment embarked from Cork in May 1787, with a full establishment strength of around 350 men, and arrived in British North America in August. They were garrisoned around Quebec, moving to Montreal in 1789, and then to the frontier posts along the Niagara River in 1790. It moved to St. John in 1792, and then returned to Montreal in 1794. In March 1795, Major-General Sir Charles Stuart was appointed the regimental colonel. The regiment moved back and forth between Montreal and Quebec over the following years, absorbing a large draft of men from the 4th Foot in 1797 in order to bring it up to the new strength of ten companies.

In May 1800 the regiment moved to Halifax, Nova Scotia, where it served in garrison duties for four months before sailing for England in September. On their return, however, one of the three transport ships was captured by a French privateer, the Grand Decidée, with the men paroled and allowed to return to England on the promise that they would not serve until exchanged for French prisoners. In March 1801, Lieutenant-General Andrew Gordon was appointed Colonel of the regiment.

== Egypt, 1801–1802 ==
The regiment was ordered to sail for Egypt in May 1801, to reinforce the British army fighting in the Egyptian campaign. It arrived in mid-July, joining the force under General Hely-Hutchinson, and served during the Siege of Alexandria. The regiment embarked for England in late October, with a large number of its men suffering from ophthalmia contracted in Egypt. The regiment was granted permission to carry the battle honour "Egypt" on its colours, along with an image of the Sphinx, and twenty-five of its officers were awarded gold medals by Sultan Selim III.

The regiment returned to England in February 1802, about a month before the Treaty of Amiens was signed, ending the war with France. On their arrival, a large number of men were discharged due to incapacity or due to their terms of service having expired, and after some ineffective recruiting attempts moved to Scotland in November. However, the recruiting here was equally limited, with the regiment having to send recruiting parties as far afield as Ireland for men.

== Napoleonic Wars ==
When hostilities resumed with France in May 1803, the Cameronians were based at Fort George, in the Highlands of Scotland. They were brought south to Stirling at the end of July, where they were heavily reinforced from men who had been recruited under the Army of Reserve Act. Over thirteen hundred new men were enlisted, and the regiment was able to raise a second battalion, both having about equal proportions of new and old recruits.

The first battalion moved to Ulster in December, with the second following later in the month. In August 1804 they both moved to the Curragh, where they took part in large-scale maneuvers for two months before returning to winter quarters. In December the battalions were reorganised, with the first battalion taking all the men on regular enlistments – who were liable for foreign service – and any reserve men who had volunteered to be sent overseas, and transferring all the reserve men who were only liable for home service to the second battalion. This left the first battalion with six hundred men, whilst the second battalion had almost twice that strength.

The regiment moved to Germany in 1805 as part of the Hanover Expedition, then returned to home service. It then was shipped to Spain in October 1808 for service in the Peninsular War, where it fought at the Battle of Corunna in January 1809, and then moved to the Netherlands for the Walcheren Campaign. It returned to the Peninsula in June 1811 but, following much sickness in the ranks, then took up garrison duties in Gibraltar until the end of the war. A second battalion was raised in 1804, and served in the United Kingdom. It was disbanded in Scotland in 1813, having not seen active service.

== Irish service, 1822–1827 ==
The Cameronians were originally ordered to return from Gibraltar in May 1821, but this order was countermanded, and it was not until November 1822 that the regiment was finally transferred to its new posting in Fermoy, County Cork, moving into Cork proper in April 1823. Here, they garrisoned the city, and patrolled the local roads at night. However, the regiment's discipline suffered heavily from the move; in Gibraltar, they had had little interaction with the Spanish-speaking local population, whilst here they could freely socialise in the town. As a result, the rate of drunkenness, and associated minor infractions, increased sharply.

In January 1824 the regiment moved to Kinsale, with detachments in a number of scattered outposts, and then in October to Tralee, again the central point of a number of smaller garrisons. It was expanded from eight to ten companies in March 1825, moving to scattered stations around Naas, County Kildare, in October.

In 1826 the regiment was ordered to embark for England at short notice in response to extensive rioting in Lancashire, though they returned to Ireland shortly afterwards and took up a garrison posting in the Royal Barracks, Dublin. Their time in Kildare, and to a greater degree in Dublin, was marked by a sharp increase in the rate of desertion; forty-two men deserted in 1826–27, as against thirty-seven in the previous eight years. The regiment moved to Richmond Barracks in January 1827, and in July left Dublin for various postings around Waterford. They were ordered to England late in the year to prepare for colonial service, arriving in Chatham in November, where older men were discharged.

== India, 1828–1840 ==
The 26th was not embarked for India until May 1828, arriving in Fort St. George, Madras, in September; this was the first time the regiment had seen service in India. It took on a draft of men from the 30th Regiment of Foot in November, and settled into a peaceful and mostly healthy period as part of the city's garrison.

The regiment was ordered to Calcutta in July 1830, though plans were made for some months to send them to Bangalore instead. On their arrival they moved north to Chinsurah, and were then ordered to march to Karnal, in north-western India. They departed Chinsurah in December, having lost thirteen men there to cholera, and after a long and complicated march arrived at Meerut at the end of March, 1831. They had marched nine hundred miles over eighty days, some days making less than three miles. The subsequent years were again passed in quiet garrison duties, losing around twenty men a year to disease.

On 21 August 1834, the regiment was ordered to prepare for active service immediately, as a result of a dispute with a local prince, and after some delays marched for Marwar on 1 October. However, it was halted ten days later by the news that the Rajah of Jodhpur had reached a peaceful agreement with the British and that troops were no longer needed.

At the start of 1836 the regiment was relieved at Meerut by the 3rd Buffs, and moved south-east to Ghazipur. It remained here less than a year, ordered to proceed to Calcutta at the beginning of December. This march proved much easier than the opposite journey six years previously, and the regiment arrived at Fort William in good order on 17 January 1838. It remained there in garrison through 1838 and 1839, but in 1840 received orders to prepare for overseas service.

== China, 1840–1842 ==
The regiment embarked at Calcutta on 24 March 1840 with a strength of nine hundred men, bound for Singapore, where it would rendezvous with an expeditionary force being prepared for service in China. The force arrived off Zhoushan on 4 July, capturing it with little resistance the following day. The 26th was camped on a hill just inside the city, where heavy work, bad terrain and bad provisions soon caused illness to set in. The regiment moved into the city proper in September, by which time four hundred men were sick, and in October and November around eighty men died each month. Two hundred and sixty men were evacuated to Manila in November, and by the end of the year two hundred and forty men had died, with a hundred and sixty-three sick in Zhoushan and a mere hundred and ten able-bodied men.

All available able-bodied men were moved north to support the attack on the Bogue forts, which fell on 7 January 1841 in the Second Battle of Chuenpi. After an abortive attempt at a treaty agreement had fallen through, the regiment participated in the second attack to capture them on 26 February in the Battle of the Bogue. The force slowly moved up-river, taking Canton on 24 May and with the 26th beating off a Chinese counter-attack on 30 May, before withdrawing to Hong Kong after another provisional treaty was signed. Whilst resting at Hong Kong, the 26th made an expedition against Amoy in August, before being moved up the coast to Ningbo at the end of December aboard HMS Jupiter, equipped with newly modified percussion muskets.

They arrived at Ningbo on 7 February 1842, and took up garrison there. The town was attacked on the night of 9–10 March, though the 26th were not involved in the defence, and a few days later participated in an expedition to attack two fortified camps nearby. In early May Ningbo was evacuated, and the 26th moved northwards again to support an attack on Zhapu. Here, the 26th saw heavy fighting, with three men killed before the town was taken.

The regiment then moved with the main force up the Yangtze towards Shanghai and Nanjing, with the 26th part of the force which stormed Zhenjiang on 21 July. They disembarked outside Nanking on 11 August, remaining there whilst the Treaty of Nanking was signed, and then withdrew, reaching Hong Kong on 30 October. The regiment was granted permission to carry the battle honour "China" on its colours, along with an image of a dragon, as a result of its services during this expedition.

== Home service, 1843–1850 ==
The regiment sailed from Hong Kong on 20 December, and on its arrival at Singapore on New Year's Eve was informed that it was being sent to England rather than returning to its station in Bengal. It did, however, continue its voyage to Calcutta, where it waited a few weeks before sailing for England in late February 1843, with a full strength of over a thousand men, forty-four of whom died of disease en route. Approximately 24 sick were left behind in Calcutta Hospital. Part-way to England, it had the unusual distinction of being the first British Army unit to formally visit Napoleon's tomb on Saint Helena, when one of the ships carrying the regimental headquarters called there. Through July and August the regiment took on garrison duties in the south-east of England as it reassembled after the voyage, and then moved north in September to Edinburgh Castle, where it was to be posted.

The regiment suffered problems with discipline over the winter, partly due to being in Scotland – where the men could easily slip away – and partly from the Chinese expedition, where many of the older and more responsible non-commissioned officers had died or been invalided out of the service, and as a result of which most of the men had large amounts of ready cash in back pay. However, by the spring of 1844, matters had mostly settled down, and the regiment turned out in good order to receive a new set of colours on 3 May, at Bruntsfield Links. They were presented in a formal ceremony by Lady Douglas, the wife of Sir Neil Douglas, commander of the forces in Scotland and governor of Edinburgh Castle. A detachment was sent to Dundee two weeks later, due to local unrest, but returned home without needing to be deployed; this was the only active duty the regiment saw on its posting in Scotland. It was ordered to leave the city in August, transferring to northern England.

It moved to various positions around Newcastle upon Tyne, where it spent the winter, and then proceeded to Manchester in April 1845. The regiment was still understrength after the Chinese expedition, and as the recruiting in Scotland had been mixed, a large number of "very inferior" men were brought in shortly after the move to Manchester. In June it moved to Belfast, where it stayed through the winter, and in April 1846 it moved to Enniskillen. After Eniskillen the 26th moved south, marching to Dublin in August. Here, it remained through the winter, moving to Buttevant, County Cork, in August. and then to Cork itself in April 1848. As was by now inevitable for Irish postings, most of the regiment was posted by companies to towns some distance from the headquarters, with these detachments changing location frequently. The regiment was finally brought together again in June 1849.

In August of that year, two companies of the Cameronians provided a guard of honour for Queen Victoria, who had arrived in Cork. This was the regiment's last major activity in Ireland, and they were ordered to prepare for foreign service in December. The regiment organised itself as a depot of four companies and a service battalion of six companies, which sailed for Gibraltar in March 1850, and took up garrison there. The depot remained in Ireland until May, when it moved to Jersey.

== Colonial service, 1850s–1880s ==
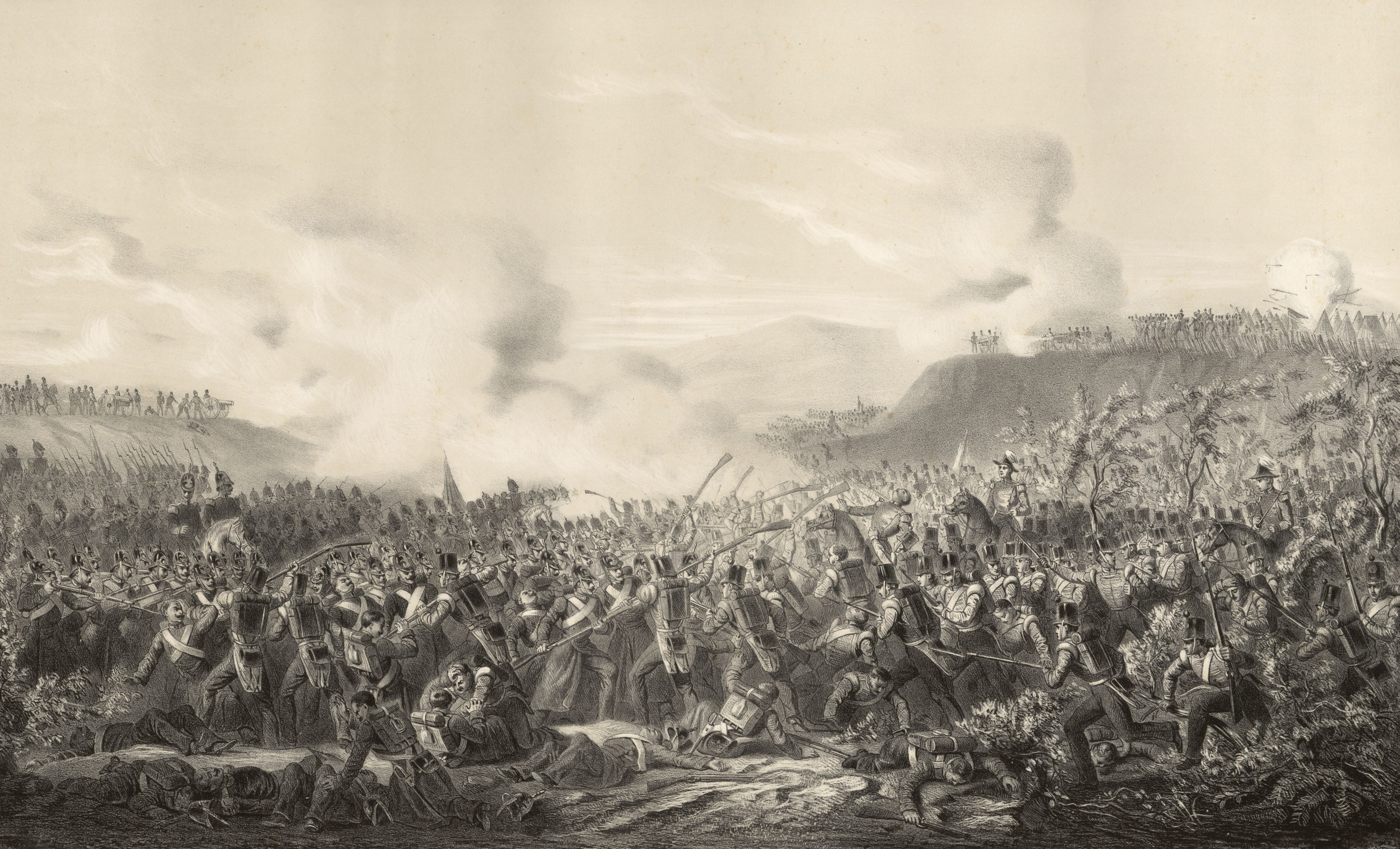
The regiment (right) performing a bayonet charge at Russian troops during the Battle of Inkerman

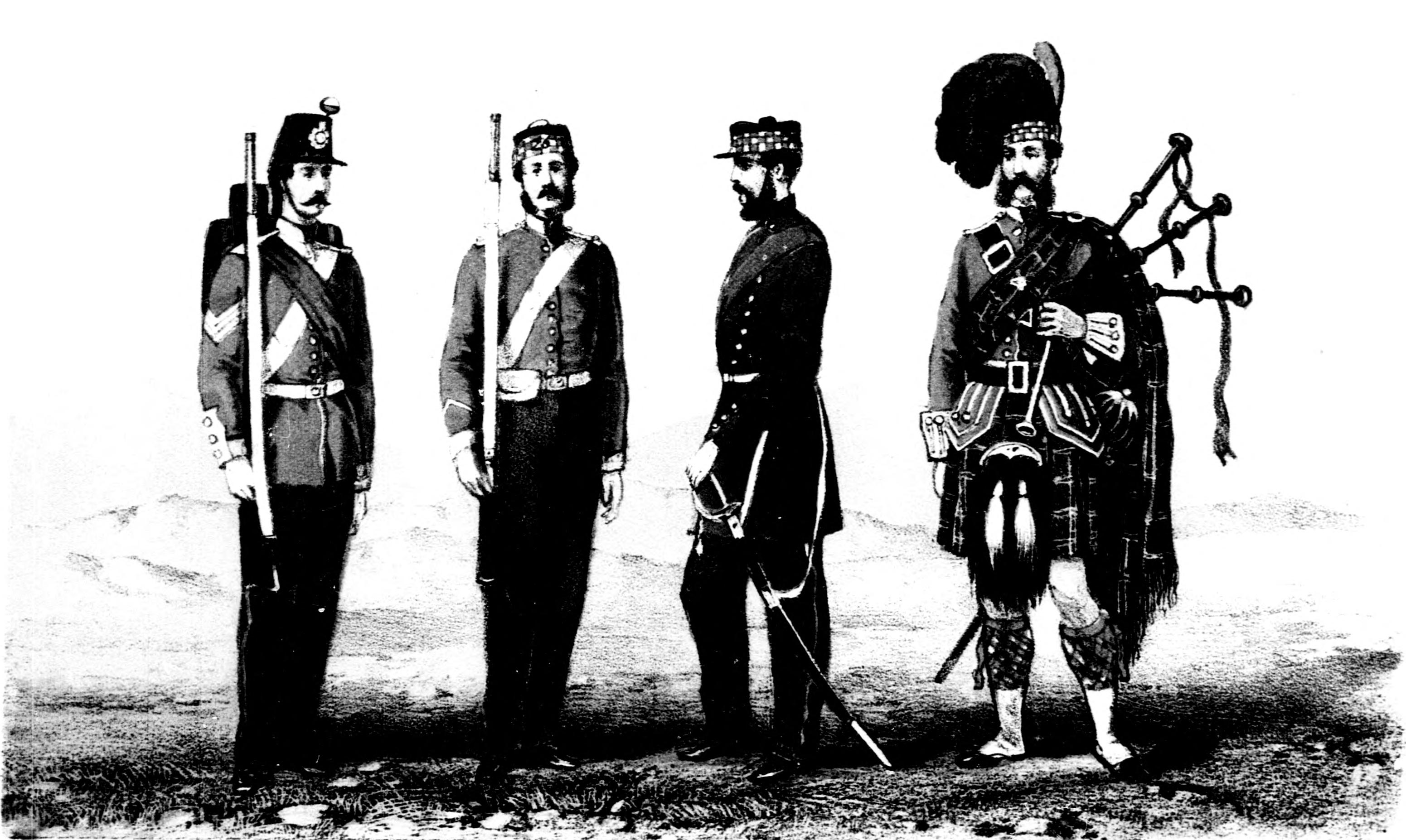
The regimental uniform in 1866

The depot left Jersey in May 1851, and moved to a base in Monmouthshire. In November 1852, the regiment was alerted that it would be transferred to the West Indies, but this was suspended in early 1853 due to concerns about the health of troops stationed there, and the regiment was ordered to Canada instead. The day that they arrived in Montreal, 9 June, a detachment of the regiment was ordered to assist the local police in keeping the peace when Alessandro Gavazzi, a well-known anti-Catholic preacher, was giving a lecture at a local church. A mob stormed the police line and broke into the church; the soldiers arrived as the mob retreated, and tried to form a line between the two groups. However, the rioters began to push through, someone shouted to fire, and shots broke out. Most soldiers fired into the air, and the shooting was immediately stopped by an officer's signal, but several people were killed. This event further inflamed the situation, and the regiment had to be deployed throughout the night to patrol the streets. In all, the initial shots and the later rioting killed and wounded about forty people. The regiment left Montreal in July, and sailed from Quebec to Bermuda in November, where they relieved the 56th Foot.

Major-General Sir Philip Bainbrigge was appointed colonel of the regiment in March 1854. The regiment took on an extra two companies from the depot in April 1855, all untrained men; most of the experienced soldiers at the depot had volunteered for service with other regiments in the Crimean War. In 1856 they received the new Enfield rifled musket, which necessitated an expanded program of training for both experienced and new men.

The regiment was relieved at Bermuda in October 1859, and sailed for Ireland. It remained there for a year, with little of event happening, before moving to Edinburgh in 1861. It received a new set of colours in April 1862, presented in the Queen's Park, and moved to Aldershot the following month. That year, Major-General Sir George Henry MacKinnon was appointed colonel of the regiment.

The regiment shipped to Bombay in July 1865, and then moved to Belgaum. They did not see active service in India, but in late 1867 it was ordered to prepare for service as part of an expeditionary force sent to Abyssinia. The Cameronians were part of the follow-up echelon of the force, and landed on 31 March 1868, equipped with the new Snider-Enfield rifle. They marched inland towards Magdala, halting after a few days', and after a month of waiting received notice that hostilities had ended. The regiment fell back to the coast, boarded ships for Bombay, and arrived there on 11 June. They received the battle honour "Abyssinia" for this operation, which had been completed without taking any casualties or engaging an enemy force.

On arriving in Bombay the regiment was diverted to Calcutta, where it was garrisoned at Dum Dum. They moved back into the city proper at the end of the year, and then in early 1870 were transferred to Faizabad. Here, they suffered an outbreak of cholera, with thirty-four deaths among the men and their families. The 26th did, however, gain the distinction of being ranked as the best regiment in the Indian forces for rifle-shooting, and the second-best in the British Army as a whole. At the end of 1872 they moved to Morar, Gwailor, where they continued their run of musketry successes; the 26th was ranked third in 1873 and first in the whole army in 1874.

The regiment returned home in 1875, stationed at the Clarence Barracks at Portsmouth, where it received the new breech-loading Martini-Henry rifle. After adapting to the new style of firearm, the Cameronians regained their Indian standards of target shooting, and were ranked third in the Army in 1876. In August 1876 the 26th was shipped to Glasgow, where it moved into the Gallowgate Barracks.

During a diplomatic crisis in early 1878 the regiment was mobilised for overseas service, and received several hundred reservists and volunteers transferred from other regiments to bring it up to full strength. However, it was stood down in July, after the Congress of Berlin had averted the danger of war.

It moved to Aldershot in October of that year, where it took part in large-scale exercises, and them embarked for Malta in August 1880. In 1881 the Maltese garrison was ordered to South Africa as reinforcements following the British defeat at the Battle of Majuba Hill in the First Boer War, but by the time their ships reached Gibraltar it was announced that the war had ended. The 26th changed direction, and arrived in Portsmouth in April, moving to garrison in Shorncliffe Army Camp.

== Amalgamation and successors ==
As part of the Cardwell Reforms of the 1870s, where single-battalion regiments were linked together to share a single depot and recruiting district in the United Kingdom, the 26th was linked with the 74th (Highland) Regiment, and assigned to district no. 59 at Hamilton Barracks in Hamilton.

Under the Childers Reforms of the early 1880s, however, the depot system was altered and expanded to form "territorial" two battalion regiments. The four regiments brigaded at Hamilton were re-organised, and the 26th was now linked with the 90th Regiment of Foot (Perthshire Volunteers). The two were formally amalgamated in 1882, to form the Scotch Rifles Cameronians. This somewhat ungainly name was quickly altered to the Cameronians (Scotch Rifles), and then to the more modern form of the Cameronians (Scottish Rifles). The Cameronians, as the more senior regiment, formed the 1st Battalion; the 90th, as the junior, formed the 2nd.

The 26th paraded as a separate regiment for the last time on 26 June 1882, wearing a new green uniform – green was traditionally worn by rifle regiments, unlike the scarlet of line regiments. Its colours were put in store – rifle regiments, again, traditionally did not carry colours – and formally deposited in Glasgow Cathedral in 1885.

== Traditions ==
Because of its origins in a religious movement, the regiment issued bibles to all of its new soldiers as part of their kit, a tradition that continued after amalgamation. Also, The Cameronians (Scottish Rifles) were the only regiment in the British Army that carried their weapons into church. This was a tradition that started in the Covenanter days when the Covenanters posted armed pickets at the beginning of worship services to keep a lookout for foes. The Cameronians continued this practice even after being taken into British service. They would post double sentries at the four corners of the church. The tradition continued until the regiment disbanded.

The regiment was authorised to wear deep yellow facings on its uniforms under the 1751 uniform standardisation, though the regiment is mentioned as originally having white facings in 1691, shortly after its formation. They also wore a tartan, or Scotch plaid, forage cap rather than a plain uniform one, at least during the 19th century. Whilst the 26th was not formally a Highland regiment, it did maintain a small group of men to serve as pipers, which are recorded at least as far back as the 1820s.

The regiment carried on its colours the battle honours "Corunna" and "Abyssinia", as well as a Sphinx badge superscribed "Egypt" and a dragon badge superscribed "China". The battle honours "Blenheim", "Ramillies", "Oudenarde", and "Malplaquet" were also granted to the 26th, but not until 1882; as such, they were only ever borne by its successor, the Cameronians (Scottish Rifles).

== Victoria Crosses ==
Victoria Crosses awarded to members of the regiment were:

- Private Edmund John Fowler, Zulu War (28 March 1879). Whilst serving with 90th Perthshire Light Infantry.
- Lieutenant Henry Lysons, Zulu War (28 March 1879). Whilst Serving with 90th Perthshire Light Infantry.

== Battle honours ==
The regiment's battle honours were as follows:

- War of the Spanish Succession: Blenheim; Ramillies; Oudenarde; Malplaquet;
- Napoleonic Wars: Egypt; Corunna;
- Later wars: China; Abyssinia

== Regimental colonels ==
Colonels of the Regiment were:

- 1689–1692: Col. James Douglas, Earl of Angus
- 1692–1693: Col. Andrew Monro
- 1693–1705: Maj-Gen. James Ferguson
- 1705–1706: Col. William Borthwick of Johnstoneburn
- 1706: F.M. John Dalrymple, 2nd Earl of Stair (Lord Dalrymple), KT
- 1706–1720: Lt-Gen. George Preston
- 1720–1760: Lt-Gen. Philip Anstruther

26th Regiment of Foot (1751)

- 1760–1763: Lt-Gen. Edward Sandford
- 1763–1775: Maj-Gen. John Scott
- 1775–1782: Gen. Lord Adam Gordon
- 1782–1795: Lt-Gen. Sir William Erskine of Torrie, Bt.

26th (The Cameronian) Regiment of Foot – (1786)

- 1795–1801: Lt-Gen. Hon. Sir Charles Stuart, KB
- 1801–1806: Lt. Gen. Andrew Gordon [also 59th Foot, 89th Foot]
- 1806–1813: Lt-Gen. John Elphinstone, 12th Lord Elphinstone
- 1813–1838: Gen. George Ramsay, 9th Earl of Dalhousie, GCB
- 1838–1854: F.M. Sir John Colborne, 1st Baron Seaton, GCB, GCMG, GCH
- 1854–1862: Gen. Sir Philip Bainbrigge, KCB
- 1862–1881: Gen. George Henry Mackinnon, CB

== Bibliography ==
- Baker, Anthony (1986). Battle Honours of the British and Commonwealth Armies. Littlehampton Book Services. ISBN 0-7110-1600-3.
- Carter, Thomas (1867). Historical Record of the Twenty-Sixth, or Cameronian Regiment. London: W.O. Mitchell.
- Harris, Tim (2006). Revolution: The Great Crisis of the British Monarchy, 1685–1720. Penguin Books, Ltd. ISBN 0-7139-9759-1.
- Johnston, S. H. F. (1957). The history of the Cameronians (Scottish Rifles) : 26th and 90th : vol. I, 1689–1910. Aldershot: Gale & Polden.
- Norman, C.B. (1911). Battle honours of the British army : from Tangier, 1662, to the commencement of the reign of King Edward VII. London: Murray.
