= 90th Regiment of Foot (Perthshire Volunteers) =

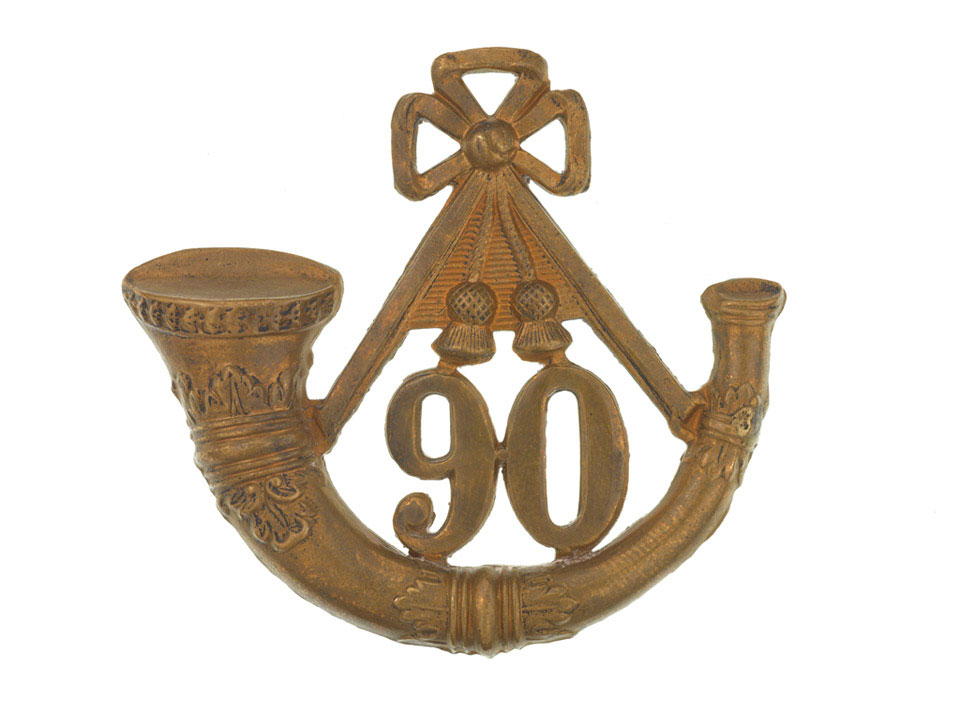
- 1874–1881 regimental glengarry badge
- Active: 1794–1881
- Country: Great Britain (1794–1800); United Kingdom (1801–1881)
- Branch: British Army
- Type: Infantry
- Role: Light infantry
- Size: One battalion (1795–1804, 1817–1881); Two battalions (1794–1795, 1804–1817)
- Garrison/HQ: Hamilton Barracks, Hamilton
- Nickname: "Perthshire Grey-breeks"
- Colours: Buff facings
- Engagements: French Revolutionary and Napoleonic Wars; Crimean War; Indian Rebellion of 1857; Xhosa Wars; Anglo-Zulu War

Commanders
- Notable commanders: Thomas Graham, Lord Lynedoch

The 90th Regiment of Foot (Perthshire Volunteers) was a light infantry regiment of the British Army. Raised in 1794, under the Childers Reforms it was amalgamated with the 26th (Cameronian) Regiment of Foot to form the Cameronians (Scottish Rifles) in 1881.

== History ==
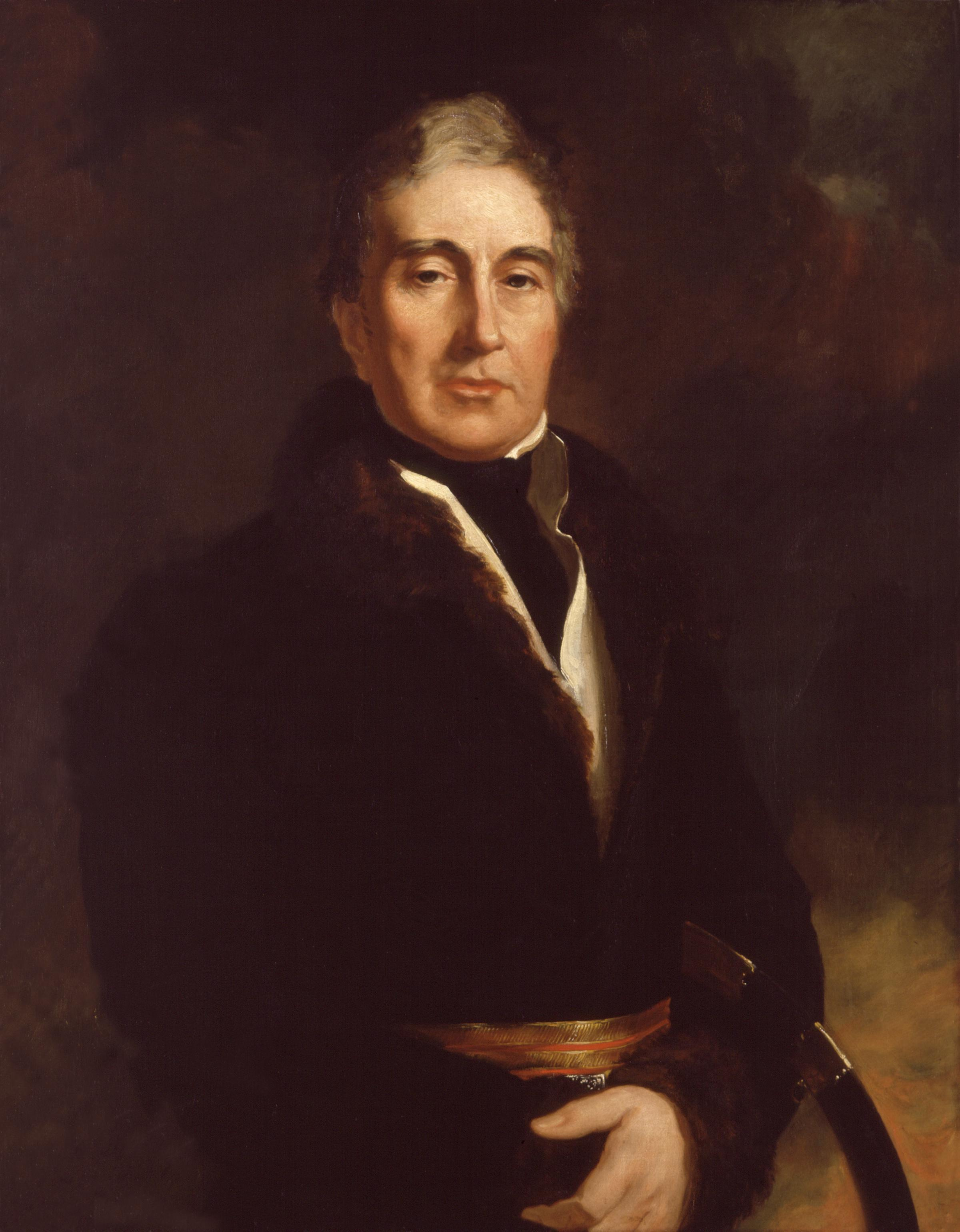
Thomas Graham, the regiment's founder

=== Formation ===
The regiment (right) at the Battle of Mandora

The regiment was raised in Scotland by Thomas Graham as the 90th Regiment of Foot, in response to the threat posed by the French Revolution, on 10 February 1794. Graham was given permission to uniform and drill his regiment as a light infantry battalion. When raised, the regiment's nickname was the "Perthshire Grey-breeks" due to the colour of their netherwear at the time. The regiment had scarlet coats with buff facings until 1881 when the regiment became rifles. It embarked as part of the Quiberon Expedition and took part in the capture of the Île d'Yeu in September 1795. The following year the regiment was dispatched to support the French Royalist Lieutenant-general François de Charette in his struggle with the Republicans. It took part in the Capture of Minorca in November 1798 and then sailed for Malta in November 1800 before transferring to Egypt in March 1801 for service in the Egyptian Campaign. It saw action at the Battle of Abukir on 8 March 1801 and the Battle of Mandora on 13 March 1801 before returning to Malta in September 1801 and sailing for England in February 1802.

=== Napoleonic Wars ===
The regiment became the 90th Regiment of Foot (Perthshire Volunteers) on absorbing the Perthshire Volunteers in 1802. A second battalion was raised in September 1804 but never left the United Kingdom. The 1st Battalion embarked for the West Indies in January 1805 and was garrisoned on Saint Vincent. It saw action at the invasion of Martinique in January 1809 and at the invasion of Guadeloupe in January 1810. The battalion then sailed for Canada in May 1814 and was garrisoned in Quebec during the War of 1812. The regiment became the 90th Regiment of Foot (Perthshire Volunteers) (Light Infantry) in May 1815. The 1st Battalion arrived for Ostend in August 1815 for service as part of the Army of Occupation of France. It absorbed the 2nd Battalion in 1817.

=== Victorian era ===
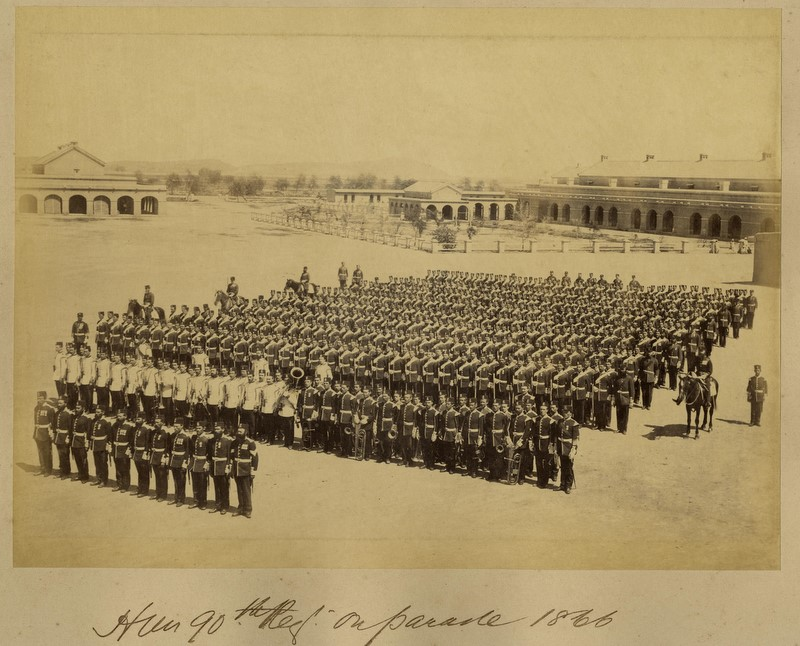
Regimental troops on parade in India, 1866

The regiment sailed for Malta in October 1820 and then on to the Ionian Islands in October 1821 before returning home in 1830. It then embarked for Ceylon in October 1835 and, after ten years on the island, sailed on to the Cape of Good Hope where it landed in April 1846 for service in the Seventh Xhosa War. It embarked for England in January 1847. It sailed to Balaklava in December 1854 and saw action at the Siege of Sevastopol in winter 1854. The regiment returned to England in June 1856 but then embarked for India in February 1857 to help suppress the Indian Rebellion. It took part in the relief of Lucknow in November 1857, an action which saw members of the regiment awarded six Victoria Crosses. The regiment embarked for home in September 1869.

The regiment embarked on the Nubian with the war correspondent Melton Prior for the Cape Colony in January 1878 and fought in the Ninth Xhosa War later that year. It also saw action at the Battle of Kambula in March 1879 and the Battle of Ulundi in July 1879 during the Anglo-Zulu War. The regiment embarked for India again in October 1879.

As part of the Cardwell Reforms of the 1870s, where single-battalion regiments were linked together to share a single depot and recruiting district in the United Kingdom, the 90th was linked with the 73rd (Perthshire) Regiment of Foot, and assigned to district no. 60 at Hamilton Barracks. On 1 July 1881 the Childers Reforms came into effect and the regiment amalgamated with the 26th (Cameronian) Regiment of Foot to form the Cameronians (Scottish Rifles).

== Battle honours ==
Battle honours won by the regiment were:

- Napoleonic Wars: Mandora, Egypt, Martinique 1809, Guadeloupe 1810
- Crimean War: Sevastopol
- Indian Mutiny: Lucknow
- South Africa 1846–72, South Africa 1877-79 (awarded to Cameronian regiment in 1882)

== Victoria Crosses ==
Victoria Crosses awarded to members of the regiment were:

- Private John Alexander, Crimean War (18 June 1855)
- Sergeant Andrew Moynihan, Crimean War (8 September 1855)
- Lieutenant William Rennie, Indian Mutiny (21 September 1857) and (25 September 1857)
- Surgeon Anthony Dickson Home, Indian Mutiny (26 September 1857)
- Assistant surgeon William Bradshaw, Indian Mutiny (26 September 1857)
- Major John Christopher Guise, Indian Mutiny (16 November 1857)
- Sergeant Samuel Hill, Indian Mutiny (16 November 1857)
- Private Patrick Graham, Indian Mutiny (17 November 1857)
- Private Edmund Fowler, Anglo-Zulu War (28 March 1879)
- Lieutenant Henry Lysons, Anglo-Zulu War (28 March 1879)

== Colonels of the Regiment ==
Colonels of the Regiment were:

=== 90th Regiment of Foot ===
- 1794–1823: Gen. Thomas Graham, 1st Baron Lynedoch, GCB, GCMG

=== 90th Regiment of Foot (Perthshire Volunteers) (Light Infantry) - (1815) ===
- 1823: Gen. Hon Robert Meade
- 1823–1837: Gen. Sir Ralph Darling, GCH
- 1837–1841: Lt-Gen. Sir Henry Sheehy Keating, KCB
- 1841–1853: Gen. Sir Alexander Leith, KCB
- 1853–1857: Lt-Gen. Felix Calvert
- 1857–1862: Gen. Alexander Fisher Macintosh, KH
- 1862: Gen. George Upton, 3rd Viscount Templetown, GCB
- 1862–1881: Gen. William Hassell Eden
- 1881: Regiment amalgamated with the 26th (Cameronian) Regiment of Foot to form the Cameronians (Scottish Rifles)

== Commemorations ==
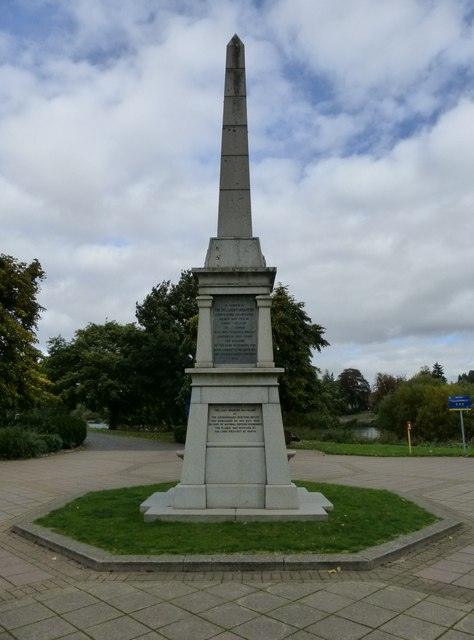
Memorial at the North Inch, Perth

An obelisk monument, located at the southern end of Perth's North Inch, commemorates the regiment. Unveiled by Garnet Wolseley, 1st Viscount Wolseley, on 8 December 1896, one of its plaques reads:

The Regiment served with distinction at Mandora 1801, Martinique 1803, Guadeloupe 1810, in America 1814–5, South Africa 1846–7 and 1878–9, Crimea 1854–6, Indian Mutiny 1857–8 and on 1st July 1881 was formed into the Second Battalion The Cameronians (Scottish Rifles)

Another plaque states:

The last Regular Battalion of the Cameronians (Scottish Rifles) was disbanded on 14th May 1968 as part of national defence economies

== Sources ==
- Delavoye, Alexander Marin (1880). Records of the 90th Regiment, (Perthshire Light Infantry); with roll of officers from 1795 to 1880. Richardson & Co.
- Shand, Alexander Innes (1902). Wellington's Lieutenants. Smith, Elder & Company.
- Carman, W. Y. (1985), Richard Simkin's Uniforms of the British Army: The Infantry Regiments, Great Britain: Webb and Bower Publishers, ISBN 0-86350-031-5
