= Alexander Shand =

Alexander Shand may refer to:

- Alexander Shand, 1st Baron Shand (1828–1904), Scottish advocate and judge
- Alexander Faulkner Shand (1858–1936), English writer and barrister
- Alexander Shand (ethnologist) (1840–1910), New Zealand farmer, interpreter and ethnographer
- Alexander Shand (barrister) (1865–1949), Australian barrister
- Alexander Innes Shand (1832–1907), Scottish barrister and author
