= William Bradshaw (VC) =

Irish recipient of the Victoria Cross (1830–1861)

- Born: 12 February 1830; Thurles, County Tipperary
- Died: 9 March 1861 (aged 31); Thurles
- Burial place: St Mary's Church graveyard, Thurles
- Military career
- Allegiance: United Kingdom
- Branch: British Army
- Rank: Assistant Surgeon
- Units: 50th Regiment of Foot; 90th Regiment of Foot; 32nd Regiment of Foot
- Conflicts: Crimean War; Indian Mutiny
- Awards: Victoria Cross

William Bradshaw VC (12 February 1830 – 9 March 1861), born in Thurles, County Tipperary, was an Irish recipient of the Victoria Cross, the highest and most prestigious award for valour in the face of the enemy that can be awarded to British and Commonwealth forces.

== Details ==
He served during the Crimean War in the 50th Regiment of Foot transferring to the 90th Regiment of Foot.

Bradshaw was 27 years old, and an assistant surgeon in the 90th Regiment (later known as The Cameronians (Scottish Rifles)), British Army during the Indian Mutiny when the following deed took place on 26 September 1857 at Lucknow, India, for which he was awarded the VC:

Assistant-Surgeon William Bradshaw

Date of Act of Bravery, 26th September, 1857

For intrepidity and good conduct when, ordered with Surgeon Home, 90th Regiment, to remove the wounded men left behind the column that forced its way into the Residency of Lucknow, on the 26th September, 1857. The dooly bearers had left the doolies, but by great exertions, and notwithstanding the close proximity of the sepoys, Surgeon Home, and Assistant-Surgeon Bradshuw, got some of the bearers together, and Assistant-Surgeon Bradshaw with about twenty doolies, becoming separated from the rest of the party, succeeded in reaching the Residency in safety by the river bank.

== Later life ==
William Bradshaw died on 9 March 1861 and is buried at St Mary's Church graveyard, Thurles. Memorial is in the church. His Victoria Cross is displayed at the Army Medical Services Museum (Aldershot, Hampshire England).

== See also ==
Anthony Dickson Home
