= Patrick Graham (VC) =

Irish recipient of the Victoria Cross

- Born: 1837; Dublin, Ireland
- Died: 3 June 1875 (aged 37–38); Dublin
- Burial place: Arbour Hill Cemetery, Dublin
- Military career
- Allegiance: United Kingdom
- Branch: British Army
- Rank: Private
- Units: 90th Regiment of Foot
- Conflicts: Indian Mutiny
- Awards: Victoria Cross

Patrick Graham VC (1837 – 3 June 1875) was born in St Michael's Parish, Dublin and was an Irish recipient of the Victoria Cross, the highest and most prestigious award for gallantry in the face of the enemy that can be awarded to British and Commonwealth forces.

== Details ==
He was about 20 years old, and a private in the 90th Regiment of Foot (later The Cameronians (Scottish Rifles)), British Army during the Indian Mutiny when the following deed took place for which he was awarded the VC:

90th Regiment, Private P. Graham

Date of Act of Bravery, 17th November, 1857

For bringing in a wounded comrade under a very heavy fire, on the 17th of November, 1857, at Lucknow. Elected by the private soldiers of the Regiment.

He died in Dublin on 3 June 1875. His Victoria Cross is displayed in the Cameronians Regimental Museum at Hamilton, Lanarkshire, Scotland.
