= Robert Lindsey Clark =

English sculptor (1864–1925)

Robert Lindsey Clark (1864–1925) was an English sculptor who started as an apprentice at H.H. Martyn & Co. and then studied at Lambeth School of Art. He returned to Martyns before 1901, and became their head of sculpture and art director in 1905. While working on the Queen Victoria Memorial, Calcutta, he spent a considerable amount of time in the marble quarries in Carrara. He exhibited widely and was made a member of the Royal British Society of Sculptors in 1911.

Philip Lindsey Clark was a pupil in his father's studio at Martyns but in 1910 moved to london, where he had a notable career as a sculptor.

Robert's grandson, Michael Clark (1918-1990), also became a sculptor, largely creating religious works.
