= Winston Barracks =

British Army base, Lanark, Scotland

- Lanark
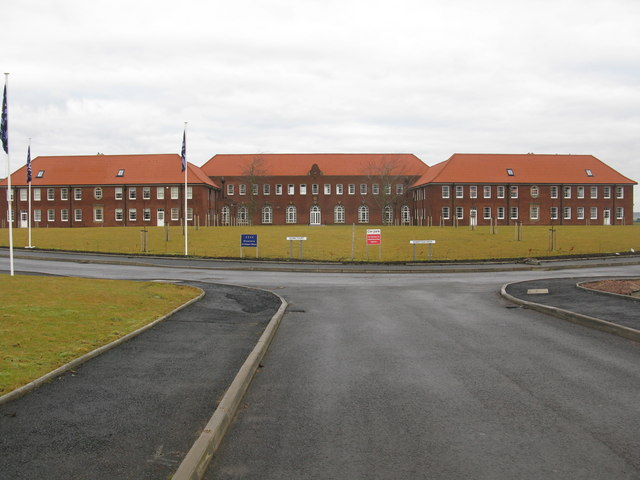
- The redeveloped accommodation block at Winston Barracks

Site information
- Type: Barracks
- Owner: Ministry of Defence
- Operator: British Army

Location
- Location within South Lanarkshire
- Coordinates: 55°39′40″N 03°43′48″W

Site history
- Built: 1939-1941
- Built for: War Office
- In use: 1941-1994

Winston Barracks was a British Army base, located 2 miles (3.2 km) east of Lanark, Scotland. It was situated in the fork of the A73 and A70 trunk roads, close to Lanark Racecourse. The site was decommissioned in 1994, and some of the buildings have been renovated as part of a housing development.

== History ==
Winston Barracks was built between 1939 and 1941 to accommodate the Depot of the Cameronians (Scottish Rifles), whose previous depot at Hamilton Barracks was becoming inadequate. The buildings were designed to "embody all the latest devices of permanent construction" and the cost was estimated to be in the region of £150,000. The buildings were mainly in Neo-Georgian style, the most prominent being the main H-shaped barrack block on the north side of the parade ground. Most of the buildings were completed in 1939 with completion of the complex in 1940, as attested by the dates on the rain water hoppers found high on the south elevation of the main barrack block. The site occupied a total of 55 acres (22 ha) and incorporated barrack blocks, officers' quarters, non-commissioned officers' quarters, stores, boiler houses, medical block, gymnasium, assault course, and firing and rifle ranges. In 1939, with the Regiment about to move to its new accommodation, the Second World War broke out.

Instead of housing the Cameronians, 26 Primary Training Centre was established at Winston Barracks. The nearby racecourse was utilised during the war as a training area, for overflow camp accommodation and for practice trench-digging. After the war, the Cameronians took up residence in 1947, alongside various training units.

From 1961 the Barracks were shared by the Royal Highland Fusiliers and the Cameronians. Both regiments moved to the Lowland Brigade Depot at Glencorse Barracks, Edinburgh, when it opened in 1964. The 52nd Lowland Division took over the barracks until it closed in 1967.

At around the time (c. 1960) that RAF Kirknewton housed an American signals intelligence unit, Winston Barracks was known as RAF Lanark. Winston Barracks, like Ritchie Camp, was earmarked during the Cold War as an emergency 1,000-bed hospital for the US Navy.

The barracks were also used as a headquarters and training centre for the Glasgow and Lanarkshire Battalion of the Army Cadet Force. Before its move to new purpose built cadet centre in Cambuslang.

Responding to a Commons Written Question on 26 February 1987, the Secretary of State for Defence stated that "We have recently agreed in principle to make these sites (Winston camp, Lanark, and Ritchie camp, Kirknewton) available to the United States forces for use as peacetime medical storage facilities and as hospitals which would be activated in the event of war."

== Redevelopment ==
In 1994, the Ministry of Defence relinquished all control of the site and sold it to a development company. In 2000, four of the buildings were listed: the Sergeants' Mess and the Accommodation Block were protected at category B, while the Officers' Mess and Guardhouse were protected at category C(s).

In 2008, planning permission was granted for the demolition of all of the barracks buildings, with the exception of the four listed buildings, and construction of 348 houses on the site. The four main buildings were to be converted into 45 luxury apartments. As part of the redevelopment, the conversion of the category B listed "Sandhurst" Accommodation Block has created 20 townhouses and 16 two-bedroom apartments.
