= William Rennie (Victoria Cross) =

Scottish recipient of the Victoria Cross

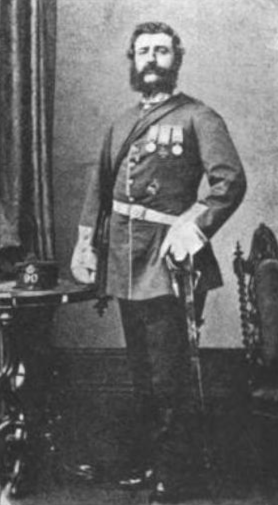
- Born: 1 November 1821; Elgin, Moray
- Died: 22 August 1896 (aged 74); Elgin
- Burial place: Elgin Cemetery
- Military career
- Allegiance: United Kingdom
- Branch: British Army
- Rank: Lieutenant-Colonel
- Units: 90th Regiment of Foot (Perthshire Volunteers)
- Conflicts: Indian Mutiny
- Awards: Victoria Cross

Lieutenant-Colonel William Rennie VC (1 November 1821 – 22 August 1896) was a Scottish recipient of the Victoria Cross, the highest and most prestigious award for gallantry in the face of the enemy that can be awarded to British and Commonwealth forces.

== Details ==
Rennie was 34 years old, and a lieutenant and adjutant in the 90th Regiment of Foot (later The Cameronians (Scottish Rifles), British Army during the Indian Mutiny when the following deeds took place at the siege of Lucknow for which he was awarded the VC:

For conspicuous gallantry in the advance upon Lucknow, under the late Major-General Havelock, on the 21st of September, 1857, in having charged the enemy's guns in advance of the skirmishers of the 90th Light Infantry, under a heavy musketry fire, and prevented them dragging off one gun, which was consequently captured. For conspicuous gallantry at Lucknow on the 25th of September, 1857, in having charged in advance of the 90th column, in the face of a heavy fire of grape, forcing the enemy to abandon their guns.

== Further information ==
Lieutenant Rennie was promoted to captain on 9 January 1863, major on 10 December 1873, lieutenant-colonel on 28 March 1874 and retired in 1875. He died at Elgin in August 1896, aged 74 years. His headstone is at Elgin Cemetery (Lair H-96), Moray, Scotland.

== The medal ==
His Victoria Cross is displayed at the Cameronians Regimental Museum, Hamilton, Lanarkshire, Scotland. The museum had bought the medal in January 1969 for the then-record value of £1,700.
