= Hamilton Barracks =

- Hamilton, South Lanarkshire
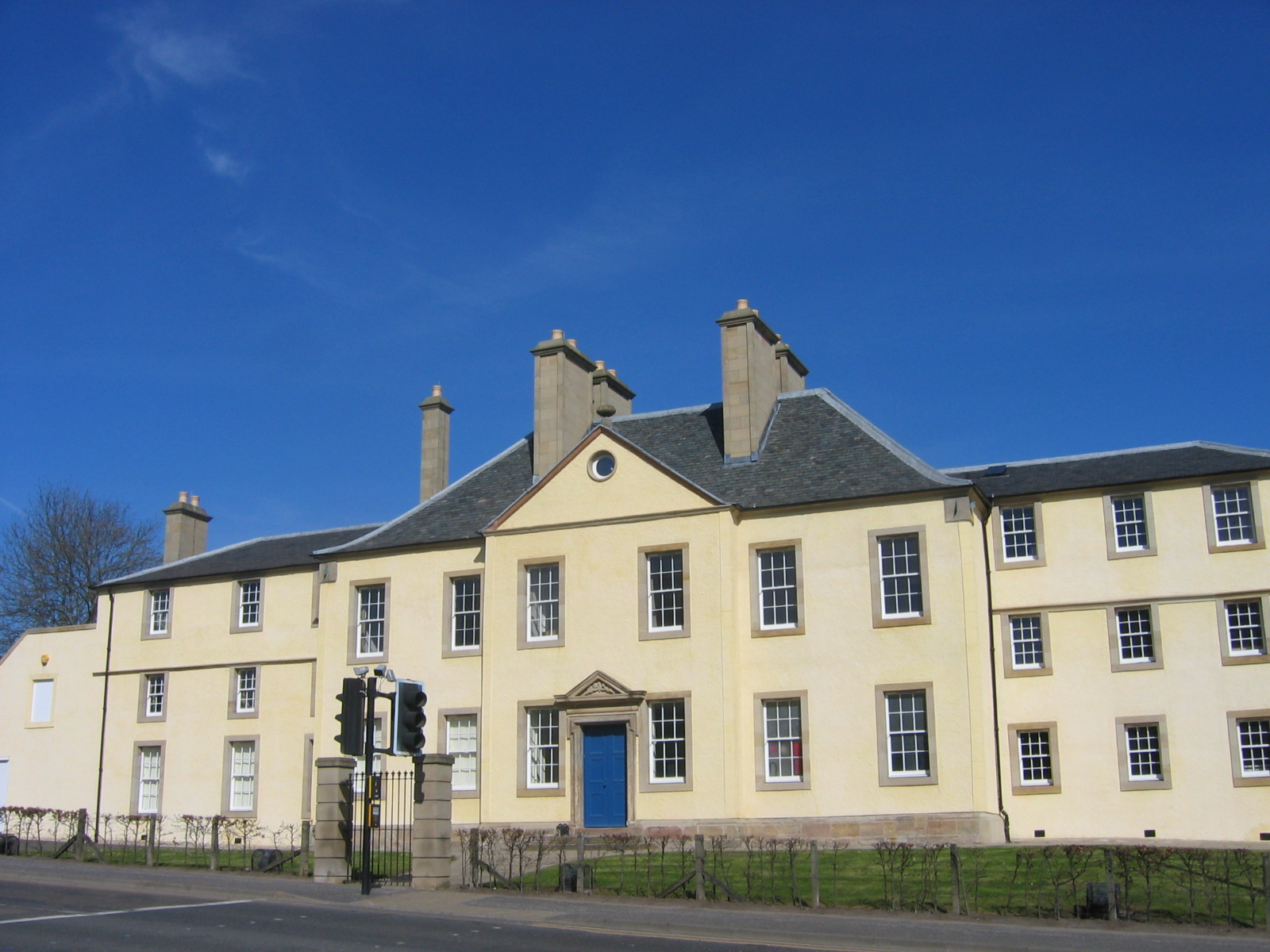
- Low Parks Museum (incorporating the Regimental Museum of the Cameronians)

Site information
- Type: Barracks
- Owner: Ministry of Defence
- Operator: British Army

Location
- Location within South Lanarkshire
- Coordinates: 55.780°N 4.047°W

Site history
- Built: 1794-1795
- Built for: War Office
- In use: 1795-1947

Hamilton Barracks was a military installation in Hamilton, South Lanarkshire.

== History ==
The barracks, which were originally designed for use by cavalry, were built between 1794 and 1795. The cavalry moved out to Maryhill Barracks in Glasgow in 1877 and the barracks were converted for infantry use. The conversion took place as part of the Cardwell Reforms which encouraged the localisation of British military forces.

The barracks became the depot for the 26th (Cameronian) Regiment of Foot and the 74th (Highland) Regiment of Foot. Under the Childers Reforms, the 26th (Cameronian) Regiment of Foot amalgamated with the 90th Regiment of Foot (Perthshire Volunteers) to form the Cameronians (Scottish Rifles) with its depot in the barracks in 1881.

The barracks also became the depot for the 73rd (Perthshire) Regiment of Foot and the 90th Regiment of Foot (Perthshire Volunteers). Under the Childers Reforms, the 71st (Highland) Regiment of Foot amalgamated with the 74th (Highland) Regiment of Foot to form the Highland Light Infantry with its depot in the barracks in 1881.

Many volunteers enlisted at the barracks at the start of the First World War. The barracks fell into a state of disrepair and the Highland Light Infantry moved its depot to Maryhill Barracks in March 1921. The Cameronians, who had been scheduled to move out in the late 1930s, saw action in the Second World War and then re-located to Winston Barracks in 1947. The barracks were demolished in the 1960s and the site was occupied by Bell College in 1972: Bell College evolved to become the Hamilton Campus of the University of the West of Scotland in 2007. Low Parks Museum, which incorporates the Regimental Museum of the Cameronians, is situated only a few hundred yards to the East of the site of the former barracks.
