= Thomas Carter (writer) =

British Army clerk and military writer

Thomas Carter (died 1867) was a British Army clerk and military writer.

== Career ==
From 1839 a temporary clerk at the Horse Guards, Carter rose to the position of first clerk in the adjutant-general's office. He died on 9 August 1867.

== Works ==
Carter assisted Richard Cannon in the preparation of historical records of the British Army, and after Cannon retired edited the published records of the 26th (Cameronian) Regiment of Foot and 44th (East Essex) Regiment of Foot; and made a new edition of the records of the Somerset Light Infantry (13th Light Infantry). These were not official publications. He was author of:

- Curiosities of War, London, 1860; and
- Medals of the British Army, London, 1861–2.

He was also a regular contributor to Notes and Queries.

== Notes ==
Attribution This article incorporates text from a publication now in the public domain: Stephen, Leslie, ed. (1887). "Carter, Thomas (d.1867)". Dictionary of National Biography. Vol. 9. London: Smith, Elder & Co.
