= Philip Lindsey Clark =

English sculptor (1889–1977)

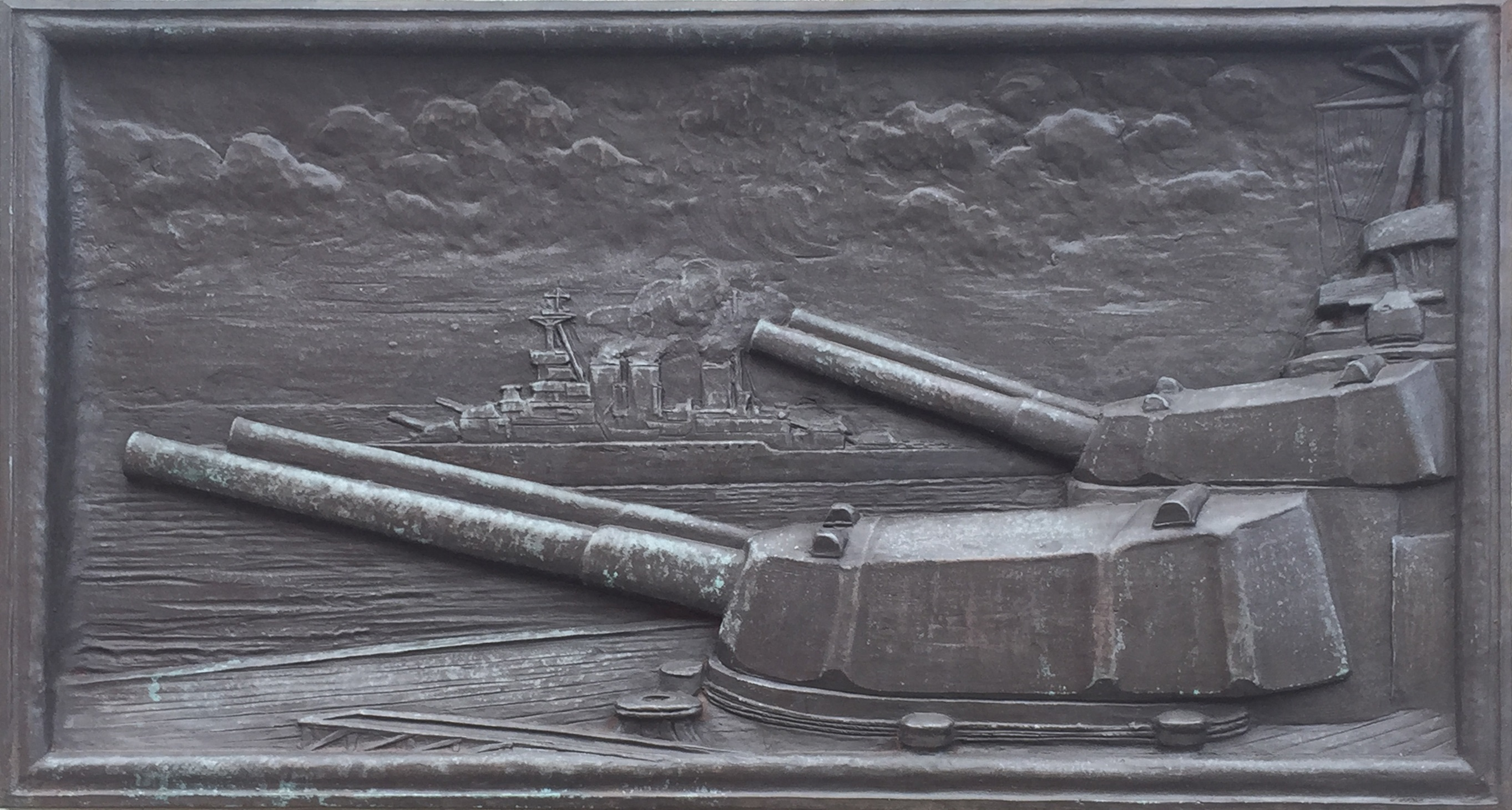
- Southwark War Memorial
- Born: 1889; Brixton, London
- Died: 1977 (aged 87–88)
- Education: Cheltenham School of Art, City and Guilds at Kennington, Royal Academy Schools
- Known for: Sculpture
- Notable work: Sculpture
- Father: Robert Lindsey Clark

Philip Lindsey Clark (1889–1977) was an English sculptor.

== Background ==
Philip Lindsey Clark was born in London. His father was the sculptor Robert Lindsey Clark.

He worked with his father at the Cheltenham School of Art from 1905 to 1910 and then from 1910 to 1914 studied at the City and Guilds School in Kennington. He had a most distinguished war record in the First World War, winning the DSO. At the end of the war he won a scholarship to the Royal Academy Schools to continue his training and remained there from 1919 to 1924. From 1920 to 1952 he was a regular exhibitor at the Royal Academy Summer Exhibition and from 1921 onwards at the Paris Salon. From 1930 his work became more and more of a religious nature and he became a Carmelite Tertiary. He eventually retired from London and lived in Devon.

== Details of some of his works ==
Place	Location	Notes and
Aylesford Priory	Aylesford	Clark carried out sculptural work for the Priory. Here he was assisted by his son Michael Clark.
St Francis Xavier Cathedral	Geraldton, Western Australia	Stations of the Cross. Apparently replicas of a set of Stations of the Cross in a London Church which is yet to be identified.
National Shrine of Saint Jude (England)	Faversham	He sculpted three statues: Saint Jude, Our Lady and Jesus. They were made for the College Chapel at Saint Mary's, Llandeilo, Wales, which was run by the Carmelites. It was then moved to two more Carmelite homes: Allington Castle, and then for the last 20 years it was based in East Finchley before finally moving to Faversham
The Cameronians (Scottish Rifles) War Memorial	Kelvingrove Park, Glasgow, Scotland	The memorial commemorating The Cameronians (Scottish Rifles) is located in Kelvingrove, Glasgow and was unveiled on 9 August 1924 by Field Marshal The Earl Haig. It is located just outside Kelvingrove Art Gallery and Museum.
English Martyrs' Church	Wallasey, Merseyside	Sculptures on the exterior of the church were by Clark.
Holy Apostles Catholic Church	Pimlico, London	This church's Stations of the Cross are by Clark.
Our Lady and St Edmund of Abingdon	Abingdon, Oxfordshire	Clark restored the statue of Our Lady for this church.
Our Lady of Dolours Church	Hendon, Middlesex	Clark carved a white stone statue of Our Lady of Dolours for this church.
Sacred Heart Church	Sheffield, Yorkshire	For Sacred Heart Church, Clark carved the Stations of the Cross, was responsible for the sculptural work on the font, created the statue of The Sacred Heart and carried out the carvings in the tympanum above the entrance door.
St Augustine's Church, Ramsgate	Ramsgate, Kent	Sculpture of St Anthony holding the child Jesus. Attached to central column inside the western wall.
St Bonaventure Church	Welwyn Garden City, Hertfordshire	Clark carved a statue of St Bonaventure which is located over the west door of the church.
St Lawrence’s Church	Feltham, Middlesex	Clark carved several statues for this church.
St Mary's Cemetery	Kensal Green, London	One of Clark's works was the "Belgian Soldiers' Memorial" in St Mary's Roman Catholic Cemetery in Kensal Green, Greater London. This was unveiled on 11 December 1932 by the Ambassador of Belgium.
St Mary’s Church Glastonbury	Glastonbury, Wiltshire	Designed the statue "Our Lady St Mary of Glastonbury" for the Catholic Church on Magadalene Street, Glastonbury.
St Mary's Church, Warrington	Warrington, Cheshire	Statue of "Our Lady of Lourdes" at St Mary's, Warrington.
St Richard’s Roman Catholic Church	Chichester, Sussex	In 1963 Clark and his son Michael created a bronze crucifix for the front of this church.
Shrewsbury Cathedral	Shrewsbury, Shropshire	Low-relief stone Stations of the Cross, 1952.
Smethwick War Memorial	Smethwick, Warwickshire	War Memorial to the men of Smethwick killed in the First World War. Unveiled and dedicated in 1925.
Southwark War Memorial	Southwark, Inner London	Southwark War Memorial was unveiled by General Lord Horn of Stirkoke on 16 November 1922 and dedicated on the same day by the Bishop of Southwark.
Statue of William Dennis	Kirton, Lincolnshire	1930 work features William Dennis known as the "Potato King".
Westminster Cathedral	Westminster, London	In one of his most prestigious commissions, Clark carved the figure of St George in the Chapel of St George and the English Martyrs in Westminster Cathedral.
Widegate Street	Spitalfields, City of London	Clark completed four sculptures representing bakers on the front of the premises of the 1926 built Nordheim Model Bakery building at numbers twelve and thirteen Widegate Street. This is a George Val Myers building.

== Other work ==
Clark did other work in Sheffield apart from Sacred Heart church. One was a limestone motif and coat of arms above the main entrance to The Royal Institute of the Blind building in Mappin Street, executed in 1938. The building has been demolished, but the Clark sculpture has been kept and it was when a new Institute of the Blind building was built in Judd Street. The work was of a blindfolded head and the right hand column was topped by a hand interpreting Braille in front of a symbol for light. The work also featured the Royal coat of arms. It seems that Clark also worked on reliefs for the Gas Showrooms on Commercial Street in Sheffield.

At the St Theresa Of The Child Jesus Church in Manor, Sheffield, Clark carved the stone statue of St Theresa above the main door of the church and the fourteen low relief stone Stations of the Cross inside. He also designed the internal boss in relief at the centre the dome, only visible from the sanctuary, depicting the Assumption of the Blessed Virgin Mary into Heaven. He carved the wooden statues of St Theresa kneeling, St Joseph the Carpenter, The Sacred Heart of Jesus and the Virgin Mary offering the swaddled Holy Child, for the four side chapels. The wooden carvings were painted by his son Michael Clark, who also carved and painted the larger than life size crucifix of Christ the King above the high altar. All colours used in the painting was pastel, light in nature, in harmony with the light planned to flood the church by its architect John Rochford. P.L.Clark wrote in the souvenir brochure for the opening of the church, 3 October 1960 ( the then feast day of St .Theresa.) "What can I do but explain something of what I have tried to say in stone, with the large Statue outside of St. Theresa offering herself to God, and inside the Stations of the Cross. I would ask you particularly with the Stations to look at them not once, but until you get used to them. I have tried by the elimination of what I think to be non-essential details, to arrive at the greatest possible simplicity of treatment, thereby giving emphasis to what is expressed... You see also a contrast in the large Crucifix by my son Michael Clark, showing Our Lord as Christ The King, reigning from the cross. He has also painted for me my four wood figures. Our Lady offering to us the Holy Child, in swaddling clothes; a kneeling St Theresa, showing her love for Our Lord in the way she holds and looks at the crucifix; the Sacred Heart in all the humility of His burning love for humanity; then St. Joseph the Carpenter, guardian of the Holy Family." This collaboration between father and son together with the large amount of Clark family original works in one building, twenty individual sculptures, make the church of St. Theresa of significant cultural importance to twentieth century devotional art and Catholic history.

[27]

By 2021, the crucifix by Michael Clark was the only remaining wooden statue in the church, the other four original Clark Family artworks have been removed and replaced by off-the-shelf, conventional representations, changing the original dedications of the chapels. The Lady Chapel, to the South of the Sanctuary, that once housed Clark's unique and serene representation of the Virgin with the swaddled Christ Child suspended, hovering at her breast, is now the Sacred Heart Chapel, with a heavy, traditional representation of Christ, rather than Clark's spiritual, simple and slight statue of the same subject, that was once housed in the chapel at the rear of the church, to the north west. The loss of these original artworks, and the addition of coloured, painted walls, significantly diminishes the impact of the simplicity of the original interior of the church as planned by its designers, and of the visionary priest who commissioned it and all of the art it once housed, Fr Denis McGillicuddy.

== Gallery ==
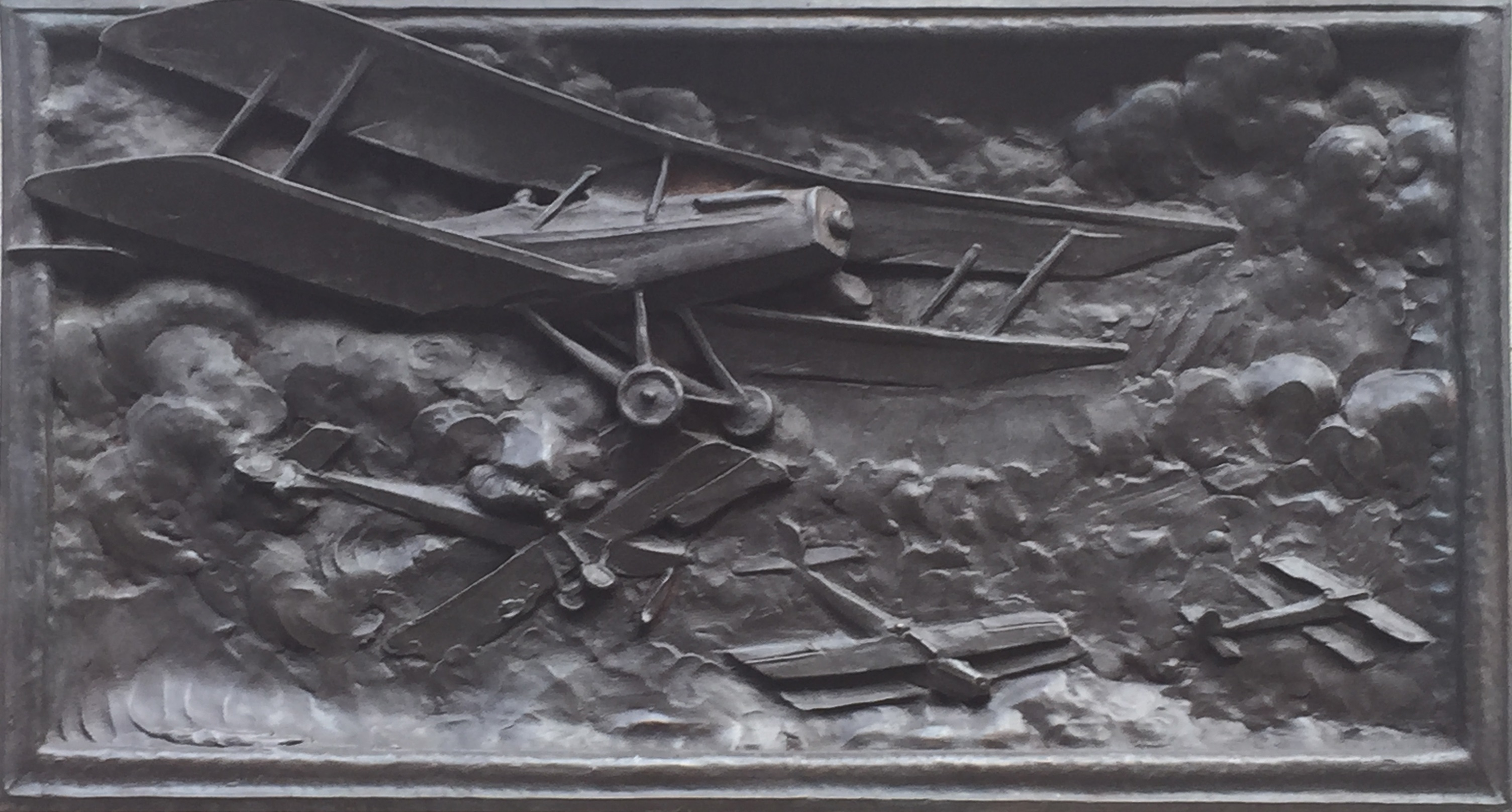
Southwark War Memorial- one of the bas-reliefs on the side of the memorial

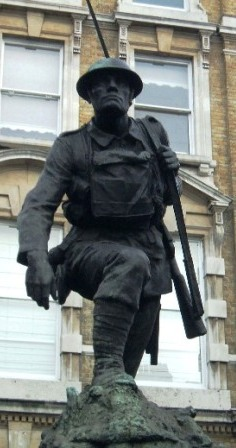
Southwark War Memorial- Main sculpture- Advancing Infantryman

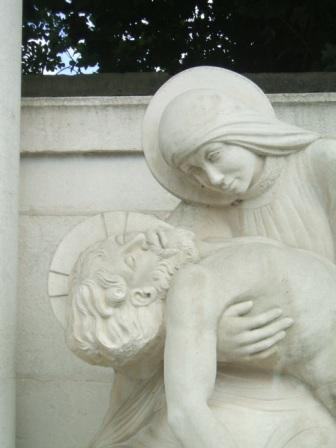
Belgian Soldiers’ Memorial in Kensal Green Cemetery- Pieta

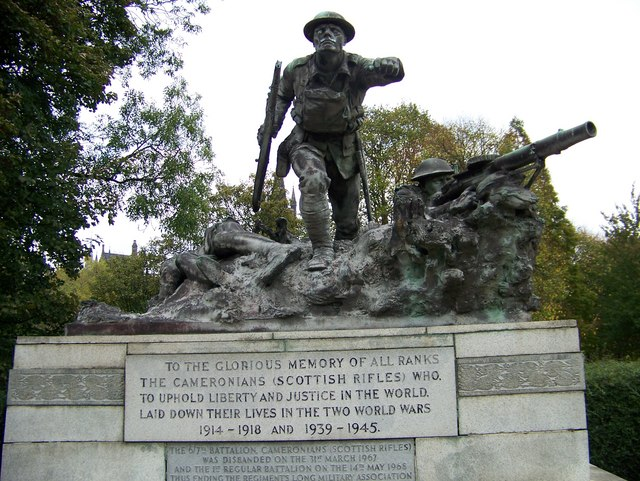
View of The Cameronians (Scottish Rifles) Memorial. Image courtesy Eliott Simpson/Geograph.
