= James Douglas, Earl of Angus =

Scottish nobleman and soldier

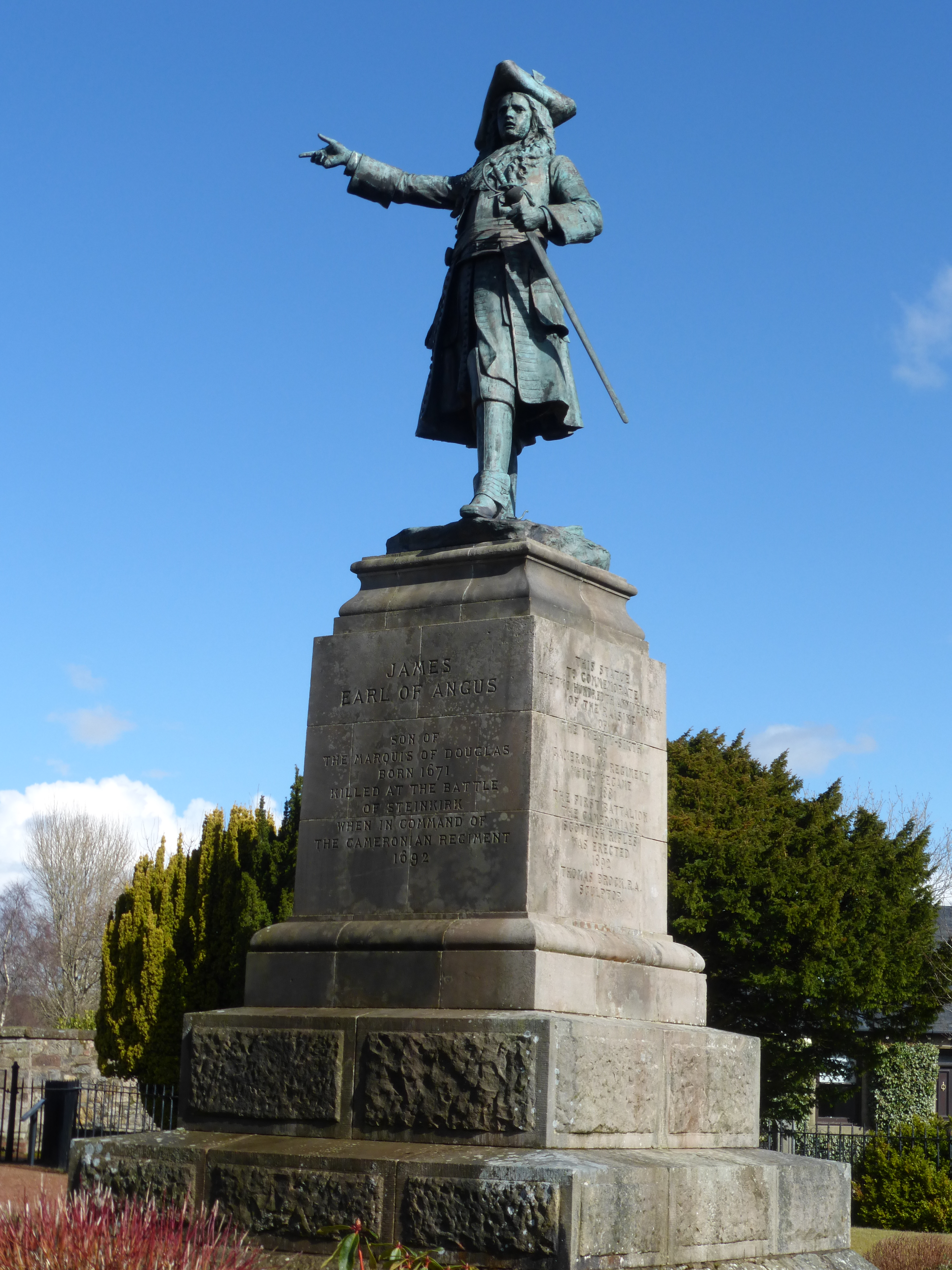
Statue of James Douglas, Earl of Angus, Cameronian Memorial at Douglas

James Douglas, Earl of Angus (1671 – 3 August 1692) was a Scottish nobleman and soldier.

He was born at Douglas Castle, Douglas, South Lanarkshire. The son of James Douglas, 2nd Marquess of Douglas and his first wife Lady Barbara Erskine, eldest daughter of John Erskine, 20th Earl of Mar.

== Education ==
Angus was sent for his education to a private residence, in England, to be tutored by a Master Abernethy. His father's impecunious position aroused the interest of King Charles II who wrote to the Lord Chancellor of Scotland, George Gordon, 1st Earl of Aberdeen:

Being informed that Lord Angus is in a private place within some miles of London, and haveing a more than ordinary concern in his education, both on the account of his immediat descent from the most loyall and ancient family of Douglas (by which so many signall services have been performed to our royal predecessors for many ages), and of the earnest desire we have that, in case of his liveing to represent it, he may not in his younger years becorrupted with ill principles, we have thought fit hereby to authorise you to speak with his father the Marques of Douglas, and to know from him to whose carehe has committed a trust of so much importance to our service and to himself, as is that of his son's education, at such a great distance from his relations, to the end that if, upon notice thereof from you, we shall not have reason to be therewith well satisisfied we may order a better course to be taken in reference to his breeding. It is our will and pleasure that you call for from the Marques, and transmit to usan account of the present condition of his eatate, particularly of the burden of debts wherewith it stands affected, and of the true extent of the yearly rent, both reall and casuall; as also of the courses (if any be) set down for the discharge of these debts, wherein you are to take the assistance of some of the nearest relations of the family. For truly we have so great a regard, not only to the standing thereof, but also its continuance in a splendid and plentiful condition, as we cannot but highly concern ourselfe in the right management of their fortune

Charles went further, and laid down an annuity of £200 a year for the education of young Angus. This grant was confirmed by Charles' brother, James VII, and Angus was often present at his court.

== Revolution ==
Angus' time at court notwithstanding, the Douglas estates of his father lay in some of the staunchest presbyterian, covenanting territory in Scotland, and his tenantry were not at all amenable to King James, a Catholic.

By 1688, Angus was back in Scotland and had given his support to William of Orange. He set about roaming his father's lands of Douglasdale to raise men to raise a new regiment from the Cameronian party. By 1689 he was Colonel of the newly founded Earl of Angus' Regiment. On the 14 May 1689 he paraded his men on the marquess' Holm, next to the Douglas Water.

The new regiment would after 1751 be known as the 26th (The Cameronian) Regiment of Foot, and from 1881 as the Cameronians (Scottish Rifles), the regiment was finally disbanded in 1968, but lived on in two companies of the 52nd Lowland Regiment TA until 1997.

== Netherlands ==
In 1689, however, the new Earl of Angus' Regiment was sent to quell the Jacobite Highlands and defended the town of Dunkeld eventually leading to the Battle of Dunkeld. Angus was not at this action, his regiment being commanded by Lt. Col. William Cleland. Angus' father, mindful of his age had sent him back south to London to complete his studies. Angus did not want to spend his time in London as a needy Scotsman, and was actively looking for an heiress to restore his family's financial probity. In a letter to his father's steward dated 26 December 1689, he states his intentions to go abroad to look for such a match. The Marquess of Douglas still fearing for his sons safety at home had no objection to his son going hence from Great Britain. The King's permission was granted and Angus obtained as far as the University of Utrecht.

Before too long at Utrecht, Angus started to hear whispers, that it was unseemly for a Colonel to be away from his regiment whilst they were at war. The regiment at this time was fighting in the armies of King William against Louis XIV of France. In By 1692, Angus was desperate to prove himself, as is attested by a letter home to his father begging him leave either to return to his men or return to obscurity in Scotland. It is not apparent what his father's reply was but James Douglas, Earl of Angus took command of his regiment, and died leading his men into action at the Battle of Steenkerque on the 3rd of August of that year.

== Commemoration ==
The Earl of Angus statue on the Marquess' Holm in Douglas village, was erected in 1888 to mark the bi-centenary of the raising of the Regiment, it features a figure of the Young Angus pointing towards the surrounding hills where he was able to raise so many loyal men. On 17 May 1992 it was given by the Cameronian Trust into the care of the National Trust for Scotland.

Military offices
Preceded by Newly created	Colonel of the Cameronian Regiment; 1689–1692	Succeeded by Colonel Andrew Monro

== Sources ==
- Maxwell, Herbert. A History of the House of Douglas and Angus Freemantle, London, 1902
