= Henry Lysons =

Recipient of the Victoria Cross

Colonel Henry Lysons VC CB
- Born: 30 July 1858; Morden, Surrey, England
- Died: 24 July 1907 (aged 48); Marylebone, London, England
- Burial place: St Peter's Churchyard, Rodmarton
- Relatives: General Sir Daniel Lysons (father); Daniel Lysons (grandfather)
- Military career
- Allegiance: United Kingdom
- Branch: British Army
- Service years: 1875–1907
- Rank: Colonel
- Units: 90th Regiment of Foot; The Cameronians (Scottish Rifles); Royal Fusiliers; Bedfordshire Regiment
- Conflicts: Anglo-Zulu War; Mahdist War
- Awards: Victoria Cross; Companion of the Order of the Bath; Mentioned in Despatches (2)

Colonel Henry Lysons, VC, CB (30 July 1858 – 24 July 1907) was a British Army officer and a recipient of the Victoria Cross, the highest award for gallantry in the face of the enemy that can be awarded to British and Commonwealth forces.

== Family ==
Lysons was a member of the Lysons family of Hemsted Park, Gloucestershire. He was the son of General Sir Daniel Lysons, son of the antiquarian Daniel Lysons, and Harriet Sophia Bridges.

== Military career ==
Lysons was 20 years old, and a lieutenant in the 2nd Battalion, 90th Regiment of Foot, British Army during the Anglo-Zulu War when the following deed took place for which he was awarded the Victoria Cross (VC).

On 28 March 1879 at the Hlobane Mountain, South Africa, Lieutenant Lysons, with a captain and a private (Edmund John Fowler) dashed forward in advance of the party which had been ordered to dislodge the enemy from a commanding position in natural caves up the mountain. The path was so narrow that they had to advance in single file and the captain who arrived first at the mouth of the cave was instantly killed. Lieutenant Lysons and the private, undeterred by the death of their leader, immediately sprang forward and cleared the enemy out of their stronghold.

Lysons, by now having transferred to the Bedfordshire Regiment (later the Bedfordshire and Hertfordshire Regiment), achieved the rank of colonel on 23 July 1904 when he was made an assistant quartermaster general with Madras Command.

His VC is displayed at the Cameronians Regimental Museum, Hamilton, Lanarkshire, Scotland
