= Manenti =

Manenti is an Italian surname. Notable people with the surname include:

- Davide Manenti (born 1989), Italian sprinter
- John Manenti (born c. 1972), Australian rugby union player
- Vincenzo Manenti (c. 1600–1674), Italian Baroque painter
- Ben Manenti , Italy cricketer representing in 2026 T20 World Cup
- Harry Manenti , Italy cricketer representing in 2026 T20 World Cup
