= Edmund Fowler =

Recipient of the Victoria Cross

Edmund Fowler VC
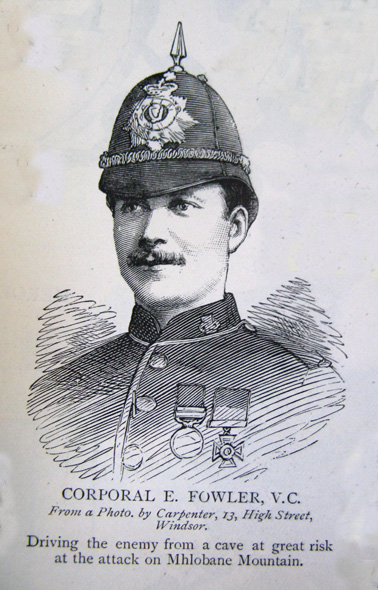
- Born: 1861; Crooke, County Waterford, United Kingdom of Great Britain and Ireland
- Died: 26 March 1926 (aged 64-65); Colchester, Essex United Kingdom
- Military career
- Allegiance: United Kingdom
- Branch: British Army
- Service years: 1877 - 1900
- Rank: Colour-Sergeant
- Units: 90th Regiment of Foot (Perthshire Volunteers); Royal Irish Regiment; Cameronians
- Conflicts: Anglo-Zulu War
- Awards: Victoria Cross

Edmund John Fowler VC (1861 – 26 March 1926) was an Irish recipient of the Victoria Cross, the highest and most prestigious award for gallantry in the face of the enemy that can be awarded to British and Commonwealth forces.

Born in County Waterford, he later achieved the rank of Colour-Sergeant. He died in Colchester, Essex, on 26 March 1926.

== Details ==
He was around 18 years old, and a Private in the 90th Regiment of Foot (Perthshire Volunteers), British Army during the Zulu War when the following deed took place for which he was awarded the VC.

On 28 March 1879 at the Battle of Hlobane, South Africa, Private Fowler, with a captain and a lieutenant (Henry Lysons) dashed forward in advance of the party which had been ordered to dislodge the enemy from a commanding position in natural caves up the mountain. The path was so narrow that they had to advance in single file and the captain who arrived first at the mouth of the cave was instantly killed. The lieutenant and Private Fowler undismayed by the death of their leader, immediately sprang forward and cleared the enemy out of their stronghold.

== The medal ==
His Victoria Cross is displayed at the Cameronians Regimental Museum in the Hamilton Low Parks Museum in Hamilton, Lanarkshire, Scotland.
