= Anthony Home =

Recipient of the Victoria Cross

Sir Anthony Dickson Home VC KCB
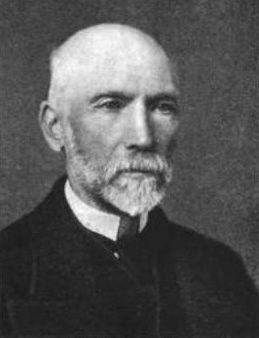
- Born: 30 November 1826; Dunbar, East Lothian
- Died: 10 August 1914 (aged 87); Kensington, London
- Burial place: Highgate Cemetery, London
- Military career
- Allegiance: United Kingdom
- Branch: British Army
- Service years: 1848–1886
- Rank: Surgeon General
- Units: 3rd West India Regiment; 13th Hussars; 90th Regiment of Foot; 35th Regiment of Foot; 8th Hussars
- Conflicts: Crimean War; Indian Mutiny; Second Anglo-Chinese War; New Zealand Wars; Third Anglo-Ashanti War
- Awards: Victoria Cross; Knight Commander of the Most Honourable Order of the Bath; New Zealand War Medal; Crimea Medal with Balaclava and Sebastopol clasps Indian Mutiny Medal with Lucknow and Defence of Lucknow clasps Second China War Medal with Taku Forts 1860 and Pekin 1860 clasps Ashantee Medal, 1873–74; Turkish Crimea Medal

Surgeon General Sir Anthony Dickson Home VC KCB (30 November 1826 – 10 August 1914) was a Scottish recipient of the Victoria Cross, the highest and most prestigious award for gallantry in the face of the enemy that can be awarded to British and Commonwealth forces.

== Biography ==
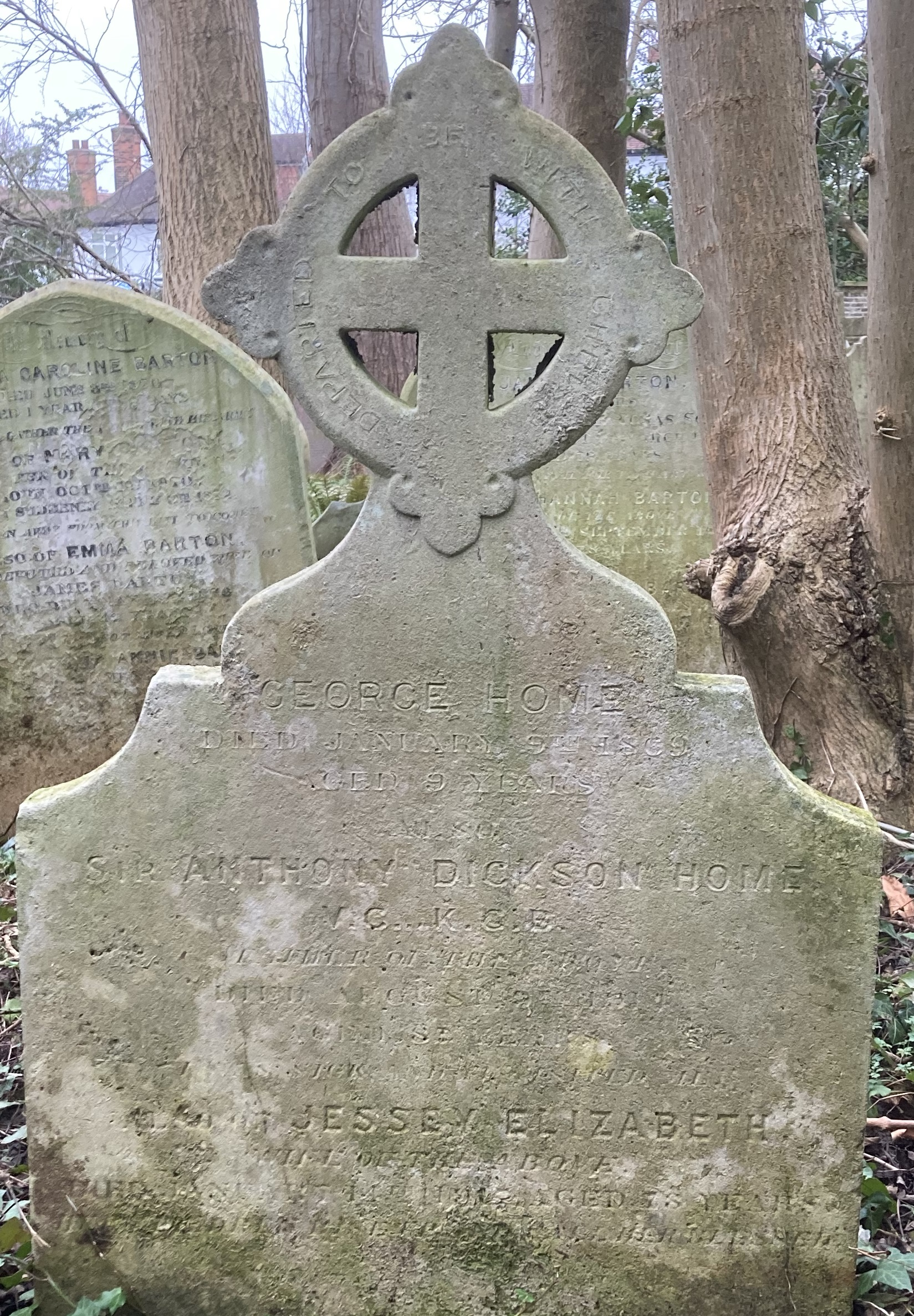
Grave of Sir Anthony Dickson Home in Highgate Cemetery

Home graduated from the University of St Andrews School of Medicine with an MD in 1848. Home was 30 years old, and a surgeon in the 90th Foot, British Army during the Indian Mutiny on 26 September 1857 at the Relief of Lucknow, India, when the following deed took place for which he was awarded the VC:

For persevering bravery and admirable conduct in charge of the wounded men left behind the column, when the troops under the late Major-General Havelock, forced their way into the Residency of Lucknow, on the 26th September, 1857. The escort left with the wounded had, by casualties, been reduced to a few stragglers, and being entirely separated from the column, this small party with the wounded were forced into a house, in which they defended themselves till it was set on fire. They then retreated to a shed a few yards from it, and in this place continued to defend themselves for more than twenty-two hours, till relieved. At last, only six men and Mr. Home remained to fire. Of four officers who were with the party, all were badly wounded, and three are since dead. The conduct of the defence during the latter part of the time devolved therefore on Mr. Home, and to his active exertions previously to being forced into the house, and his good conduct throughout, the safety of any of the wounded, and the successful defence, is mainly to be attributed.

In the early 1860s, Home was stationed in New Zealand and fought in the New Zealand Wars. He was awarded a Knight Commander of the Order of the Bath and achieved the rank of surgeon general.

Arthur Conan Doyle worked with him a few times and stated that, "..he seemed a most disagreeable old man...and yet when I married shortly afterwards he sent me a most charming message wishing me good fortune..."

Home died on 10 August 1914 and was buried on the western side of Highgate Cemetery.

== The medal ==
His Victoria Cross is displayed at the Army Medical Services Museum, Mytchett, Surrey.

== Works ==
- Service Memoirs (1912)
