= Samuel Hill (VC) =

Irish recipient of the Victoria Cross

- Born: c. 1826; Glenavy, County Antrim
- Died: 21 February 1863 (aged 36–37); Meerut, British India
- Burial place: St John's Cemetery, Meerut
- Military career
- Allegiance: United Kingdom
- Branch: British Army
- Service years: 1844–1863 †
- Rank: Sergeant
- Units: 67th Regiment of Foot; 90th Regiment of Foot
- Conflicts: Indian Mutiny
- Awards: Victoria Cross

Samuel Hill VC (c. 1826 in Glenavy, County Antrim – 21 February 1863) was an Irish recipient of the Victoria Cross (VC), the highest and most prestigious award for gallantry in the face of the enemy that can be awarded to British and Commonwealth forces.

In 1844 he enlisted in the 67th Regiment of Foot and then transferred in 1856 to the 90th.

He was about 31 years old, and a sergeant in the 90th Regiment (later The Cameronians – Scottish Rifles), of the British Army during the Indian Mutiny when the following deed took place on 16 and 17 November 1857 at Lucknow, India for which he was awarded the VC:

For gallant conduct on 16 and 17 November 1857, at the storming of the Secundra Bagh at Lucknow, in saving the life of Captain Irby, warding off with his firelock a tulwar cut made at his head by a sepoy, and in going out under a heavy fire to help two wounded men. Also for general gallant conduct throughout the operations for the relief of the Lucknow garrison. Elected by the non-commissioned officers of the Regiment.

He was killed in action, Meerut, India, on 21 February 1863.

His Victoria Cross medal is in the Tolson Memorial Museum, Huddersfield, Yorkshire.

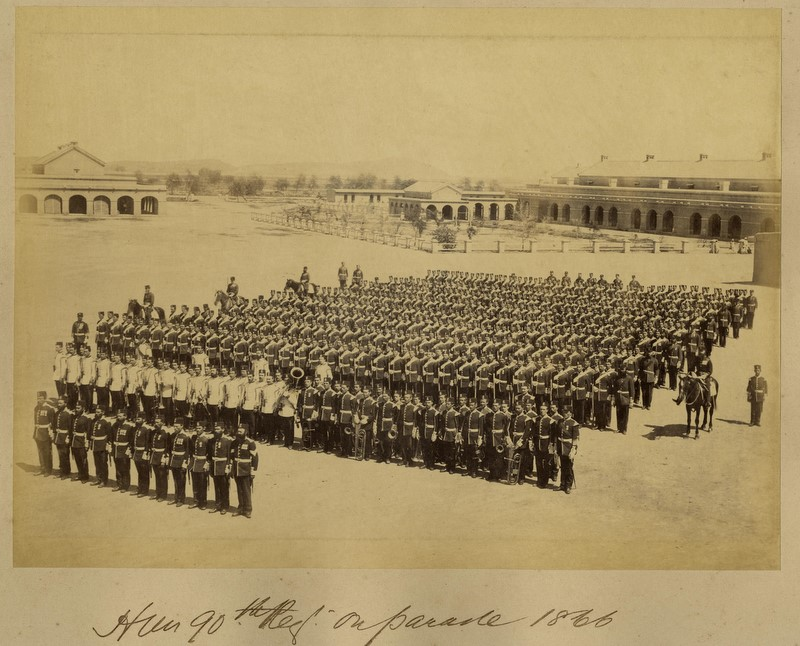
The 90th Regiment of Foot on parade in India, 1866
