= Alexander Innes Shand =

Scottish barrister and author

Alexander Innes Shand (1832–1907) was a Scottish barrister and author, known as a journalist, critic, biographer, novelist and travel writer.

== Life ==
Born at Fettercairn, Kincardineshire, on 2 July 1832, he was the only child of William Shand of Arnhall, Fettercairn, by his second wife, Christina (died 1855) daughter of Alexander Innes of Pitmedden, Aberdeenshire. His father owned estates in Jamaica, which he inherited from his brother John Shand upon the latter's death in 1825. His income was reduced by the abolition of slavery and debts he inherited as the trustee of his brother's estate. William Shand of Arnhall's estate was sequestered in 1834. The family moved to Aberdeen, where Shand was educated at Blairlodge School, entered the University of Aberdeen, and graduated M.A. in 1852.

Shand turned to the law, and in 1855, on his mother's death, he began a series of European tours. When at home he engaged in sport and natural history on the estate of Major John Ramsay, a cousin, at Straloch in Aberdeenshire. In 1865 he was admitted to the Scottish bar and, marrying, settled in Edinburgh. For his wife's health, the couple then moved to Sydenham.

After contributing during 1867 to the Imperial Review, a short-lived conservative paper edited by Henry Cecil Raikes, he began writing for The Times and for Blackwood's Magazine, and also joined John Douglas Cook's staff on the Saturday Review. To these three publications he remained a prolific contributor, and also wrote much elsewhere.

Shand was an old-school Tory who associated with George Meredith, Laurence Oliphant, and George Murray Smith the publisher. In 1893 he was British commissioner with Philip Cunliffe-Owen at the Paris Exhibition. He wrote up to his death, which took place on 20 September 1907 at Edenbridge, Kent. He was buried in the churchyard of Crookham Hill.

== Works ==
To The Times Shand contributed biographies of, among others, Lord Tennyson, Lord Beaconsfield, and Napoleon III, as well as descriptive travel articles, several series of which were collected for separate publication. He was also a correspondent for the newspaper during the Franco-Prussian War, republishing his articles as On the Trail of the War. In 1895 he published a life of his close friend Sir Edward Hamley, which reached a second edition; it revived a controversy about the battle of Tel-el-Kebir. Old World Travel (1903) and Days of the Past (1905) consisted mainly of later sketches from the Saturday Review.

Shand also published:

- Against Time, a novel, 1870.
- Shooting the Rapids, a novel, 1872.
- Letters from the Highlands, 1884.
- Letters from the West of Ireland, 1885.
- Fortune's Wheel, a novel, 1886.
- Half a Century, 1887.
- Kilcurra, a novel, 1891.
- Mountain, Stream and Covert, 1897.
- The Lady Grange, a novel, 1897.
- The War in the Peninsula, 1898.
- Shooting (in the Haddon Hall Library), in collaboration, 1899.
- Life of General John Jacob, 1900.
- Wellington's Lieutenants. Smith, Elder & Company. 1902.
- The Gun Room, 1903.
- Dogs (in the Young England Library), 1903.

There came out posthumously:

- Soldiers of Fortune, 1907.
- Memories of Gardens (his last sketches in the Saturday Review), 1908.

Shand also contributed chapters on "Cookery" to 8 volumes of the Fur, Fin, and Feather series (1898-1905), and prefixed a memoir to Alexander William Kinglake's Eothen (1890 edition).

== Family ==
Shand married on 25 July 1865 Elizabeth Blanche, daughter of William Champion Streatfeild, of Chart's Edge, Westerham, Kent and granddaughter of Elizabeth Fry. She died on 6 June 1882, leaving no children.

== Notes ==
Attribution

This article incorporates text from a publication now in the public domain: Stephen, Leslie, ed. (1885). "Shand, Alexander Innes". Dictionary of National Biography. Vol. 3. London: Smith, Elder & Co.
