= General Dawnay =

General Dawnay may refer to:

- David Dawnay (1903–1971), British Army major general
- Guy Dawnay (British Army officer) (1878–1952), British Army major general
- Hugh Dawnay, 8th Viscount Downe (1844–1924), British Army major general
