= Dining club =

Social group

A dining club (UK) or eating club (US) is a social group, typically requiring membership (which may or may not be exclusive to certain individuals), that meets for dinners and discussions on a regular basis. Some dining clubs have collegiate affiliations, such as the Bullingdon Club at Oxford University or the Princeton University Eating Clubs.

== United Kingdom ==
A dining club differs from a gentlemen's club in that it does not have permanent premises, often changing the location of its meetings and dinners.

Clubs may limit their membership to those who meet highly specific membership requirements. For example, the Coningsby Club requires members to have been a part of either OUCA or CUCA, the Conservative Associations at the Universities of Oxford and Cambridge respectively. Others may require applicants to pass an interview, or simply pay a membership fee.

Early dining clubs include the Pitt Club, the Bullingdon Club, and the 16' Club.

== United States ==
In the United States, similar social clubs, especially in collegiate contexts, are known as eating clubs. Eating clubs date to the late 19th and early 20th centuries and are intended to allow college students to enjoy meals and pleasant discourse. Some clubs are referred to as bicker clubs because of the process of bickering over which applicants to accept as members. Replaced largely by the modern fraternity and sorority system, eating clubs are now limited to a few colleges and universities, most prominently at Princeton University, though other universities including Stanford University, Davidson College, the University of Mount Olive, and Reed College have the presence of eating clubs.

The term dining club is also used in the United States, often to refer to private groups formed for socialization and the enjoyment of unique or elaborate dishes.

Dining clubs often have reciprocity with other dining clubs across the nation or even worldwide. Some are able to arrange reciprocity with other private social clubs with more facilities besides dining such as overnight guest rooms and a gym. Examples of such social clubs include the Penn Club of New York City, which has reciprocity with the India House Club at 1 Hanover Square.

== List of dining clubs ==
This list is incomplete. Date of founding in brackets.

18th-century, or earlier, foundations

- Bean Club (1660)
- Hibernian Catch Club (c. 1680)
- Kit-Cat Club (before 1705)
- Beefsteak Club (c. 1705)
- Loyal Brotherhood (1709–1833)
- October Club (1711–1714)
- Society of Knights of the Round Table (1720)
- Society of Dilettanti (1732)
- Divan Club (1744–1746)
- The Kensington Club (c. 1750–60)
- The Club (1764)
- Aesculapian Club (1773)
- Lunar Society (1775–1813)
- Bullingdon Club (1780)
- Beaver Club (1785–1830s)

19th-century foundations

- Nobody's Friends (1800)
- Canada Club (1810)
- Trinity College Dublin Dining Club, London (c. 1810)
- Grillions (1812)
- Société des douze (1823)
- Geological Society Dining Club (1824)
- Raleigh Club (1827)
- Pitt Club (1835)
- X-club (1864–1893)
- Myrmidon Club (1865)
- The Whitefriars Club (1868)
- Radical Club (1870)
- The 16' Club (c. 1875)
- Ivy Club (1879)
- United and Cecil Club (as the Constituency Union in 1881)
- Cottage Club (1886)
- Marston Club/Vagabonds Club (1887–1894)
- Cap and Gown Club (1890)
- Tiger Inn (1890)
- Colonial Club (1891)
- Omar Khayyám Club (1892)
- New Vagabonds Club (1894–1912)
- Cannon Club (1895)
- Castaways' Club (1895)
- Ye Cherubs (Queens', Cambridge) (1895)
- The Chinese Club (1897)
- Stock Exchange Luncheon Club (1898–2006)

20th- and 21st-century foundations

- Nova Scotia Club (1900)
- Princeton Charter Club (1901)
- Quadrangle Club (1901)
- Coefficients (1902)
- Princeton Tower Club (1902)
- Terrace Club (1904)
- Square Club (1908)
- Chatham Dining Club (1910)
- The Other Club (1911)
- Cercle de l'Union interalliée (1917)
- Romney Street Group (1917)
- Coningsby Club (1921)
- Ratio Club (1949–1958)
- Club 33 (1967)
- Piers Gaveston Society (1977)
- The Squares (1979)
- The University Club (1987)
- Strafford Club (1995)

== Fictional ==
- The Thursday Club, a monthly dining club, features in the novel The Three Hostages by John Buchan.
- The Twelve True Fishermen is the name of a fictional club in the eponymous short story by G. K. Chesterton in which his detective Father Brown solves the riddle of the disappearance of the club's silver.
- The annual dinner of The Ten for Aristology is the scene of a murder in the 1960 Nero Wolfe story Poison à la Carte,

== See also ==
- Eating clubs at Princeton University
- Final clubs at Harvard
- Gentlemen's club
- Stanford Eating Clubs
- Supper club
