= The Army Quarterly and Defence Journal =

Journal

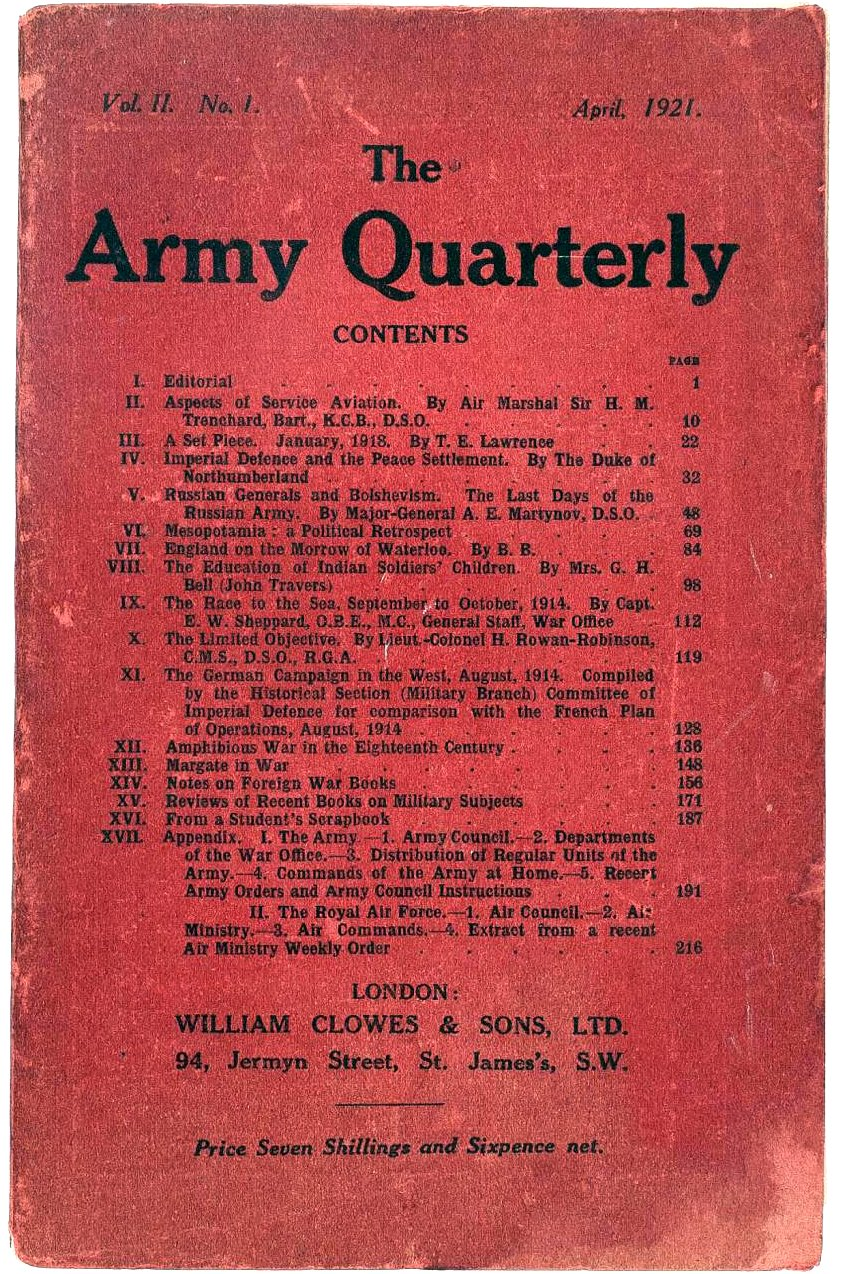
- Categories: Military history
- Frequency: Quarterly
- Founder: Guy Dawnay, Cuthbert Headlam
- First issue: October 1920
- Final issue: July 1999
- Country: United Kingdom
- ISSN: 0004-2552
- OCLC: 2338035

The Army Quarterly and Defence Journal was a British defence journal established in 1920 by Guy Dawnay and Cuthbert Headlam, both former British Army officers, as The Army Quarterly. It was known colloquially as the "AQ" and incorporated The United Service Magazine that was established in 1829.

Its early contributors included T. E. Lawrence (Lawrence of Arabia), Hugh Trenchard, and Basil Liddell-Hart as well as junior officers, and later it acted as a conduit for the dissemination of British Army orthodoxy among the armies of the British Empire, and as a forum for the discussion and questioning of British defence policy among the military of former colonies.

Discussion of the failures and successes of the First World War gave way to articles about guerrilla warfare and counterinsurgency after the Second World War and then to the concerns of the Cold War and nuclear age. Supplements were published titled The Army Quarterly Series and describing the defence forces of individual countries. It ceased publication in 1999.

== History ==
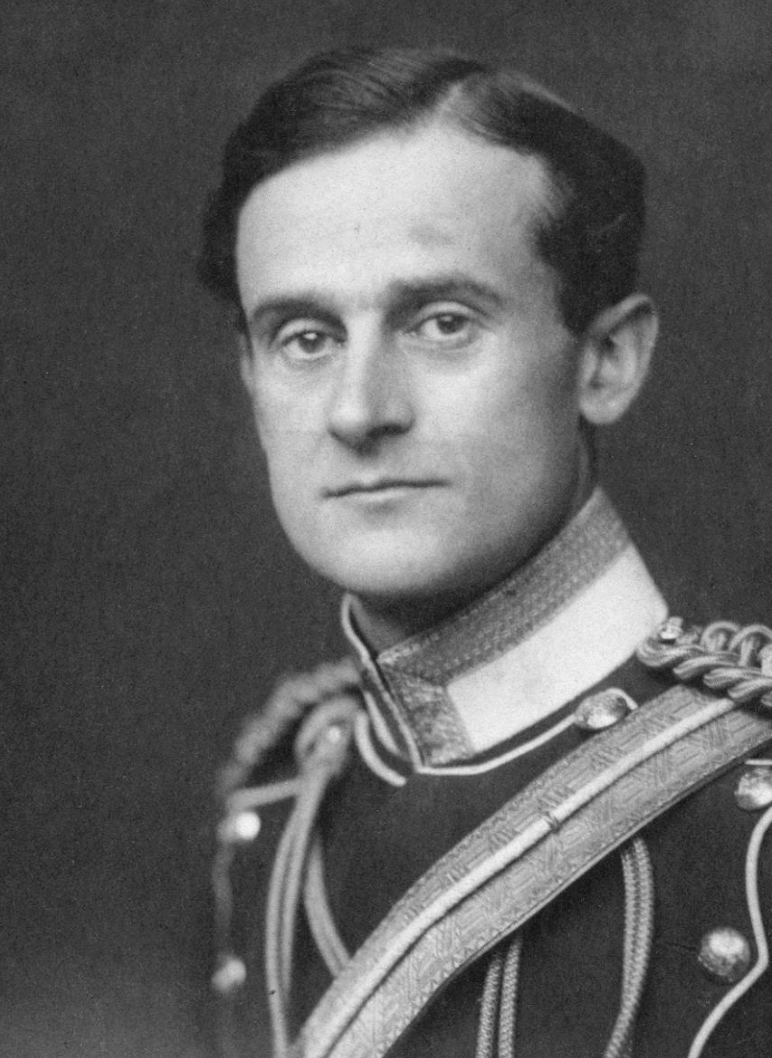
Cuthbert Headlam, co-founder and later editor of The Army Quarterly

The journal was established in 1920 as The Army Quarterly by Guy Dawnay and Cuthbert Headlam, both former British Army officers. During the First World War, Dawnay had served with the Egyptian Expeditionary Force and then in France, while Headlam had served on the Western Front and been awarded the DSO and OBE. He had revisited the field of conflict in 1919 and mused in his diary on "how futile it all was." It incorporated The United Service Magazine, formerly The United Service Journal and Naval and Military Magazine which ran until June 1920. The first edition was published by William Clowes & Sons, in October 1920 and it eventually became known colloquially as the "AQ".

The first editor was Guy Dawnay with Cuthbert Headlam as assistant editor but Headlam did most of the work despite later being elected a member of Parliament and then obtaining a cabinet position. He subsequently appointed his brother as editor in order to avoid an apparent conflict of interest, while continuing in reality to edit the journal himself.

Initially, the journal was not as profitable as had been hoped and Headlam came to tire of the regular deadlines and the poor quality of the writing of many military officers. The publication did, however, give him standing in the defence world and in time became semi-official, although it never received any grants from the British government. Headlam retired from his military position in the Yeomanry in 1926 and his generation began to move on or retire so that, according to Jim Beach, by the start of the Second World War, the journal had become associated with the outdated views of retired officers parodied by David Low in his "Colonel Blimp" character. In 1941, Headlam was replaced as editor by major-general Robert Collins.

The title was changed to The Army Quarterly and Defence Journal in 1958. It ceased publication in July 1999.

== Content ==
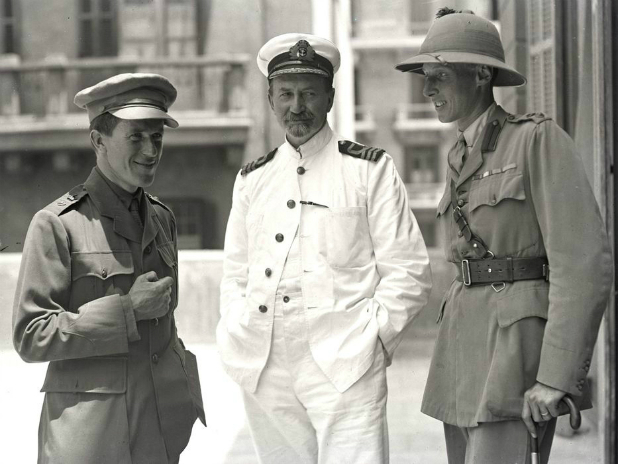
T. E. Lawrence (left), D. G. Hogarth (centre), and Guy Dawnay (right) at the Arab Bureau, Cairo, May 1918

The journal included a mixture of historical and topical articles, book reviews, advertisements, and notices. Among the articles dealing with recent events in the first issues were T. E. Lawrence (Lawrence of Arabia)'s "Evolution of a Revolt" (October 1920) and his April 1921 article "A Set Piece. January 1918". Also in April 1921, Hugh Trenchard wrote on "Aspects of Service Aviation" and major general A. E. Martynov wrote on "Russian Generals and Bolshevism. The Last Days of the Russian Army." Other contributors included J. F. C. Fuller, Herbert Richmond, and Basil Liddell-Hart.

The journal received contributions from all ranks of officers with the lessons to be learned from the First World War a subject of much debate. The annual essay competition provided plenty of suggestions for military reform which, due to the semi-official nature of the journal, could sometimes embarrass the British government where those suggestions criticised other countries. It was a forum for the exchange of views between different parts of the British Empire and the dissemination of the latest British Army orthodoxy as taught at the staff college. Extracts from the journal and similar British publications would sometimes appear in the Canadian Defence Quarterly between the wars as the Canadians absorbed the latest developments in British military thinking. The Australians, lacking an equivalent journal at home, were able to ponder the question of how committed Britain was to the defence of the empire if Britain itself was threatened and a number of Australian officers published articles in the AQ before the Second World War unsuccessfully arguing for greater Australian self-reliance in defence matters.

After the Second World War, articles relating to guerrilla warfare and counterinsurgency began to appear and in the 1950s the Cold War and the prospect of nuclear conflict informed the publication of a series of supplements titled The New Warfare (1953), N.A.T.O. and its Prospects (1954), and Arms and Tomorrow (1955) which featured on the cover a mushroom cloud rising from a bombed city.

== Abstracting and indexing ==
The journal is abstracted and indexed in America: History and Life, Historical Abstracts Part A Modern History Abstracts and Part B Twentieth Century Abstracts; Predicasts, and the Public Affairs Information Service Bulletin.

Editions until 1983 are available from Gale in microform.

== Editors ==
This list may not be complete.

- Major-General.Guy Dawnay
- Lieutenant-Colonel Cuthbert Headlam
- Major-General Robert Collins 1941-?
- Brigadier C. N. Barclay 1950-1966
- Major-General Robert Goldsmith
- Major-General C. H. Stainforth
- T. D. Bridge

== Supplements ==
A number of supplements were published by William Clowes & Sons in the 1950s under the title The Army Quarterly Series:

- The New Warfare by C. N. Barclay, 1953. (Reprinted Greenwood Press, 1983)
- N.A.T.O. and its Prospects by J. D. Warne, 1954. (Published in the United States by Praeger, New York, 1954)
- Arms and Tomorrow by Ian Harvey, 1955.

Later, there was a series titled The Defence Forces of...:

- The Defence Forces of Finland (1974)
- The Defence Forces of Switzerland (1974) (Ed. J. D. Lunt)
- The Defence Forces of Austria (1975) (Ed. C. H. Stainforth & J. D. Lunt)
- The Defence Forces of Sweden (1975)
- The Defence Forces of Australia (1977)
- The Defence Forces of Norway (1992) (Ed. T. D. Bridge & A. K. Slade) ISBN 9780904066272
