= Fellowship of the Knights of the Round Table of King Arthur =

International social organization

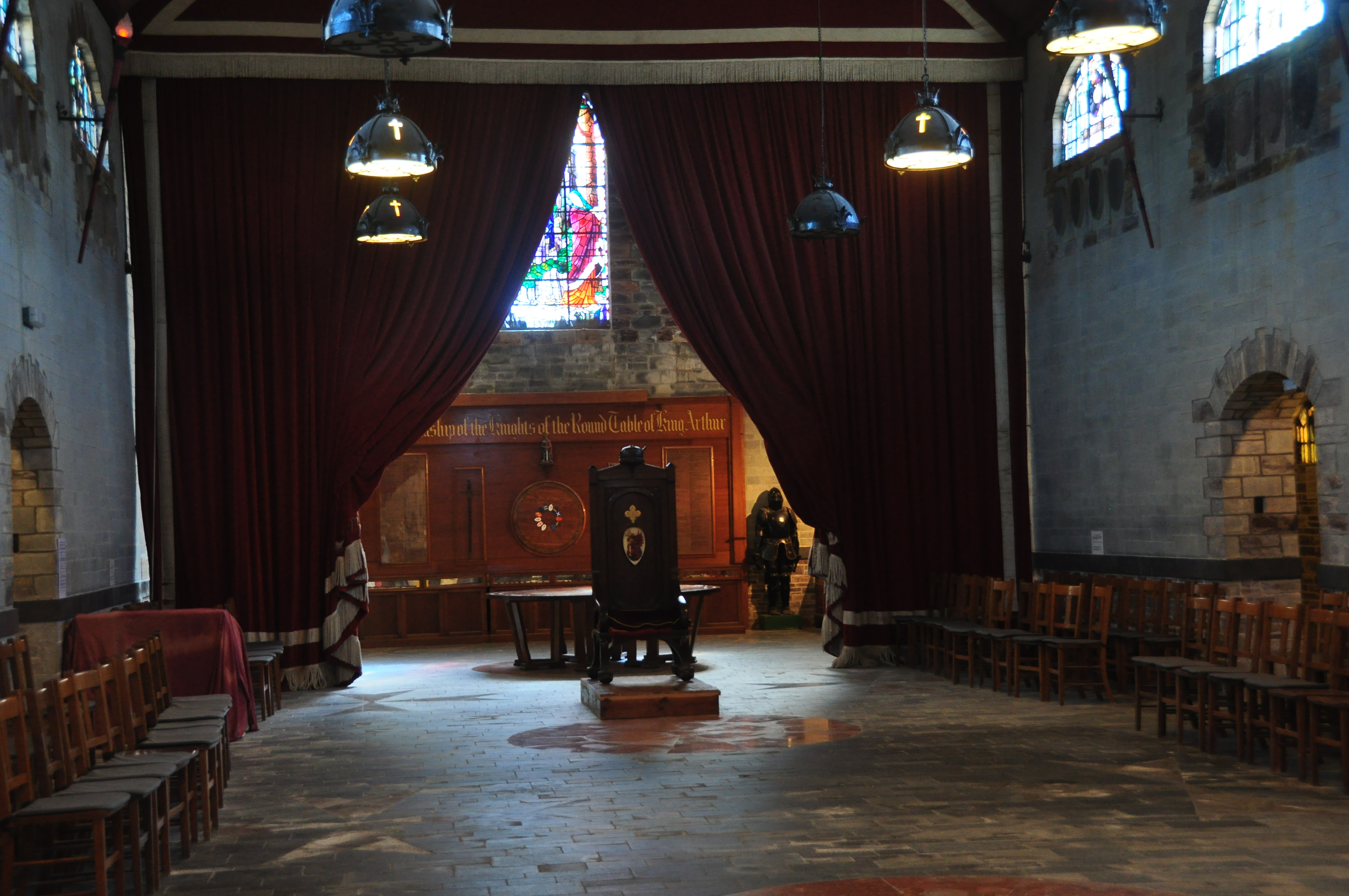
- Round Table at King Arthur's Great Halls
- Nickname: Order of the Fellowship
- Founded: 1927; 99 years ago
- Founder: Frederick Thomas Glasscock
- Type: Chivalric and charitable society
- Headquarters: King Arthur's Great Halls, Tintagel, Cornwall, England
- Knight-Seneschal: Roland Rotherham
- Website: thefellowship.co.uk

The Fellowship of the Knights of the Round Table of King Arthur (also known as the Order of the Fellowship) is a non-sectarian chivalric society founded in 1927 by Frederick Thomas Glasscock to promote Arthurian ideals of equality, brotherhood, chivalry, and charity. It is headquartered at King Arthur's Great Halls in Tintagel, Cornwall, which Glasscock built in the early 1930s as the society's permanent home.

The fellowship holds ceremonies at its granite Round Table and supports children's charities and Arthurian heritage preservation.

== History ==
Frederick Thomas Glasscock (1871–1934), a retired custard manufacturer and Freemason, founded the fellowship in 1927 in London before relocating it to Tintagel, Cornwall. According to the organization's tradition, Glasscock was a member of an 18th-century London-based "Knights of the Round Table," formed by descendants of King Edward III's short-lived 14th-century order, and founded the modern fellowship as a revival to make it more inclusive.

The society originally promoted Arthurian chivalry, with membership reaching over 17,000 by the early 1930s, including international branches in Australia and Canada. Glasscock was sailing to the United States in 1934 to found a branch of the fellowship but died on the voyage. The fellowship became dormant during World War II, and was revived in 1993. According to its own tradition, the fellowship claims continuity with an 18th-century London society and a 14th-century order founded by King Edward III.

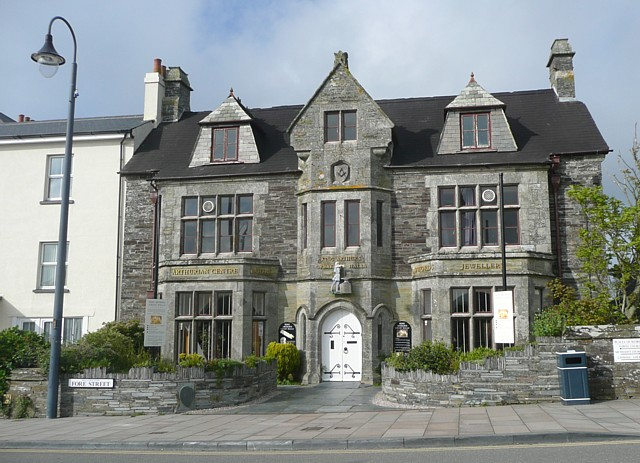
King Arthur's Great Halls

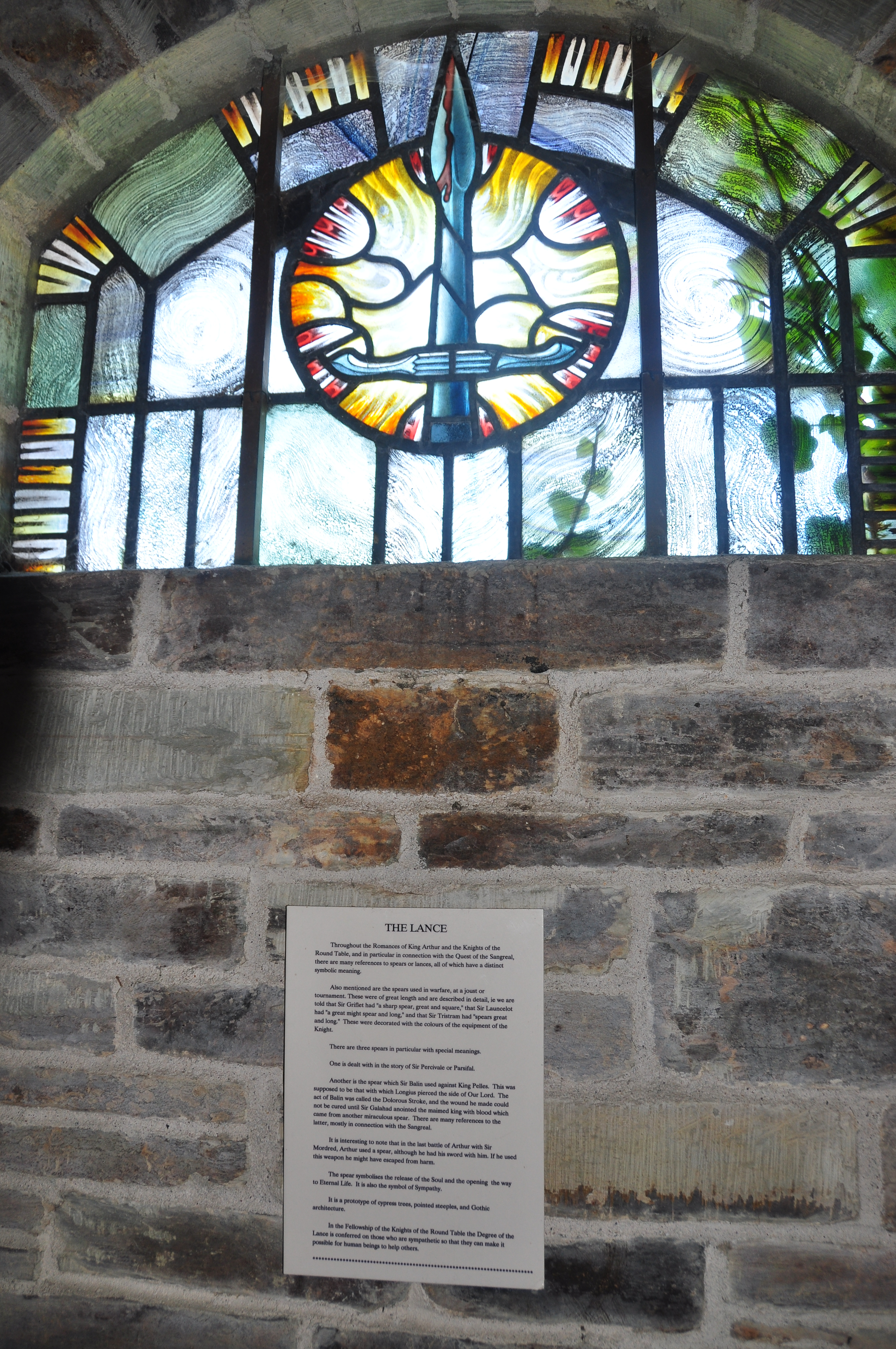
Veronica Whall's stained-glass windows in King Arthur's Great Halls

== Hall ==
Glasscock constructed King Arthur's Great Halls (opened 1933) as its headquarters, featuring a granite Round Table and 72 stained-glass windows by Veronica Whall. The fellowship became dormant during World War II, the building was transferred to Freemasons in the 1950s.

== Leadership and structure ==
The fellowship is governed by officers defined in its constitution. The current Knight-Seneschal (head) is Professor Sir Roland "Roly" Rotherham, an Arthurian historian and lecturer. Key roles include Knight Chamberlain, Knight Bursar, and regional Chapter Knights.

To support its international membership, the fellowship appoints regional officers, including a Knight Chamberlain for the United Kingdom and a Knight Chamberlain for the European Union.

== Activities and ceremonies ==
The Fellowship holds two formal annual dinners with investitures:

- The main dinner on the first Saturday in June at Tintagel (with oath renewal).
- The European dinner on the last Sunday in November at Kasteel de Berckt in Baarlo, Limburg, Netherlands.

Both events are conducted in a formal setting, featuring feasts, toasts, and chivalric rituals. The fellowship also supports children's charities and hosts lectures on Arthurian themes.

== Related organizations ==
The fellowship shares thematic similarities with other Arthurian-inspired societies but has no direct historical connection. These include the Honourable Society of Knights of the Round Table, a British group founded in 1720 by actors, artists, and literary figures to perpetuate the ideals of King Arthur, which meets at the Lansdowne Club in Mayfair and supports youth awards through its Benevolent Fund.
