= Eric Girdwood =

British Army general (1876–1963)

Major-General Sir Eric Girdwood KBE CB CMG
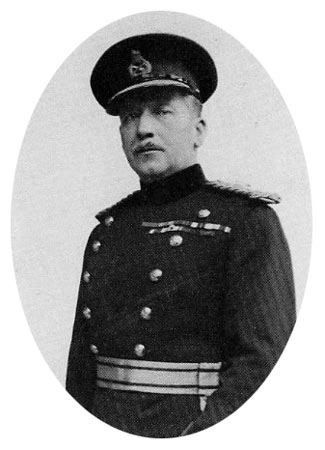
- Born: 14 October 1876; Strandtown, Belfast, Ireland
- Died: 24 May 1963 (aged 86); Towcester, Northamptonshire, England
- Military career
- Allegiance: United Kingdom
- Branch: British Army
- Service years: 1896–1935
- Rank: Major-General
- Service number: 24750
- Units: Cheshire Regiment; Cameronians (Scottish Rifles)
- Commands: Northern Ireland District; Royal Military College, Sandhurst; Bombay District; British Military Forces in Iraq; 3rd Division; 9th Infantry Brigade; 74th (Yeomanry) Division; 156th (Scottish Rifles) Brigade
- Conflicts: Second Boer War; First World War
- Awards: Knight Commander of the Order of the British Empire; Companion of the Order of the Bath; Companion of the Order of St Michael and St George; Mentioned in dispatches

Major-General Sir Eric Stanley Girdwood, KBE, CB, CMG (14 October 1876 – 24 May 1963) was a British military officer who served as General Officer Commanding the Northern Ireland District from 1931 to 1935.

== Military career ==
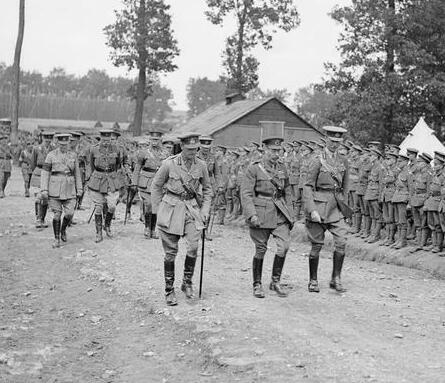
King George V with Major General Girdwood, GOC 74th (Yeomanry) Division, and Major General Thomas Lambert, GOC 32nd Division, during his visit to the Second Army, possibly La Brearde, 6 August 1918.

Educated at the Belfast Royal Academy, Girdwood was commissioned into the 4th (Militia) Battalion of the Cheshire Regiment in March 1896. before transferring into the Cameronians (Scottish Rifles), and the Regular Army, in May 1899.

He served in the Second Boer War in South Africa with the 2nd Battalion of his regiment. They took part in the Ladysmith relief force, including the battles of Colenso (December 1899), Vaal Krantz (February 1900) and the Tugela Heights (February 1900). During this advance, he was promoted to lieutenant on 25 January 1900. He served in the Natal from March to June 1900.

Following the end of the war, he left South Africa for England in July 1902. He was promoted to captain in January 1908.

Girdwood also served in the First World War, having been appointed a brigade major with the Scottish Rifles Brigade in 1911. He fought with his regiment at Gallipoli, and was in December 1915 appointed as an assistant quartermaster general, which carried with it the temporary rank of lieutenant colonel while so employed, He was promoted to brevet lieutenant colonel on 3 June 1916 "for Distinguished Service in the Field" and became commander of the 156th (Scottish Rifles) Brigade in Egypt and Palestine in July, when he was promoted to the temporary rank of brigadier general. He was made general officer commanding (GOC) of the 74th (Yeomanry) Division in Palestine and France later that year. He was appointed a Companion of the Order of the Bath in the 1918 Birthday Honours.

After the war Girdwood was appointed a Companion of the Order of St Michael and St George. He became commander of the 9th Infantry Brigade and then GOC 3rd Division in 1919. He was made commander of Military Forces in Iraq in 1924 and, after being made a substantive major general in June 1925, GOC Bombay District of India in 1926. He was appointed Commandant of the Royal Military College Sandhurst in 1927 and GOC Northern Ireland District in 1931; he relinquished this assignment on 17 September 1935 and retired from the army on the same date.

Military offices
Preceded by Charles Corkran	Commandant of the Royal Military College Sandhurst; 1927–1930	Succeeded by Reginald May
Preceded by Arthur Wauchope	General Officer Commanding the British Army in Northern Ireland; 1931–1935	Succeeded by James Cooke-Collis
