= Dawnay Day =

- Company type: Private
- Industry: other credit granting
- Founded: 1928; 97 years ago
- Founders: Major Julian Day; General Guy Dawnay
- Defunct: July 2008
- Headquarters: London

Dawnay Day was a privately owned financial services group. Founded in 1928, the London-based group, employed more than 1,000 employees and claimed to possess assets of more than $4-billion. Its offices were located in Europe, the Middle East, India, the US, and Australia.

== History ==
Dawnay Day can trace its history to 1928, when it was founded by Major Julian Day and General Guy Dawnay.

French financier Guy Naggar bought Dawnay Day in 1981. Dawnay Day went insolvent in July 2008.

== Investments ==
Dawnay Day bought German department store chain Hertie from Karstadt-Quelle (later Arcandor) in partnership with Hilco in 2005.. Dawnay Day held an 85% stake in Hertie, Hilco held 15%. Hertie filed for bankruptcy on May 20, 2009 since Dawnay Day could not support it any further due to its own dire financial situation. The liquidator of Hertie claimed the department store chain got into difficulties due to improperly high rent payments to the real estate owners, however as seen in the case of Arcandor's bankruptcy in June 2009, the whole German department store sector experienced severe difficulties during these times.

== Opposition ==
Dawnay Day has been criticized and opposed for its purchase of 47 apartment buildings in East Harlem where it has attempted to gentrify the area and make rents unaffordable to current low-income residents. The gentrification of the area and removal of current renters has been opposed by the tenants based Movement for Justice in el Barrio.
