= Steve Eaves =

Welsh poet, songwriter and singer

Steve Eaves (born 1952) is a Welsh poet, songwriter and singer, working in the Welsh language. He has lived for most of his life in the Bangor area of North Wales. He has been a performing musician for over 45 years.

During the late 1960s and early 1970s he worked as a labourer and musician, with frequent forays to Chester, Crewe and other locations to perform at folk clubs and underground venues of the period. He also performed at the Les Cousins folk club in Soho, sharing the floor spot with legendary blues singer Jo Ann Kelly. He also performed with various 'underground' musicians of the time such as Al Stewart, Tea and Symphony, and the Sutherland Brothers.

During the early 1970s, he graduated in Welsh and French at the University of Lampeter, joined the 16' Club and gained literacy skills in Welsh. He came to prominence in the early 1980s, with the publication of two volumes of poetry – mainly written in free verse – Noethni in 1983 and Jazz yn y nos three years later. In the same period, he began to apply his poetry to music, performing as a singer and guitarist, initially with his Triawd (Trio), which evolved into his current backing group, Rhai Pobl (Some People). The influence of the Blues is very significant in both his poetic and musical style. Jazz, folk and rock are also cited as musical influences. His band has always included some of the most talented musicians on the Welsh language music scene, and currently includes Eaves' long-time collaborator, multi-instrumentalist Elwyn Williams, drummer Gwyn 'Maffia' Jones, double bassist Pete Walton and eminent folk musician Stephen Rees, as well as Eaves' daughter, Manon Steffan Ros. The late poet Iwan Llwyd was the band's bassist for some twenty years. Allusions to Christianity, Taoism and left-wing political activism are frequent in his lyrics, the latter a reflection of his earlier involvement in the radical Welsh language movement Cymdeithas yr Iaith Gymraeg and the Welsh Socialist Republican Movement. His 2007 album Moelyci, recorded over a six-year period, largely deals with his reaction to the death of his wife, Siân. To date, he has released ten albums and two volumes of poetry.

Eaves' eldest daughter, Lleuwen, is an accomplished jazz singer, musician and composer in both Welsh and Breton. His youngest daughter, Manon Steffan Ros, is the author of over twenty children's books and three novels for adults, all in Welsh.

Eaves also works as an independent language planning consultant, focussing on the revitalization of Welsh. He holds two doctorates. The first is an honorary doctorate of the Open University (D.U., Open), awarded in 2014 in recognition of his ‘exceptional contribution to Welsh language and culture.’ The second is a PhD awarded by Cardiff University in 2015 for a thesis in Welsh, arguing for the key role of 'critical linguistic awareness' in the inclusive model of language planning currently pursued according to public policy in Wales.

== Bibliography ==
- Noethni (Nakedness), 1983 (Y Lolfa)
- Jazz yn y Nos (Jazz in the Night), 1986 (Y Lolfa)

== Discography ==
- Viva la Revolucion Galesa!, 1984
- Cyfalaf a chyfaddawd (Capital and Compromise), 1985 (Sain)
- Sbectol Dywyll (Dark Glasses), 1989 (Ankst)
- Tir Neb (No Man's Land), 1990 (In aid of Cymdeithas yr Iaith Gymraeg)
- Plant Pobl Eraill (Other Peoples' Children) 1991 (Ankst)
- Croendenau (Thin-skinned), 1992 (Ankst)
- Y Canol Llonydd Distaw (The Still, Silent Centre), 1996 (Ankst)
- Iawn (Alright), 2001 (Sain)
- Moelyci, 2007 (Sain)
- Ffoaduriaid (Refugees) 2011 (Sain)
- Y Dal yn Dynn, y Tynnu'n Rhydd (The holding on tightly, the letting go) 2019 (Sain)
