= University Tower (Durham, North Carolina) =

Skyscraper in Durham, North Carolina

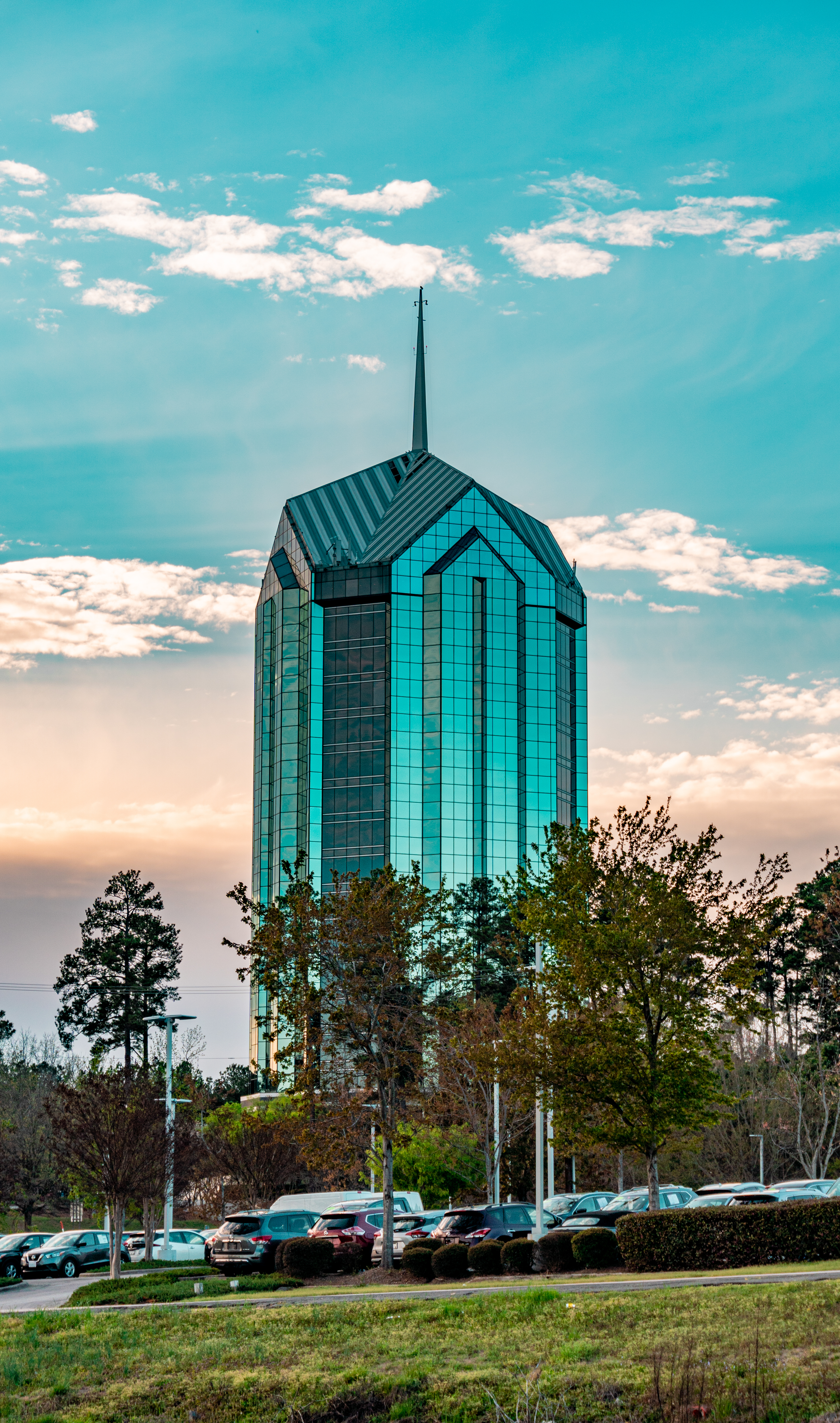
- University Tower in 2020
- Interactive map of the University Tower area

General information
- Status: Completed
- Type: Multiuse
- Location: 3100 Tower Blvd; Durham, North Carolina, USA
- Coordinates: 35.9716357°N 78.9592953°W
- Completed: 1982

Height
- Height: 356 feet (109 m)

Technical details
- Floor count: 17

Design and construction
- Developer: Tommy F. Stone

Website
- university-tower.com

University Tower is a 17-story skyscraper in Durham, North Carolina. The University Club, a members-only dining club, is located in the tower's penthouse. The tower is also locally known as The Pickle due to its greenish color. Standing at 356 feet (108.5 meters), it is the tallest building in Durham.

== History ==
Construction on University Tower began in 1985 by Texas-based developer Tommy F. Stone. The 184,969 square-foot-tower was completed in 1986. It stands at 356 feet, making it the tallest building in Durham.

University Tower includes seventeen stories of office space. The penthouse was home to the University Club Restaurant, a private members-only dining club.
