= C. N. Barclay =

British soldier and author (1896–1979)

Brigadier C. N. Barclay CBE DSO
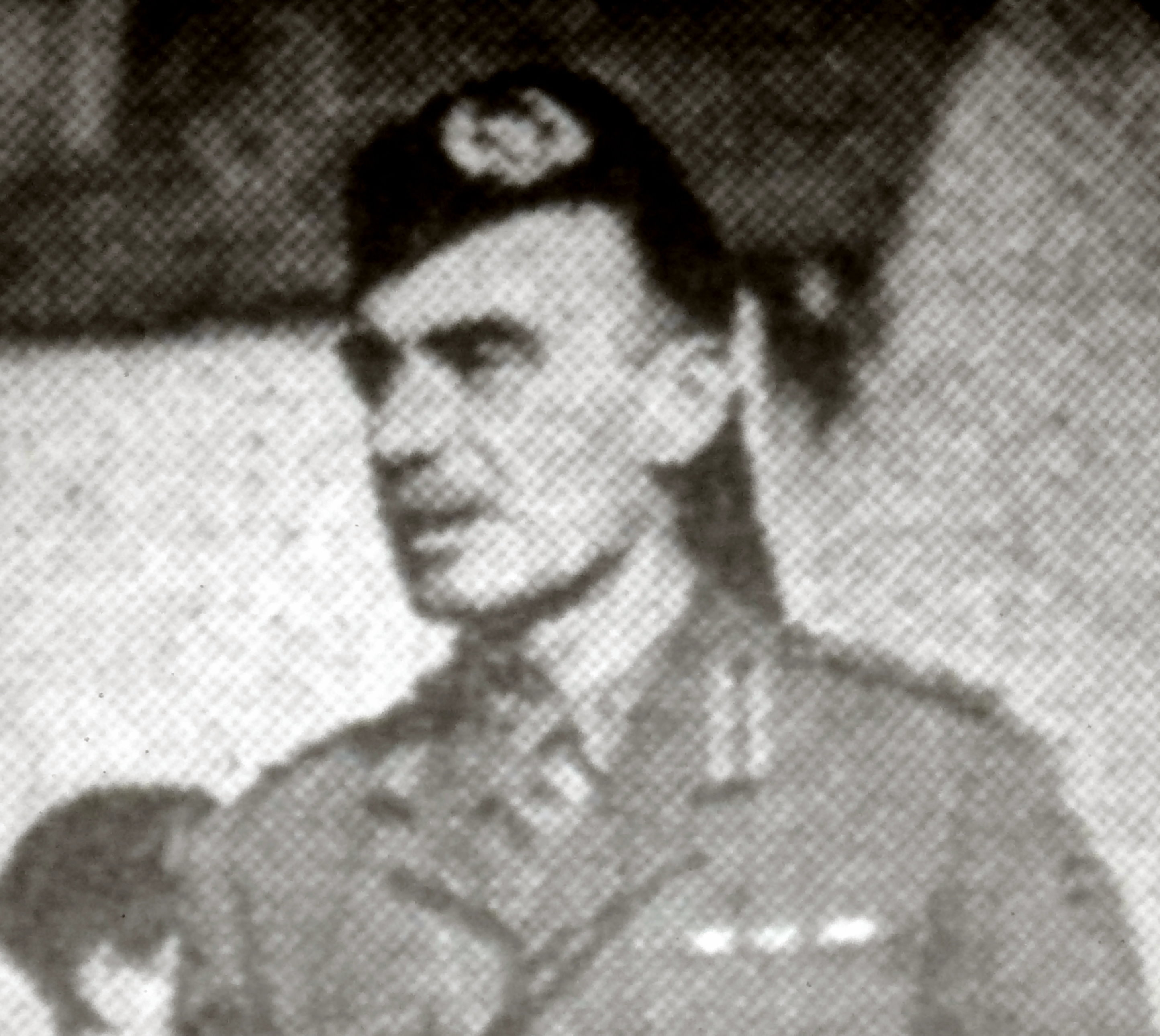
- Brigadier C. N. Barclay, pictured here in 1942
- Born: 20 January 1896; Dartford, Kent, England
- Died: 30 January 1979 (aged 83); London, England
- Education: Thanet College, Kent
- Military career
- Allegiance: United Kingdom
- Branch: British Army
- Service years: 1915–1946
- Rank: Brigadier
- Service number: 11785
- Unit: Cameronians (Scottish Rifles)
- Commands: 2nd Battalion, Cameronians (Scottish Rifles); 156th Infantry Brigade
- Conflicts: World War I Third Anglo-Afghan War; World War II
- Awards: Commander of the Order of the British Empire; Distinguished Service Order

Signature
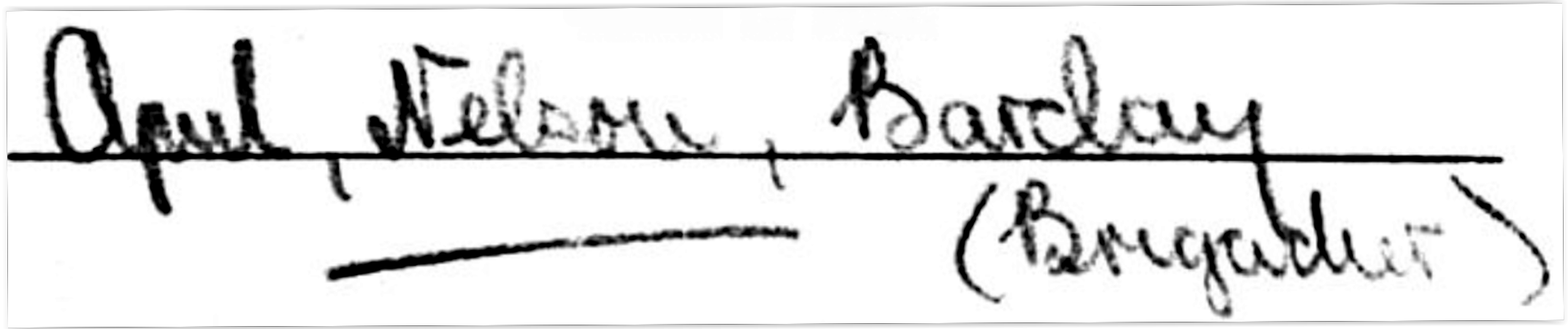

Brigadier Cyril Nelson Barclay CBE DSO (20 January 1896 – 30 January 1979) was a British soldier, editor, and author. He served with the Cameronians (Scottish Rifles) in two World Wars, rising to the rank of brigadier, and after retiring from the army in 1946 was editor of The Army Quarterly and Defence Journal from 1950 to 1966, co-editor of Brassey's Annual: The Armed Forces Year Book from 1950 to 1969, and contributed articles to encyclopedias and periodicals.

He wrote a number of regimental and unit histories and other non-fiction books on military subjects such as The New Warfare (1953) which dealt with the emerging Cold War, which he predicted would continue for many years, and addressed topics such as proxy warfare between the eastern and western power blocs.

Reviewers approved of his careful judgements and even-handed approach such as in his account of British military leadership in the early years of the Second World War, On their Shoulders (1964), which used an insider's view to explain some of the possible causes of early British failures. His last books, Battle 1066 (1966) about the Battle of Hastings, and Armistice 1918 (1968) about the end of the First World War, were workmanlike military history books published on the anniversaries of those events.

== Early life and family ==
Cyril Barclay was born in Dartford, Kent, on 20 January 1896, the only son of Edward John Barclay. He was educated at Elstow School, Bedfordshire, and Thanet College, St Peter's, Kent. He married Margaret Roberts in Lucknow, India, in 1934 (died 1976) with whom he had one daughter.

== Military career ==
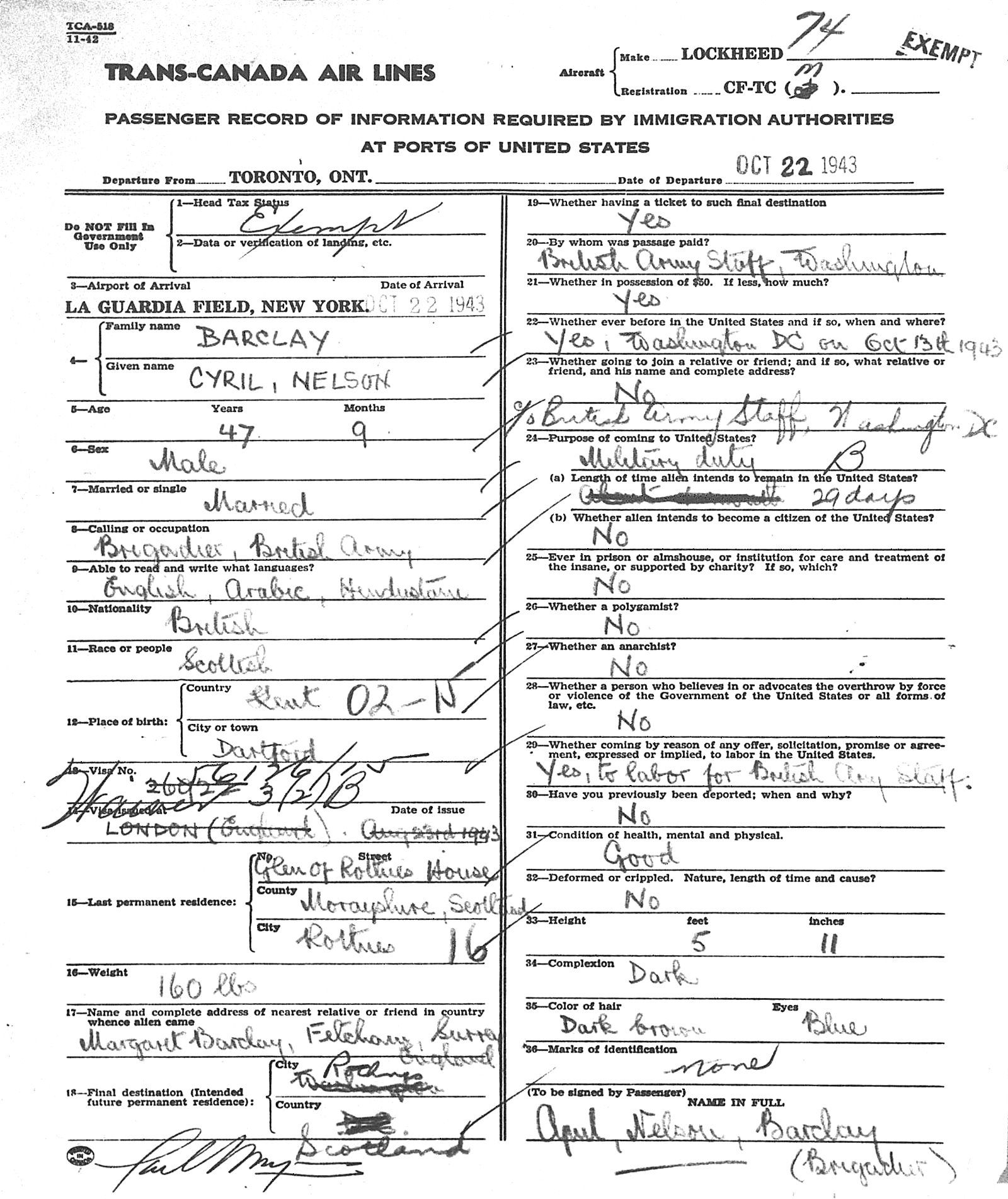
Trans Canada Airlines passenger record for C. N. Barclay, 1943

Barclay was commissioned in the Cameronians (Scottish Rifles) in January 1916 and served in France and Mesopotamia during the First World War. He also served in the 3rd Afghan War in 1919 and in India in the 1930s. He attended the Staff College, Camberley from 1930 to 1931. In 1939, he won the Bertrand Stewart Essay Prize.

During the Second World War, he was at Dunkirk and served in Holland, Germany and South-East Asia. He visited the United States twice in 1943 in the course of his duties, describing himself as Scottish but born in Dartford, Kent, and able to read and write English, Arabic, and Hindustani. His last permanent address was given as Glen of Rothies House, Morayshire, Scotland. He was awarded the Distinguished Service Order (DSO) in 1940 "for gallant and distinguished services in action in connection with recent operations" and was made a Commander of the Order of the British Empire (CBE) in 1945 for service in north-west Europe. He retired in 1946 with the rank of brigadier. He was a member of the Army and Navy Club.

== Writing ==
After he retired from the army, Barclay was editor of The Army Quarterly and Defence Journal (the AQ) from 1950 to 1966, and co-editor of Brassey's Annual: The Armed Forces Year Book from 1950 to 1969, producing articles for both publications. He wrote eight regimental and unit histories and a number of other non-fiction works on military subjects. He contributed to Encyclopædia Britannica, Chambers's Encyclopedia, The New York Times Magazine, Army magazine (USA), Military Review, and Encyclopedia Americana amongst others.

In 1953 he published The New Warfare in association with the AQ in which he discussed the nature of the stand-off between the West and the Soviet Union after the end of the Second World War, now commonly known as the Cold War. He described a "new warfare", characterised by propaganda, clandestine activity, threats, and proxy wars rather than the open warfare of earlier eras, and thought that the death of Joseph Stalin, which had recently occurred, had resulted only in a change of Soviet methods and that the tension between the two blocs would probably continue for many years. The book was published in London by William Clowes and Sons in 1953, in New York by The Philosophical Library, and reprinted by Greenwood Press in the United States in 1983.

Stephen Longrigg in International Affairs appreciated the workmanlike way that Barclay told the story in Against Great Odds: The story of the first offensive in Libya in 1940-41 (1955), with "little room for, or inclination to, jeux d'espirit or literary fireworks".

In 1964, The Economist praised Barclay's study of British military leadership in the early part of the Second World War, On their Shoulders. British generalship in the lean years, 1939-1942, for its even-handed and un-dogmatic approach. The magazine felt that Barclay's careful judgements, which contrasted with some less objective works, avoided the lionisation of the successful and the damning of those who failed, and in his comments on British Army training deficiencies, helped to explain some of the early military failures during the war.

His Battle 1066 was published in 1966 to mark the 900th anniversary of the Battle of Hastings and gave an account of the events that led to the battle and an account of its course in his view. The cover was designed by Eric Fraser.

His last book was Armistice 1918, published by Dent in 1968 to mark the fiftieth anniversary of the armistice at the end of the First World War. Like Battle 1066 it gives an account of the events leading up to the event, and a detailed account of the armistice itself with the first printing in one place of the Fourteen Points, the Armistice Agreement, and the Peace Treaty. The dust jacket features an image of the fighting while the front boards reproduce a line drawing of The Cenotaph in London's Whitehall with draped flags.

== Death ==
Cyril Barclay died in London, England, on 30 January 1979.

== Selected publications ==
=== Regimental and unit histories ===
- The History of the Royal Northumberland Fusiliers in the Second World War. William Clowes & Sons, London, 1952.
- The London Scottish in the Second World War 1939 to 1945 &c. William Clowes & Sons, London, 1952.
- The History of the Duke of Wellington's Regiment 1919-1952 &c. William Clowes & Sons for the Regimental Council, the Duke of Wellington's Regiment, 1953.
- The Regimental History of the 3rd Queen Alexandra's Own Gurkha Rifles. Volume II, 1927 to 1947. Compiled under the direction of the Regimental History Committee, 3rd Q.A.O. Gurkha Rifles. William Clowes & Sons, London, 1953. (Editor)
- The First Commonwealth Division. The story of British Commonwealth land forces in Korea, 1950-1953. Gale & Polden, Aldershot, 1954.
- The History of the 53rd, Welsh, Division in the Second World War. William Clowes & Sons, London, 1956.
- The History of the Sherwood Foresters, Nottinghamshire and Derbyshire Regiment, 1919-1957. William Clowes & Sons, London, 1959.
- History of the 16th/5th The Queen's Royal Lancers, 1925 to 1961. Gale & Polden, London, 1963.

=== Other ===
- Part-Time Farmer. An introduction to agriculture as a part-time occupation, &c. Sifton Praed, London, 1948.
- The New Warfare. William Clowes & Sons, London, 1953. (Reprinted Greenwood Press, 1983)
- Against Great Odds: The story of the first offensive in Libya in 1940-41 - the first British victory in the Second World War. Sifton Praed, London, 1955.
- On their Shoulders. British generalship in the lean years, 1939-1942. Faber and Faber, London, 1964.
- Battle 1066. Dent, London, 1966.
- Armistice 1918. Dent, London, 1968.
