= Stanford Eating Clubs =

The Stanford Eating Clubs, also known as the Toyon [Hall] Eating Clubs, were founded in 1892, making them the oldest student-managed group on the Stanford University campus. Originally organized by students to provide much-needed meal services during the initial years of the University, they quickly became hubs for social activities. From their inception, the all-male eating clubs had become an alternative to the fraternity system, accepting students who were ineligible for membership in the fraternities for racial or religious reasons, e.g. Asians, Hispanics, and Jews. In the 2009-2010 academic year, after a history of 117 years, the University administration abolished the eating clubs. A new dining hall, "Linx," was established in their place, and Toyon residents were merged into the campus meal plan system. The club used to be near the Toyon hall in an L-shaped building and hence the name, Toyon Eating Club.

== The Search for New Facilities ==
Although the clubs had a strong, enthusiastic membership, their challenge to secure a new site where their social purpose of inclusion and independence could continue was thwarted.

== Student Management Training ==
The Stanford eating clubs provided an excellent training ground for student managers. Each club had two managers who collectively formed a board of directors; in turn board hired a general manager, financial manager, and social manager. In addition, each club's managers organized individual club events. In this environment, managers learned aspects of the business ranging from inventory and food cost control to staff management and special events planning.

== History: The First One Hundred Years ==
The Stanford eating clubs were a part of the Stanford tradition almost since the University's inception. Throughout their history, they saw many changes in location, size, and character, all the while remaining an integral part of the Stanford community. Although they were founded to provide a dining alternative for students, over the years the eating clubs developed into an organization of students looking for a sense of community without the enforced social or political agendas of other campus groups. This unique contribution to the student body is the reason the eating clubs survived decades of change, and why they possessed the potential to continue attracting students in the 21st century.

A concise history of the first fifty years of the Stanford eating clubs may be found in the 1963 Stanford Eating Clubs Rush Manual:

The Stanford Eating Clubs began before the turn of the [20th] century, formed by congenial bands of like minded men who were unhappy with the food and service offered by the University-sponsored Stanford Inn. Even before the first Club was formed, some students were eating at the mess hall of "The Camp," a crude barrack community built on the site of the student union. It was here, in 1894, that the first Club — Brookfarm Eating Club — was founded. Brookfarm lasted only one year, but it was a beginning, and the "eating club" concept continued to grow. Other co-operative eating groups were formed at "The Camp" and in nearby Palo Alto and Mayfield (now the California Avenue area of Palo Alto). "The Camp" was closed in 1902, but it didn't dampen the Club spirit, and the leading students of those days continued to trek off campus three times a day for their meals. In 1907 several of the Clubs with houses in College Terrace — Snell, Welakahao, Marchmount, and Entre Nous — banded together to form the Terrace Club. With one exception, these Clubs all subsequently disbanded. Entre Nous, however, founded in 1901, became the first of the seven present Clubs. The name was changed to Los Arcos in 1922. In 1909 Breakers Club was organized in a small cottage on Stanford Avenue near its intersection with Escondido Road. Breakers remained there for one year before moving to the Frenchman's House, located on Escondido Road. El Campo and El Toro were also founded in these early years of the century. In the fall of 1912 the "Little Quad" was completed and Breakers, El Campo, and El Toro moved into this small U-shaped building next to Encina Hall near the last Club building.

== Construction of the Present Building: The "L" ==
In 1920 Encina Commons was opened, with separate dining rooms for the clubs. The El Capitan and El Cuadro clubs were organized in 1921 and together with Los Arcos (the original four clubs, then still known as Entre Nous) moved to the Commons. The El Tigre club was organized in 1922 and shared a Commons room with El Capitan.

Until World War II there were three clubs in the Little Quad and four in Encina Commons. After the war, veterans returned to find the "Little Quad" had been condemned and demolished. Encina Commons was too crowded with freshmen to provide individual dining rooms for each club, so all seven clubs had to find space in the one large dining room of the Commons.

Faced with conditions they considered intolerable, the clubs began a concentrated effort to build their own facilities. They launched a fund drive that proved to be successful, and in 1951 the last club building was dedicated on Big Game day.

In their new location, referred to as "The L" due to its shape, the eating clubs took on a new dimension, becoming an integral part of the life of adjacent Toyon Hall. The Toyon residents, all male, were all club members, and the social and intellectual life of the dorm was next door in the dining rooms and lounges of the clubs. The eating clubs started many traditions, some becoming enduring legacies for the Stanford community as a whole. For instance, it was an El Toro member (and president of the Associated Students of Stanford University) who began the Axe tradition (the prize for winner — Stanford or Cal [the University of California, Berkeley] — of the annual football game between the two schools). The eating clubs by this point continued to be an important alternative to the exclusionary policies of the fraternity system. They explained their philosophy as follows:

Our uniqueness allows us to do our own thinking and planning. We have no one to imitate, no national affiliation to determine our traditions and policies. Our independence, even from University control, gives our members the chance they need and deserve to do with their talents as they wish [from the Stanford Eating Clubs President's Report, 1974].

== The Clubs Go Coed ==
Coeducational housing started on a limited scale at Stanford in 1966. When Toyon Hall became coed, the clubs chose to abandon their male-only policy and welcomed female members. The last eating club to become completely coed, in 1977, was El Toro. The membership policy of the clubs was intentionally designed to be egalitarian: on the first day of the academic quarter, a sheet was appended to the door of each club with the number of open positions; anyone wishing to join the club had merely to sign the sheet. This was in contrast to the process of "rushing" found in fraternities and sororities (although the term rush was employed by the clubs themselves; cf. the above-quoted 1963 Stanford Eating Clubs Rush Manual [emphasis added]).
