= Cameronians (Scottish Rifles) =

Infantry regiment of the British Army, 1881–1968

- Cap badge of the Cameronians (Scottish Rifles)
- Active: 1 July 1881 – 14 May 1968
- Country: United Kingdom
- Branch: British Army
- Type: Rifles
- Size: 2 Regular battalions 2 Militia battalions 2–4 Territorial and Volunteer battalions Up to 12 hostilities-only battalions
- Part of: Lowland Brigade
- Garrison/HQ: Hamilton Barracks, Hamilton (1881–1947); Winston Barracks, Lanark (1947–1964); Glencorse Barracks, Edinburgh (1964–1968)
- March: Quick – Within a mile of Edinburgh Toon; Slow – The Garb of Old Gaul

Commanders
- Colonel in Chief: HM King Gustaf VI Adolf
- Colonel of the Regiment: Major General Henry Templar Alexander, CB CBE DSO

Insignia
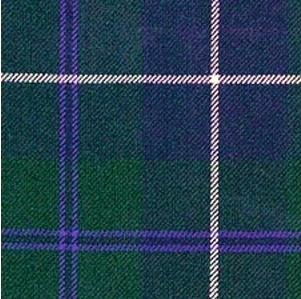
- Tartan

The Cameronians (Scottish Rifles) was a rifle regiment of the British Army, the only regiment of rifles amongst the Scottish regiments of infantry. It was formed in 1881 under the Childers Reforms by the amalgamation of the 26th Cameronian Regiment and the 90th Perthshire Light Infantry. In 1968, when reductions were required, the regiment chose to be disbanded rather than amalgamated with another regiment, one of only two infantry regiments in the British Army to do so, with the other being the York and Lancaster Regiment. It can trace its roots to that of the Cameronians, later the 26th of Foot, who were raised in 1689. The 1881 amalgamation coincided with the Cameronians' selection to become the new Scottish Rifles.

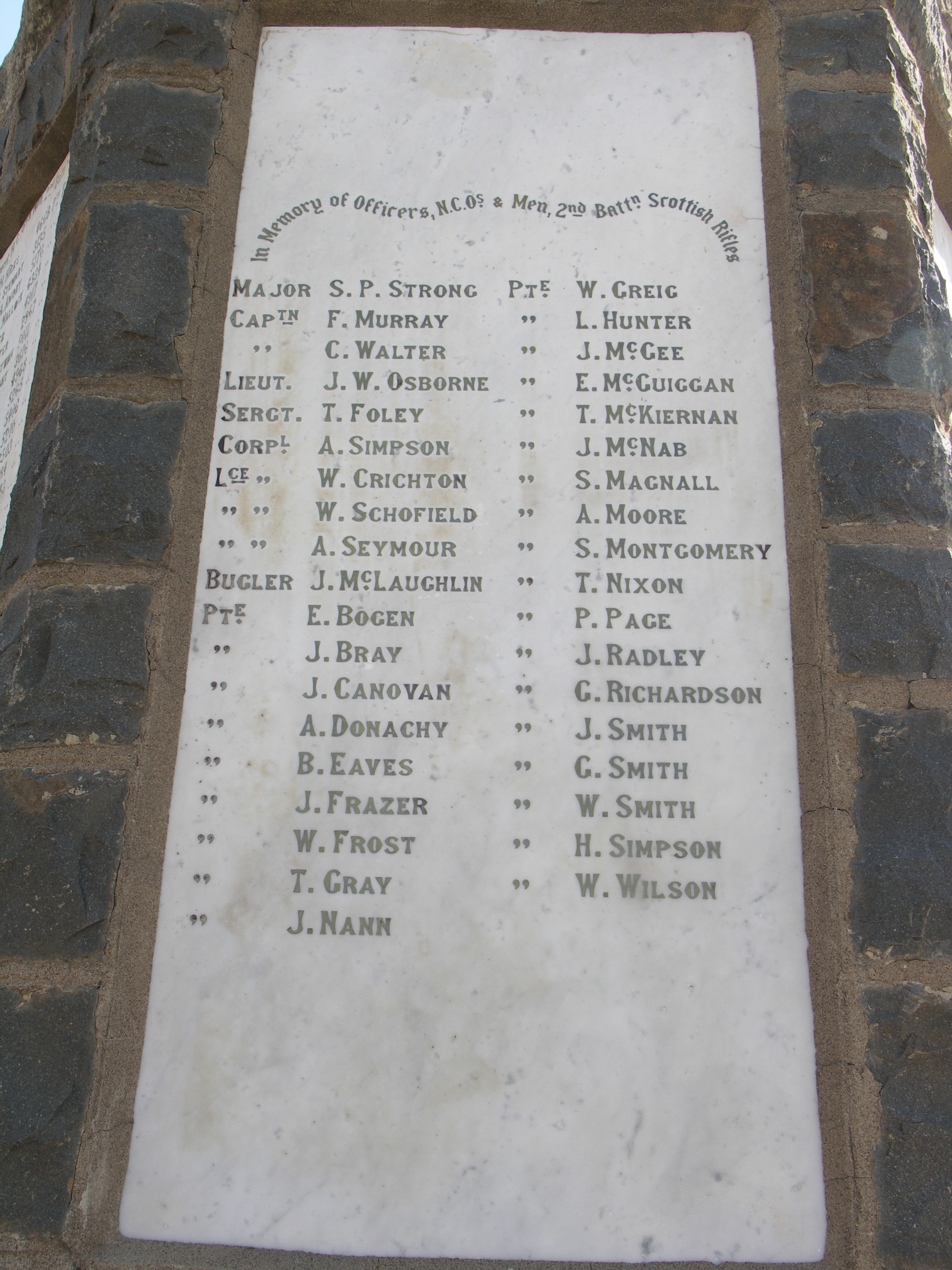
Memorial on Spion Kop

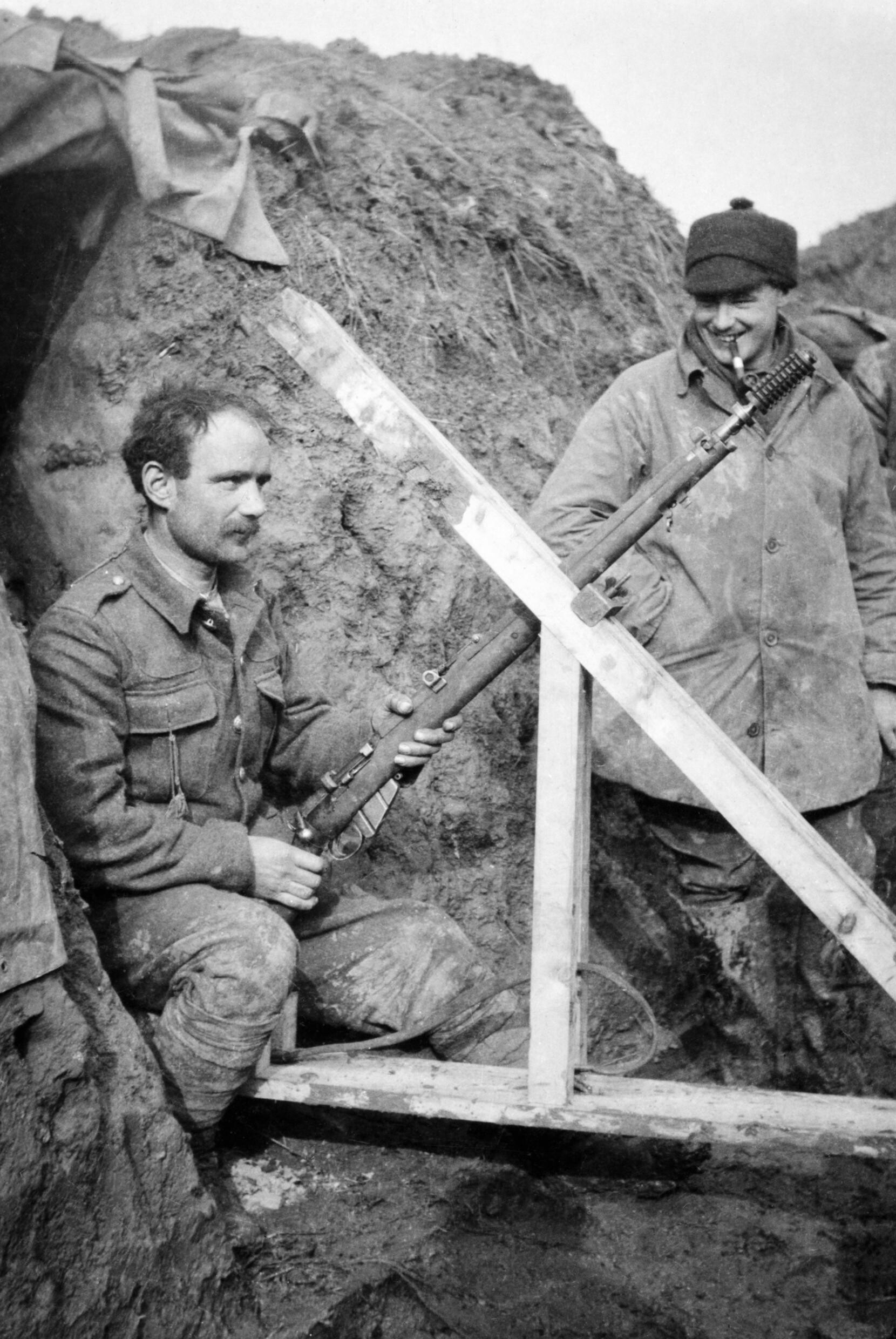
1st Battalion Cameronians (Scottish Rifles) on the Western Front, 1914/15

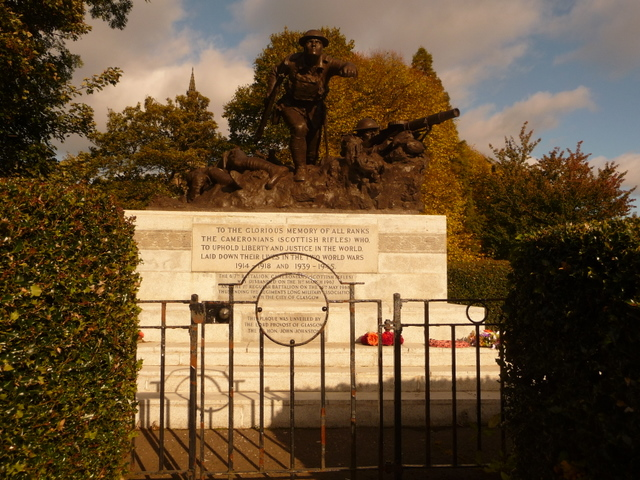
The Cameronians War Memorial in Kelvingrove Park

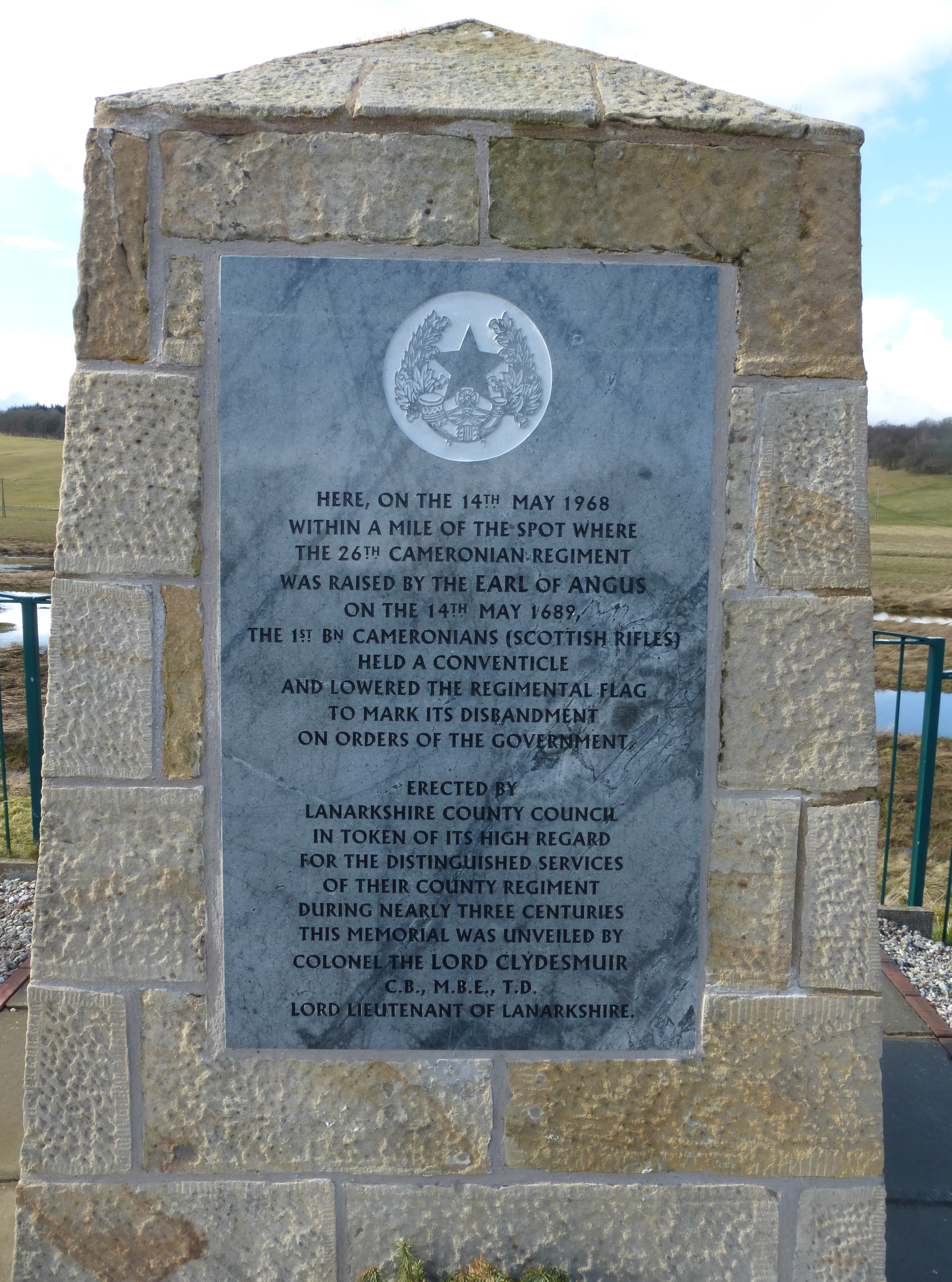
Cameronians Memorial at Douglas, South Lanarkshire

== History ==
=== Formation ===
The Cameronians (Scottish Rifles) was formed in 1881 under the Childers Reforms by the amalgamation of the 26th Cameronian Regiment and the 90th Perthshire Light Infantry.

=== Second Boer War ===
The 2nd Battalion saw action at the Battle of Spion Kop in January 1900 during the Second Boer War.

Two militia battalions were formed from the former 2nd Royal Lanark Militia. The 3rd battalion was embodied in May 1900 for service during the Second Boer War. More than 600 men embarked for South Africa in April 1901, and returned in June 1902, following the end of hostilities. The 4th battalion had been embodied already in December 1899, also for service in the same war, and 600 officers and men embarked for South Africa in late February 1900. The battalion was stationed in Kimberley to assist in local defence from April 1900, after the city had been relieved from a siege two months earlier.

In 1908, the Volunteers and Militia were reorganised nationally, with the former becoming the Territorial Force and the latter the Special Reserve; the regiment now had two Reserve and four Territorial battalions.

=== First World War ===
==== Regular Army ====
The 1st Battalion landed at Le Havre as part of the 19th Brigade, which was an independent command at that time, in August 1914 for service on the Western Front. The battalion famously refused to play football or otherwise fraternise with the enemy on Christmas Day 1914. The 2nd Battalion landed in France as part of the 23rd Brigade in the 8th Division in November 1914 for service on the Western Front.

==== Territorial Force ====
The 1/5th Battalion was one of the first Territorial Force units selected to reinforce the Regulars of the British Expeditionary Force (BEF) in France. It landed at Le Havre on 5 November 1914, joining 19th Brigade on 19 November. At this time 19th Bde also included 1st Bn Cameronians (Note: The 33rd Division's historian usually refers to 1st Bn as 'Cameronians' and 5th Bn as 'Scottish Rifles', which may reflect the battalions' preferences as to titles; the Official Histories use Scottish Rifles for both.) 19th Brigade was attached to the 6th Division; later it moved to 33rd Division, a 'Kitchener's Army' formation. The 1/6th Battalion landed at Le Havre as part of the 23rd Brigade in the 8th Division in March 1915 for service on the Western Front. It later joined 33rd Division and in 1916 it merged with the 1/5th to form 5th/6th Bn. The 1/7th Battalion and the 1/8th Battalion landed in Gallipoli as part of the 156th Brigade in the 52nd (Lowland) Division in June 1915; after evacuation from Gallipoli in January 1916 the battalions moved to Egypt and served in the Sinai and Palestine Campaign. They sailed to Marseille in April 1918 and served on the Western Front until the end of the war.

==== New Armies ====
The 9th (Service) Battalion landed at Boulogne-sur-Mer as part of the 27th Brigade in the 9th (Scottish) Division in May 1915 for service on the Western Front. The 10th (Service) Battalion landed at Boulogne-sur-Mer as part of the 46th Brigade in the 15th (Scottish) Division in July 1915 for service on the Western Front. The 11th (Service) Battalion landed at Boulogne-sur-Mer as part of the 77th Brigade in the 26th Division in September 1915 for service on the Western Front but sailed for Salonika in November 1915.

==== 1st Garrison Battalion ====
The 1st Garrison Battalion of the Cameronians was formed in Hamilton, Scotland in February 1916. The battalion sailed from Devonport aboard the SS Franconia, arriving in Bombay (Mumbai), India on 13 March 1916. They remained stationed in India for the remainder of World War I.

=== Inter-war ===
The 1st Battalion was deployed to Ireland in 1919 during the Irish War of Independence and then went to India in 1931 while the 2nd Battalion was deployed to Mesopotamia in 1919 and then went to India in 1922.

=== Second World War ===
The 1st Battalion, which had been in India at the start of the war and was initially commanded by Lieutenant Colonel Alexander Galloway, was deployed to Burma as part of the 1st Burma Brigade in the 39th Indian Division in 1942 and saw action in the Burma Campaign.

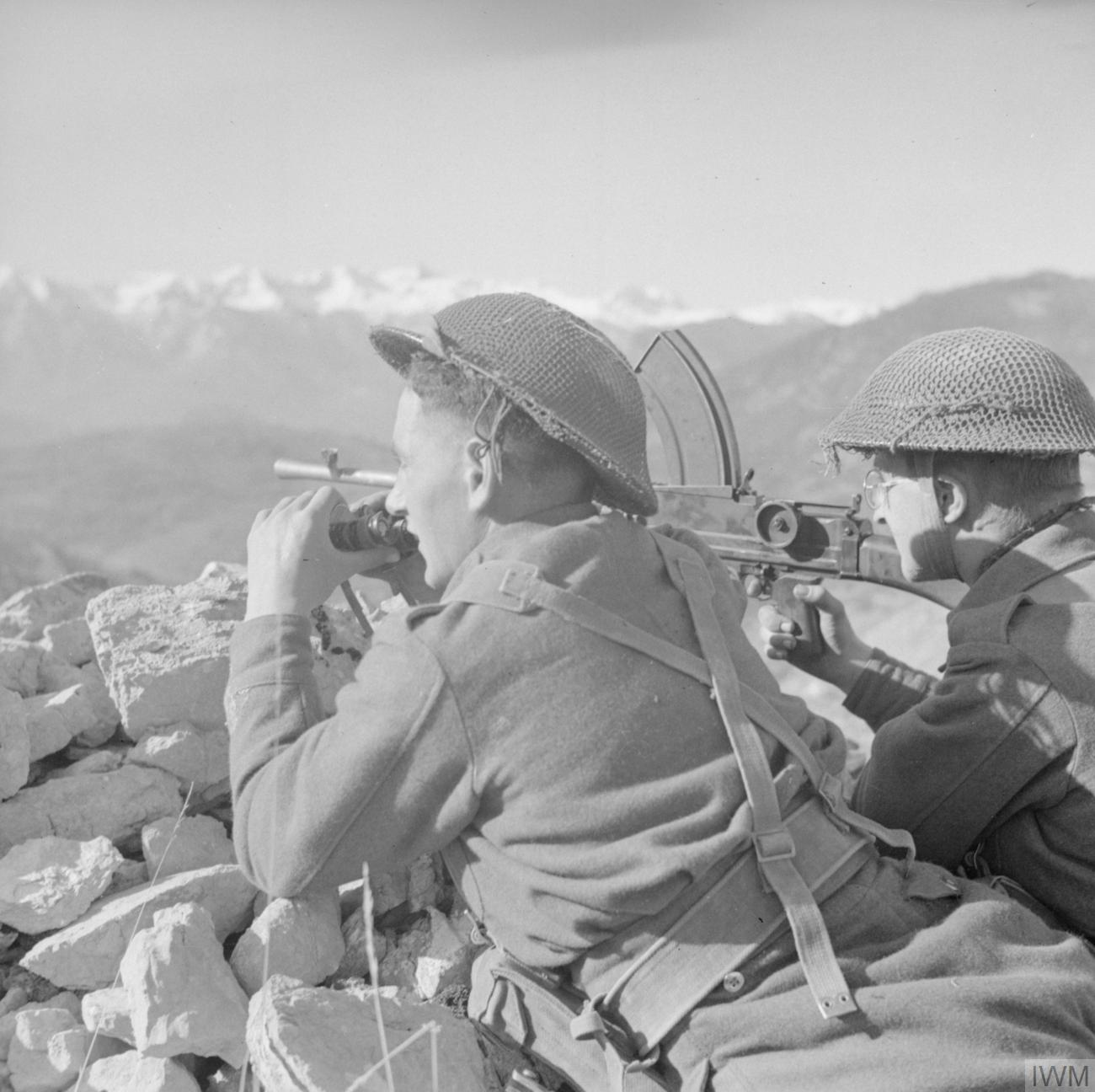
A Bren gun team from the 2nd Battalion, Cameronians (Scottish Rifles), 5th Division, take up a position high up in the mountains, Italy, 21 November 1943.

The 2nd Battalion, initially commanded by Lieutenant Colonel Douglas Graham, was deployed to France as part of the 13th Infantry Brigade in the 5th Division within the British Expeditionary Force (BEF) in September 1939 and, after taking part in the Dunkirk evacuation in June 1940, saw action in the Allied invasion of Sicily in July 1943 and the Allied invasion of Italy in September 1943 and, after fighting in the Italian Campaign, serving in both the Moro River and Anzio campaigns until July 1944, took part in the North West Europe Campaign in early 1945, ending in May.

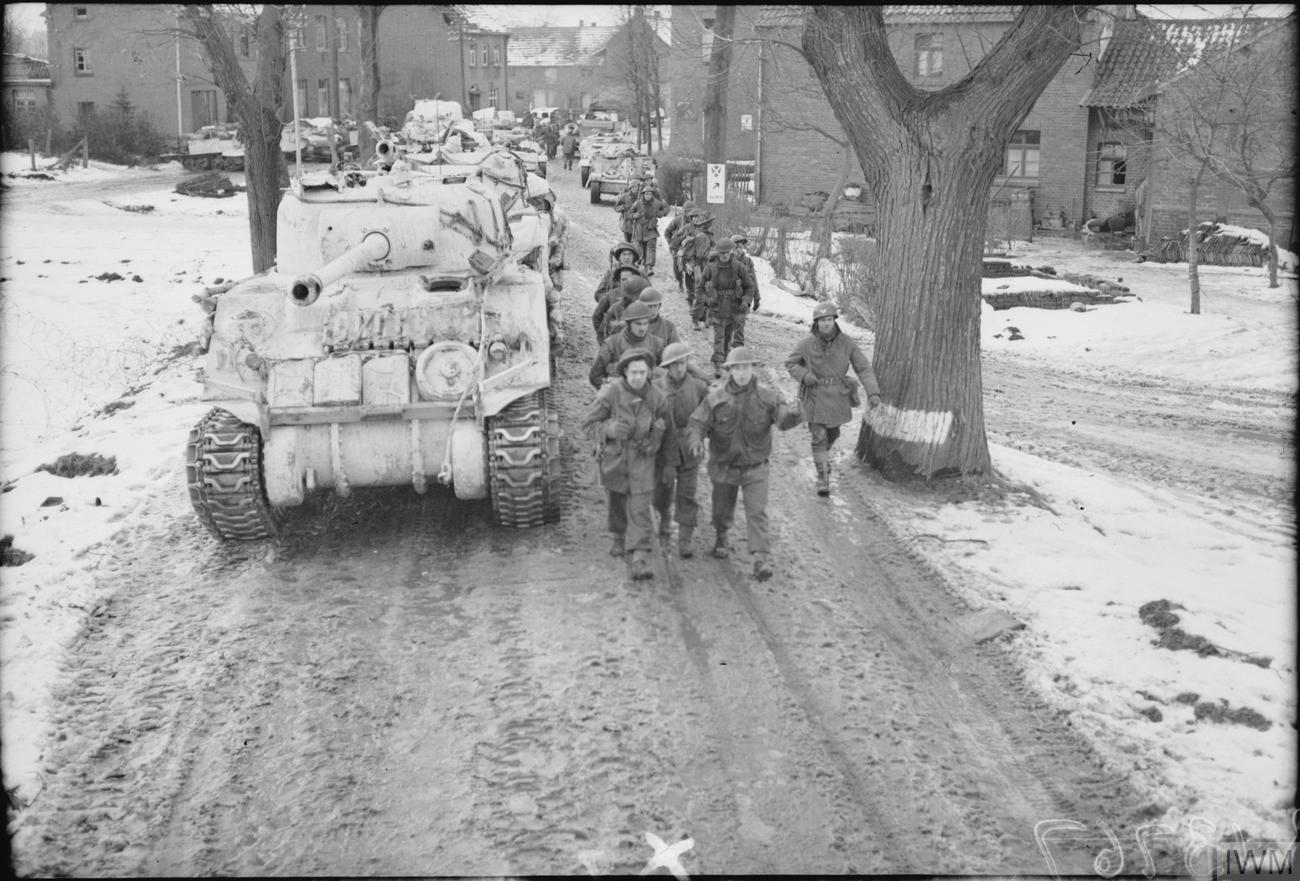
Infantrymen of the 6th Battalion, Cameronians passing Sherman tanks near Havert in Germany, 18 January 1945.

The 6th and 7th Battalions, both Territorial Army battalions, were deployed to France as part of the 156th Infantry Brigade in the 52nd (Lowland) Infantry Division to provide cover for the withdrawal of troops of the British Expeditionary Force; after the Normandy landings in June 1944, the battalion took part in the North West Europe Campaign in late 1944 and in 1945.

The 9th Battalion took part in the Normandy landings as part of the 46th (Highland) Infantry Brigade in the 15th (Scottish) Infantry Division in June 1944 and saw action in the North West Europe Campaign in late 1944 (including action at the Battle of Broekhuizen) and in 1945.

=== Post-war ===
In 1948, along with every other line infantry regiment of the British Army, the Cameronians regiment was reduced to a single regular battalion. The 1st Battalion which had been repeatedly decimated in the Burma campaign was placed in suspended animation and the 2nd Battalion was renamed the 1st Battalion while at Gibraltar. It was deployed to Malaya in 1950 during the Malayan Emergency. Under the reforms of the army in the 1967 Defence White Paper, which saw several regiments amalgamated, the Cameronians chose to disband rather than amalgamate with another in the Lowland Brigade.

In the 1960s the unruly behaviour of some of the Cameronians who were stationed in Minden as part of the BAOR caused a local to describe the smaller Scottish soldiers as "poison dwarfs".

The 1st Battalion, The Cameronians was disbanded on 14 May 1968 at Douglas Castle, near Douglas, South Lanarkshire in the presence of the Duke of Hamilton, the Earl of Angus. Its recruiting area in Lanarkshire and Dumfries and Galloway was taken over by the King's Own Scottish Borderers and the regimental headquarters finally closed down in 1987.

== Regimental museum ==
The Cameronians Museum is located within the Low Parks Museum, Hamilton, South Lanarkshire.

== Traditions ==
Every new member of the regiment was issued a Bible, as a nod to Richard Cameron, after whom the original 26th Foot was named and the regiment mounted an armed guard at the doors of the Kirk during religious services. Soldiers wore a rifle green doublet with Douglas tartan trews as part of their full dress and No.1 dress uniforms. The regiment was one of only two in Britain to retain the shako as its full-dress headwear after 1878.

== Battle honours ==
The regiment's battle honours included:

- Early wars: Blenheim, Ramillies, Oudenarde, Malplaquet, South Africa 1846–72, South Africa 1877-8-92, Relief of Ladysmith, South Africa 1899-1902
- The Great War: Mons, Le Cateau, Retreat from Mons, Marne 1914 '18, Aisne 1914, La Bassée 1914, Messines 1914, Armentières 1914, Neuve Chapelle, Aubers, Loos, Somme 1916 '18, Albert 1916, Bazentin, Pozières, Flers-Courcelette, Le Transloy, Ancre Heights, Arras 1917 '18, Scarpe 1917 '18, Arleux, Ypres 1917 '18, Pilckem, Langemarck 1917, Menin Road, Polygon Wood, Passchendaele, St Quentin, Rosières, Avre, Lys, Hazebrouck, Bailleul, Kemmel, Scherpenberg, Soissonnais-Ourcq, Drocourt-Quéant, Hindenberg Line, Épéhy, Canal du Nord, St Quentin Canal, Cambrai 1918, Courtrai, Selle, Sambre, France and Flanders 1914–18, Doiran 1917 '18, Macedonia 1915–18, Gallipoli 1915–16, Rumani, Egypt 1916–17, Gaza, El Mughar, Nebi Samwil, Jaffa, Palestine 1917–18
- Second World War: Ypres-Comines Canal, Odon, Cheux, Caen, Mont Pincon, Estry, Nederrijn, Best, Scheldt, South Beveland, Walcheren Causeway, Asten, Roer, Rhineland, Reichswald, Moyland, Rhine, Dreierwalde, Bremen, Artlenberg, North-West Europe 1940, '44-45, Landing in Sicily, Simeto Bridgehead, Sicily 1943, Garigliano Crossing, Anzio, Advance to Tiber, Italy 1943–44, Pegu 1942, Paungde, Yenagyaung 1942, Chindits 1944, Burma 1942 '44

== Colonel-in-Chief ==
The colonel-in-chief was as follows:

- 1956–1968: King Gustaf VI Adolf of Sweden.

== Regimental colonels ==
Regimental colonels were:

- 1881–1899 (1st Battalion): Gen. George Henry Mackinnon, CB (ex 26th Foot)
- 1881–1882 (2nd Battalion): Gen. William Hassall Eden (ex 90th Foot)
- 1882–1889 (2nd Battalion): Gen. John Alfred Street
- 1899–1910: Lt-Gen. Sir James Clerk Rattray, KCB
- 1910–1918: Maj-Gen. Joseph Henry Laye, CB, CVO
- 1918–1927: Maj-Gen. Sir Philip Rynd Robertson, KCB, CMG
- 1927–1946: Maj-Gen. Sir Eric Stanley Girdwood, KBE, CB, CMG
- 1946–1951: Gen. Sir Thomas Sheridan Riddell-Webster, GCB, DSO
- 1951–1954: Gen. Sir Richard Nugent O'Connor, GCB, DSO, MC
- 1954–1958: Maj-Gen. Douglas Alexander Henry Graham, CB, CBE, DSO, MC
- 1958–1964: Gen. Sir Horatius Murray, GCB, KBE, DSO
- 1964–1969: Lt-Gen. Sir Richard George Collingwood, KBE, CB, DSO
- 1968: regular unit disbanded
- 1969–1970: Maj-Gen. Henry Templer Alexander, CB, CBE, DSO
- 1970–1974: Maj-Gen. Henry Templer Alexander, CB, CBE, DSO (Representative Colonel)
- 1974–1987: Brig. David Balfour Riddell-Webster, OBE (Representative Colonel)

== Affiliations ==
Affiliations included:

- Canada The Perth Regiment – 1965: Canada
- Australia 26th Battalion (The Logan and Albert Regiment) 1928 – 1951: Australia
- New Zealand The Otago and Southland Regiment 1948 – 1968: New Zealand
- South Africa The Witwatersrand Rifles 1937 – 1961: South Africa
- Ghana 2nd Battalion, Ghana Regiment: Ghana
- United Kingdom 7th Duke of Edinburgh's Own Gurkha Rifles 1951– 1968: United Kingdom

== Notable former members of the regiment ==
- See also Category:Cameronians officers and Category:Cameronians soldiers
- Brigadier Cyril Nelson Barclay
- General Sir Roy Bucher
- General Sir Horatius Murray
- General Richard O'Connor
- General Sir Thomas Riddell-Webster
- Lieutenant-General Sir George Collingwood
- Lieutenant-General Sir John Fullerton Evetts
- Lieutenant-General Sir Alexander Galloway
- Major-General Henry Templer Alexander
- Major-General George Carter-Campbell
- Major-General John Dutton Frost
- Major-General Douglas Graham
- Major-General James Haugh
- Major-General Robin Money
- Major-General Sir Philip Rynd Robertson
- Major-General Eric Sixsmith
- Brigadier-General Graham Chaplin
- Rifleman Khan, awarded the Dickin Medal.

Also His Majesty Sultan Qaboos, the former ruler of the Sultanate of Oman, served with the Cameronians as a junior officer.

== Memorials ==
Face 5 of the British memorial on Spion Kop lists the names of the soldiers from the Cameronians who died at the Battle of Spion Kop during the Second Boer War. The Cameronians War Memorial in Kelvingrove Park, Glasgow by Philip Lindsey Clark, unveiled on 9 August 1924, depicts men of the regiment manning a Lewis gun. A monument commemorating both the founding of the regiment by the Earl of Angus in 1689 and its disbanding in 1968 can be found at Douglas, South Lanarkshire. Also within the village is a statue of the Earl of Angus to commemorate the bicentenary of the raising of the regiment.

== Sources ==
- Maj A. F. Becke, History of the Great War: Order of Battle of Divisions, Part 1: The Regular British Divisions, London: HM Stationery Office, 1934/Uckfield: Naval & Military Press, 2007, ISBN 1-847347-38-X.
- Maj A. F. Becke, History of the Great War: Order of Battle of Divisions, Part 2a: The Territorial Force Mounted Divisions and the 1st-Line Territorial Force Divisions (42–56), London: HM Stationery Office, 1935/Uckfield: Naval & Military Press, 2007, ISBN 1-847347-39-8.
- Maj A. F. Becke, History of the Great War: Order of Battle of Divisions, Part 3b: New Army Divisions (30–41) and 63rd (R.N.) Division, London: HM Stationery Office, 1939/Uckfield: Naval & Military Press, 2007, ISBN 1-847347-41-X.
- Brig-Gen Sir James E. Edmonds, History of the Great War: Military Operations, France and Belgium, 1914, Vol II, London: Macmillan, 1925/Imperial War Museum & Battery Press, 1995, ISBN 1-870423-55-0.
- Allen, Calvin H.; Rigsbee, W. Lynn (1 January 2000). Oman Under Qaboos: From Coup to Constitution, 1970–1996. Psychology Press. ISBN 9780714650012.
- Lt-Col Graham Seton-Hutchinson, The Thirty-Third Division in France and Flanders, 1915–1919, London: Waterlow & Sons 1921/Uckfield: Naval & Military Press, 2004, ISBN 978-1-84342-995-1.
- Lt-Col R. R. Thompson, The Fifty-Second (Lowland) Division 1914–1918, Glasgow: Maclehose, Jackson 1923/Uckfield: Naval & Military, 2004, ISBN 978-1-84342993-7.
