= The Kensington Club =

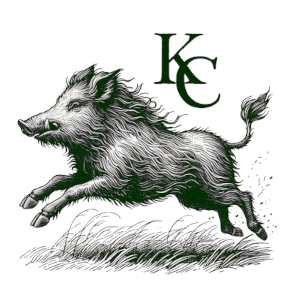
The Kensington Boar - Emblem of the Kensington Club

The Kensington Club is a private all-male dining club for students of the University of St Andrews.

== History ==
The details of the foundation of the Kensington Club are opaque. The Club’s own histories maintain that the Club was founded by Alexander, the Laird of Balgonie in the year 1739. While Alexander Laird Balgonie was indeed a historical figure, the extant family seat of Castle Balgonie being only 30 miles from the town of St Andrews, it is difficult to confirm the account of the often self-referential ‘club histories’ with confirmatory independent documentary evidence.

The club was certainly founded prior to the appearance of the “Kensington Song” in a publication of 1792 (see below). The epithet then given to it as “celebrated” suggests that the Club was founded some significant time earlier, giving credence to the possibility that the legend surrounding Alexander Balgonie is true. Further evidence of this can be found in the lyric of the song, which opens with a direct reference to “Balgonie of Fife”.

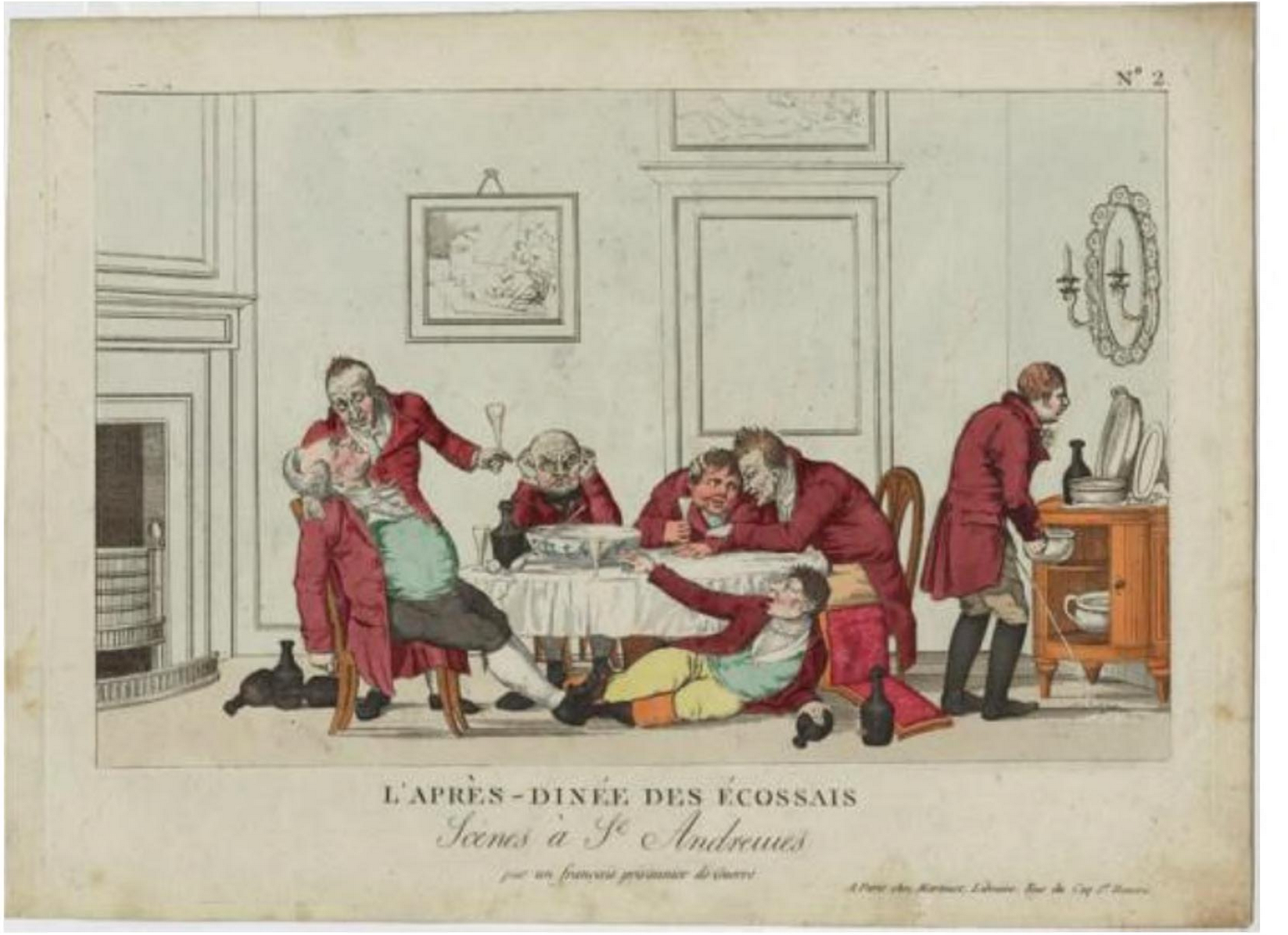
Copperplate engraving of 1814, entitled “L’Après Dinée des Écossais - Scenes á St Andrewes”

The etymology of the Club’s name remains unclear. There are three theories as to its origin: 1. It is a corruption or anglicisation of the Scots name of the town of ‘Kennoway’/‘Kennoton’, a town in Fife less than two miles from Castle Balgonie; 2. It is a corruption or anglicisation of the old Scots term ‘keest-an-ton’ meaning ‘a vigorous shout or hunting cry’; and 3. There is some suggestion in the Club’s own history that ‘Kensington’ may have been the name of a mutually funded race horse owned by the club at some point in its early history.The evidence for the continued activities of the club are unsurprisingly scanty in the historical record. A print collection of 1814, by an anonymous Frenchman, contains a plate which is generally supposed to show the Kensington Club at dinner, entitled “L’Après Dinée des Écossais - Scenes á St Andrewes”. The engraving depicts seven men in matching maroon tailcoats in the later throes of a drunken dinner party (maroon and green being the club colours).

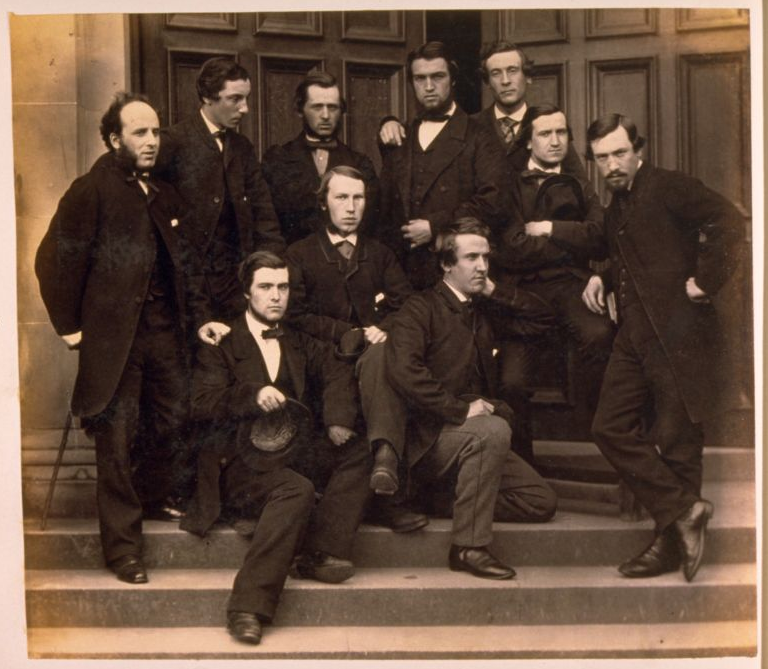
Group portrait taken c.1870 on the steps of St Salvators Quad of the Kensington Club, from the University of St Andrews' photographic archive.

After the Second World War the Kensington Club entered a period of decline. It is not clear if the club was dormant or not, and the issue is hotly contested. It is generally accepted that the Club was re-constituted in its current form in the 1970s.

In 2001 Raymond, the present Laird of Balgonie, was given honorary membership and made the club patron.

== Activities ==
Private dinners for club members are held biweekly. Etiquette and manners are enforced on the penalty of port.

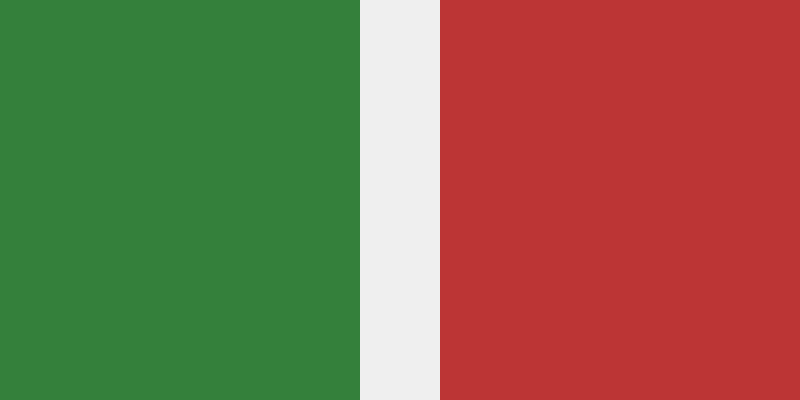
Club Colours of the Kensington Club

Club members attend dinners wearing a uniform consisting of a tailcoat, waistcoat and bow tie in the club colours.

The club has received intermittent attention in regional Scottish and university publications, detailing its activities, and occasional attention from national media.

== Kensington Club Song ==
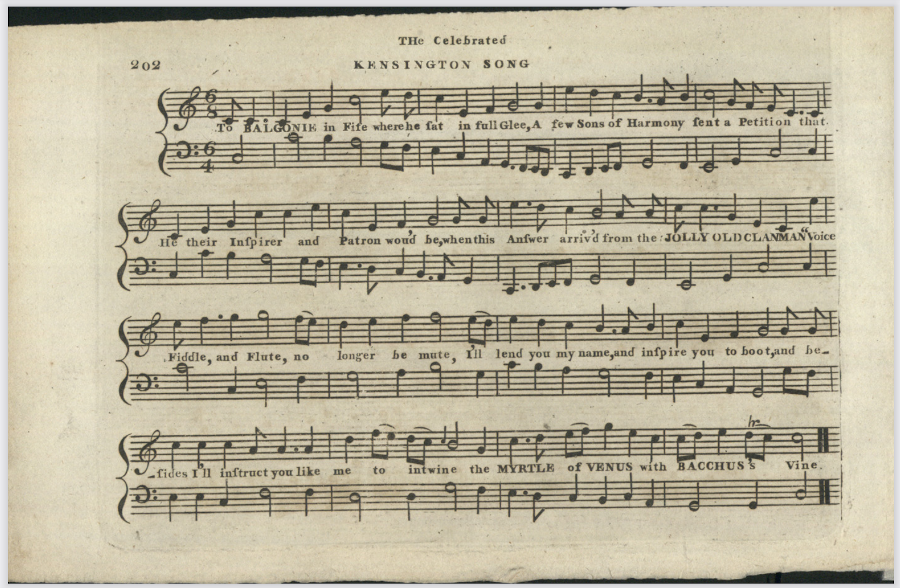
Page 1 of the "Kensington Song" in "Songs and Anthems for the Piano Forte, Harpsichord and Voice", published in Edinburgh, 1792.

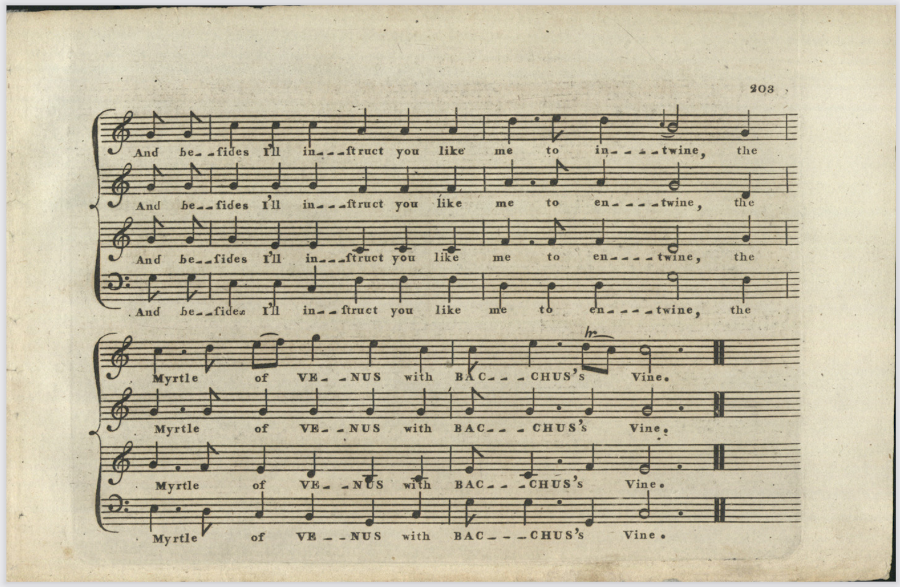
Page 2 of the "Kensington Song" in "Songs and Anthems for the Piano Forte, Harpsichord and Voice", published in Edinburgh, 1792.

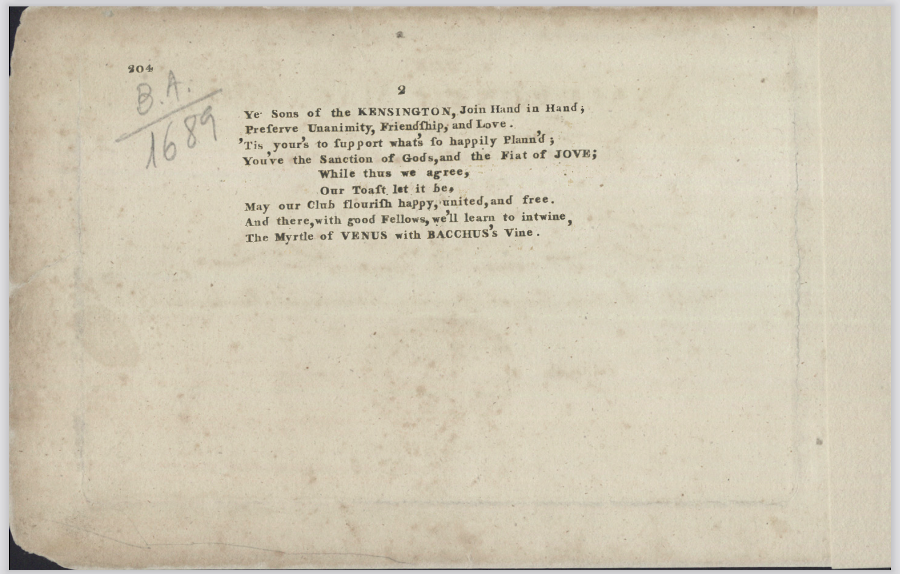
Page 3, "Kensington Song" in "Songs and Anthems for the Piano Forte, Harpsichord and Voice", published in Edinburgh, 1792.

The 'Kensington Song' played according to the 1792 version on the organ of St Annes, Moseley.

“The Kensington Song”, also known by its incipit “To Balgonie of Fife”, is the official song of the Kensington Club. The song bears extremely close relations to “The Anacreontic Song”, and it seems likely that it is an altered version of that original text. The Anacreontic song was also used by several other clubs and societies in altered form, eventually being combined with patriotic lyrics and adopted as the national anthem of the United States of America in 1931.

The date of the composition of the Song is uncertain. It cannot predate the composition of the Anacreontic Song, which is generally supposed to have been December 1773. The "Kensington lyrics" of the song were included in Songs and Anthems for the Piano Forte, Harpsichord and Voice, published in 1792. This publication does not name the composer.

=== Lyrics ===
1

To Balgonie of Fife, where he sat in full Glee,

A few Sons of Harmony sent a Petition,

That he their Inspirer and Patron would be;

When this answer arriv’d from the jolly old clansman

“Voice, Fiddle and Flute,

“No longer be mute,

“I’ll lend you my Name and inspire you to boot,

“And, besides I’ll instruct you, like me, to intwine

“The Myrtle of Venus with Bacchus’s Vine.”

2

Ye sons of the Kensington, join Hand in Hand;

Preserve Unanimity, Friendship and Love!

'Tis yours to support what's so happily planned.

You’ve the sanction of Gods, and the Fiat of Jove.

While thus we agree,

Our Toast let it be:

May our Club flourish happy, united and free!

As here, with good Fellows, we learn to intwine

The Myrtle of Venus with Bacchus’s Vine.
