= The 16' Club =

Dining club

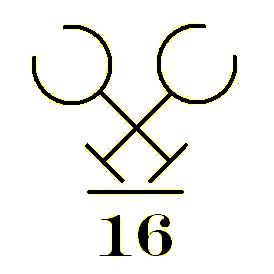
The Club Emblem

The 16' Club, commonly referred to as The Sixteens, the College Sixteen or simply 16, is a private dining club for male members of St David's College, Trinity Saint David.

It is the only remaining undergraduate dining club at the university, and the oldest in Wales.

== Foundation and tradition ==
Established for undergraduate scholars at St David's College, the precise foundation of the club is impossible to place accurately because so much documentation from the pre-war era has been lost. Nonetheless a volume published by HarperCollins places the approximate foundation of the club at 1874-6.

There existed a body of students in the 1830s to 1850s who banded together in secrecy to flout the rules forbidding students from appearing in the town without their gown, "communicating" with local women and frequenting the local alehouses. It is this tradition which the Club is known for following.

While some authors have categorised it as a secret society, this is contested in other sources.

The club's colour is pale blue.

== Present day ==
Today The 16' Club is solely a dining club, though vestiges of the university's clerical origin remain in the retention of the College Prayer and the nominal requirement that members be bachelors.

The clandestine nature of these meetings, and the reticence of its members, means that little is known about the club.

== Purpose ==
The purpose of the College 16 is loosely defined as, "...to maintain the traditions of Saint David's College, and to provide and maintain a fraternity of gentlemen of calibre for mutual support whilst at University and in post graduate life."

== Membership ==
Membership of the club is by invitation only. The requirements and procedure are unknown. There is also reference to an initiation where all members stand on the Mound outside the Old Building and relieve themselves. How true these tasks are is unknown.

== Notable members ==
- Bishop Carl Cooper
- Henry Dartnall
- Steve Eaves
- William Gibson
- Lord Brian Griffiths
- Jules Hudson
- Ian Marchant
- Karl McCartney MP
- Pete Paphides
- Bishop Timothy Rees MC
- Sulak Sivaraksa
- Malcolm Todd
- Vice Admiral Peter John Wilkinson

== See also ==
- Secret societies
