= Chatham Dining Club =

Dining club based in London, England

The Chatham Dining Club is a general interest Dining club based in London, England. The club was founded in 1910 by Captain Rupert Ommanney and Captain Guy Dawnay whilst they were students at the British Army Staff College in Camberley.

The Club rapidly grew and was run for many years by the founder members including John Buchan, 1st Baron Tweedsmuir, Robert Brand, 1st Baron Brand and Sir Cuthbert Headlam, 1st Baronet. A collection of papers The Records of the Chatham Dining Club were published in 1915.

The Club continues to host dinners in London to hear well known speakers on a wide variety of topics; which include politics, the arts, international relations, education, military affairs, business, trade unionism and leisure pursuits.
