= Tea and Symphony =

60s and 70s Folk Band

Tea and Symphony were a British psychedelic folk musical group of the late 1960s and early 1970s from Birmingham, England. They recorded two albums for Harvest Records, had one track, "Maybe My Mind (With Egg)", included on the Harvest sampler Picnic - A Breath of Fresh Air, toured Britain with Bakerloo (Blues Line) and were guests on John Peel's BBC radio programme.

The group were generally a trio, though sometimes supplemented by extra musicians. Members included Jeff Daw (lead guitar, backing vocals, flute), James Langston (lead vocals, rhythm guitar), Nigel Phillips (drums, backing vocals, keyboards, recorder, left 1969), Jonathan Benyon (mime, joined 1968 left 1969), Dave Carroll (guitar, backing vocals, bass, violin, joined 1970, left 1971), Bob Wilson (guitar, keyboards, joined 1969, left 1971), Peter 'Chatters' Chatfield (drums, joined 1970, left 1972), Tom Bennison (bass, French horn, joined & left 1970), Mick Barker (drums, joined 1971), and Stewart Johnson (guitars, vocal, joined 1971). Steve Eaves is another former alumnus.

Tea and Symphony were one of the earliest bands to have their own dedicated light show, one of which was Ephemera Lights (Steve Hayes).

They broke up in mid-1972, a few months after Wilson, Carroll and later addition drummer, Bob Lamb, had all left in February 1972 to join The Idle Race, which within weeks evolved into The Steve Gibbons Band.

== Albums ==
=== An Asylum for the Musically Insane ===
LP Harvest SHVL 761 (1969)

1. "Armchair Theatre" - 3:54
2. "Feel How So Cool The Wind" - 3:19
3. "Sometime" - 4:14
4. "Maybe My Mind (With Egg)" (Jeff Daw) - 3:42
5. "The Come On" - 4:30
6. "Terror In My Soul" (Jeff Daw, Nigel Phillips) - 6:06
7. "Travelling Shoes" (Fred Neil) - 4:25
8. "Winter" (James Langston) - 3:19
9. "Nothing Will Come To Nothing" (Nigel Phillips) - 6:12

(All tracks written by Jeff Daw except where noted.)

Personnel:

- Jeff Daw - lead guitar, flute, triangle, vocals
- James Langston - lead vocals, rhythm guitar, kazoo, bells, cymbal
- Nigel Phillips - drums, recorder, mandolin, organ, piano, vocals

with:

- Mick Hincks - bass (05)
- Bob Lamb - drums (05)
- Clem Clempson - lead guitar (05)
- Ron Chesterman - bass (07)
- Gus Dudgeon - percussion, producer

=== Jo Sago ===
LP Harvest SHVL 785 (1970)

- 1) Jo Sago - A Play On Music (Jeff Daw) including:
- a. "Miniature" - 2:01
- b. "Nyada" - 4:06
- c. "Journey" - 1:19
- d. "Brother" - 3:51
- e. "Africa Paprika" - 3:29
- f. "Fairground Suite" - 2:25
- g. "Desperate Oil" - 5:53
- h. "Umbilical Bill" - 0:51
- i. "Goodnight" - 3:33
- 2) "Try Your Luck" (Nigel Phillips) - 3:18
- 3) "Yourself" (James Langston) - 3:28
- 4) "Green Fingered" - Redhanded (Jeff Daw) - 0:54
- 5) "Seasons Turn To One" (Jeff Daw) - 3:04
- 6) "View To The Sky" (James Langston) - 2:41
- 7) "The Nortihorticulturalist" (Nigel Phillips) - 3:26
- 8) "Dangling" (Bob Wilson) - 0:59

Personnel:

- James Langston - lead vocals, acoustic & 12-string guitars, percussion (died 2021)
- Jef Daw - acoustic, electric & 12-string guitars, bass guitar, percussion, flute, backing vocals
- Bob Wilson - piano, organ, harpsichord, acoustic, electric & 12-string guitars, bass guitar, percussion, backing vocals
- Nigel Phillips - drums
- Mick Hincks - guitar

Produced by Tony Cox
