= King Arthur's Great Halls =

Grade II* listed building in Fore Street, Tintagel, Cornwall, England

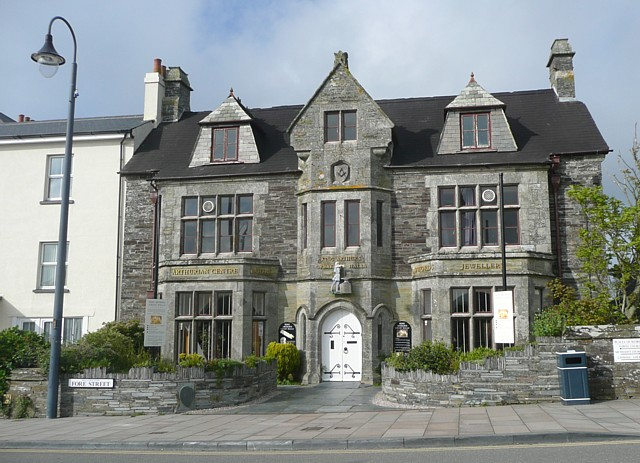

- Location within Cornwall
- 50.664°N 4.751°W
- Location: Tintagel, Cornwall, England

Listed Building – Grade II*
- Official name: King Arthur's Great Halls
- Designated: 20 July 1987
- Reference no.: 1267387

King Arthur's Great Halls (opened 1933) is a Grade II* listed building in Fore Street, Tintagel, Cornwall, England, UK. Built in the early 1930s by Frederick Thomas Glasscock (died 1934), it originally served as the headquarters for a social organization known as the Fellowship of the Knights of the Round Table of King Arthur. It contains some works of art relating to the Arthurian legend and is now a popular visitor attraction for Arthurian enthusiasts, and has a bookshop devoted to the subject at the front of the building.

== Fellowship of the Knights of the Round Table of King Arthur ==
Glasscock founded the Fellowship of the Knights of the Round Table of King Arthur in 1927 to promote Christian ideals and his interpretation of Arthurian notions of medieval chivalry. Glasscock was resident at Tintagel (in the house "Eirenikon" which he had built) and responsible for the building of King Arthur's Hall. The Hall was itself an extension of Trevena House, which had been John Douglas Cook's residence and had been built on the site of the former Town Hall and Market Hall in Fore Street. 53 different types of Cornish stone are used in the construction. The hall is also used by the Order of the Fellowship of the Knights of the Round Table of King Arthur for their annual dinner, held on the first Saturday in June.

== Masonic Hall ==
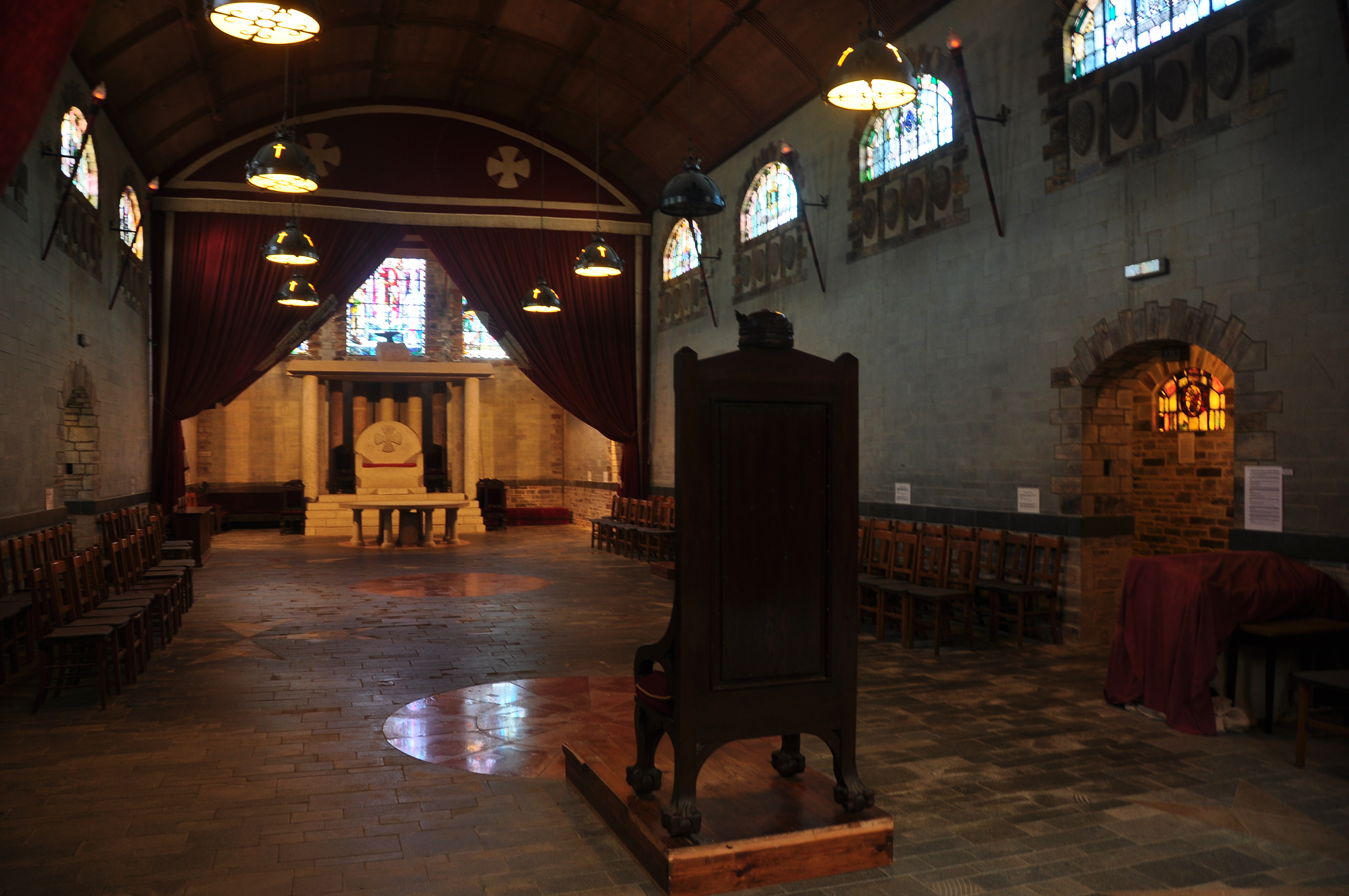
The interior of the hall

Since 1952, the building has been used as a Masonic Hall and is home to the King Arthur Lodge No. 7134. In 1962 a Royal Arch Chapter was formed by the Lodge, and the building is used by some other lodges to hold their installation meetings. The hall is now a home to four Masonic bodies:

- King Arthur Lodge No. 7134 which was warranted on 13 November 1951;
- St Enodoc Lodge No. 9226 which was consecrated on 30 May 1987;
- King Arthur Royal Arch Chapter No. 7134 which was consecrated on 31 March 1962;
- Tintagel Castle Lodge of Mark Master Masons No. 1800 which was consecrated on 23 April 1999.

== Works of art ==
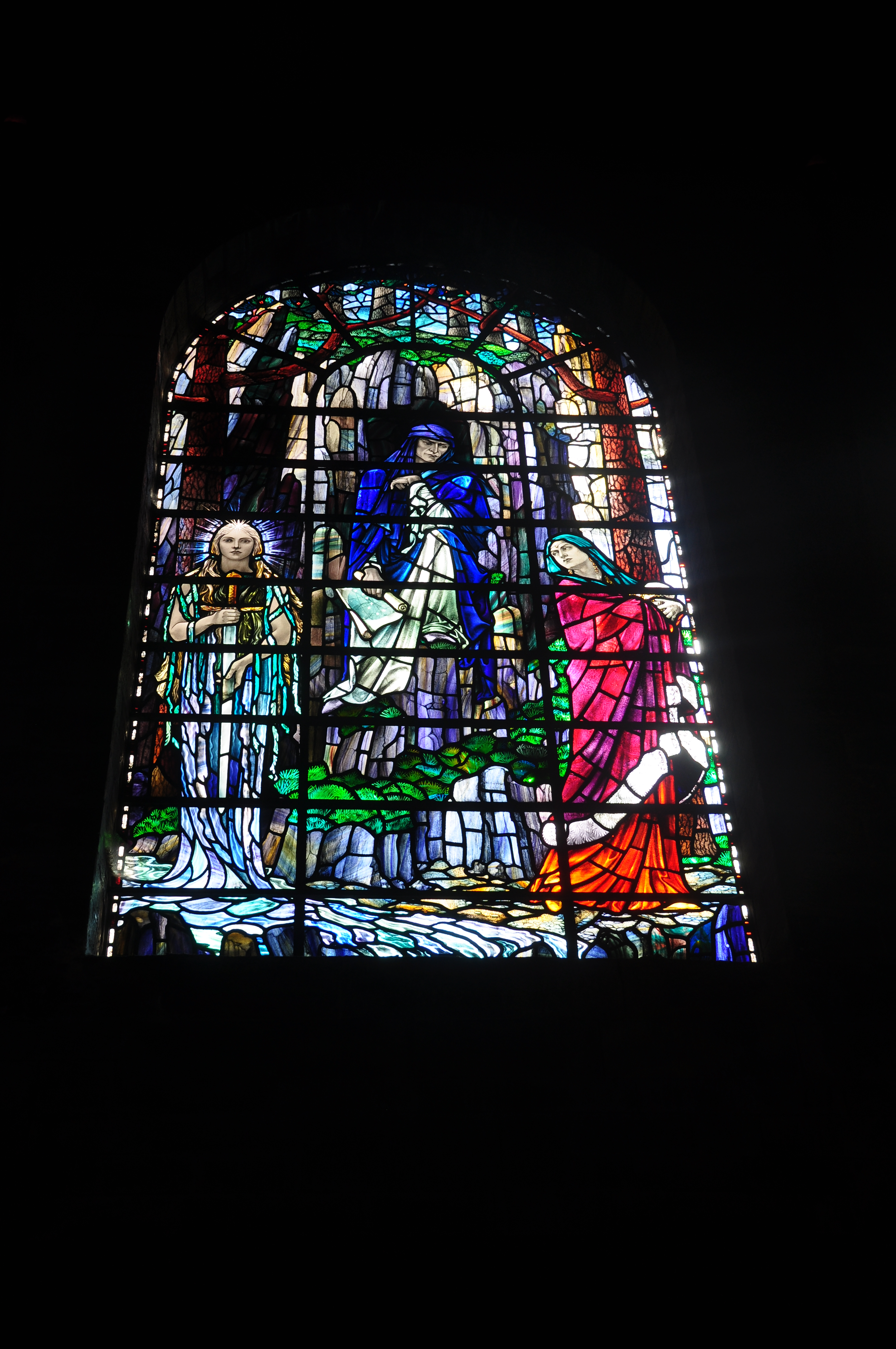
One of the stained-glass windows by Veronica Whall

The 72 stained-glass windows illustrating the Arthurian tales are by Veronica Whall. These tell the story of King Arthur and show the coats of arms and weapons of the knights involved. Whall designed 73 windows for the hall. As of 1997 it is considered to be the largest collection of stained glass panels of King Arthur made in the 20th century and a great example of Arts and Crafts workmanship. (Note: King Arthur author Mike Ashley states that there were 72 panels made.) There are also several paintings of scenes from King Arthur's life by William Hatherell.
