= Moelyci =

Studio album by Steve Eaves
- Released: 2007
- Recorded: 2001–2007
- Genres: Folk, rock, blues
- Label: Sain

Steve Eaves chronology
Iawn (2001)	Moelyci (2007)

Professional ratings
Review scores
Source	Rating
Sing Out!	(not rated)
FolkWorld.de	(not rated)

Moelyci is a 2007 album by the poet, singer and songwriter Steve Eaves. Eaves sings and plays guitar on the album, and is backed by his long-time backing band, Rhai Pobl. The album also features the well-known Welsh poet Gerallt Lloyd Owen reciting his poetry, accompanied by music. All the songs are sung in Welsh. The album is considered to be Eaves's way of getting to terms with the death of his wife, Siân; the title, Moelyci refers to the mountain where his wife's ashes were scattered:

I have been raising my eyes towards Moelyci for most of my life. (...)

By the end of the 1970s Siân and I and our first little baby were living in our Council house in Maesgeirchen. Late at night we would sit at the bottom of our stairs with the front door open and a blanket around our shoulders, talking quietly and gazing towards Moelyci and Moel Rhiwen and their dark slopes against the blue night. Rhiwlas and the slopes were calling to us.

The 80s and 90s : On the slopes of Moelyci our three children learnt to walk. And on the slopes of Moelyci, as Siân had requested, we scattered her ashes. And that's where her spirit is now, a gentle breeze in the heather and bracken, over the stones and tiny streams, moving along the paths in every season.

== Track listing ==
1. Ymlaen mae Canaan (Onwards to Canaan)
2. Gad Iddi Fynd (Let Her Go)
3. Moelyci
4. Taw Pia' Hi [Y Tao Pia' Hi] (Silence is the Way [The Tao's the Way])
5. Lleuad Medi (September Moon)
6. Bwgi Rhif 2 (Boogie No.2)
7. Ni sydd ar ôl (We who're left behind)
8. Gwlad y Caledi (The Land of Hardship)
9. Pa le yw hwn? (What Place is this?)
10. Croeso mawr yn d'ôl (A big welcome back)
11. Llifogydd ym Mhentir (Floods in Pentir)
12. Nos Da, Mam (Goodnight, Mam)
13. Mesen (Acorn)

== Band members ==
Steve Eaves, Elwyn Williams, Iwan Llwyd, Gwyn "Maffia" Jones, Jackie Williams, Owen Evans, Jochen Eisentraut, Manon Steffan Ros, Steven Rees, and Gwyn Evans.
