= Guy Dawnay (British Army officer) =

British Army general

Major-General Guy Dawnay CB CMG DSO MVO
- Born: 23 March 1878; St James's Palace, London
- Died: 19 January 1952 (aged 73); Longparish, Hampshire
- Relatives: The Hon. Lewis Payn Dawnay (father)
- Military career
- Allegiance: United Kingdom
- Branch: British Army
- Service years: 1895–1933
- Rank: Major-General
- Conflicts: Second Boer War; First World War: Gallipoli campaign; Sinai and Palestine campaign
- Awards: Companion of the Order of the Bath; Companion of the Order of St Michael and St George; Distinguished Service Order; Member of the Royal Victorian Order; Mentioned in Despatches (11); Legion of Honour (France); Order of St. Anna (Russia); Order of Saints Maurice and Lazarus (Italy); Army Distinguished Service Medal (United States)

Major-General Guy Payan Dawnay, CB, CMG, DSO, MVO (23 March 1878 – 19 January 1952) was a British Army officer and merchant banker. He was the nephew of Guy Dawnay, a politician.

== Career ==
Dawnay was commissioned a second lieutenant in the Coldstream Guards on 20 May 1899, and promoted to lieutenant on 10 July 1900. He served in South Africa during the Second Boer War, where he was a staff officer as aide-de-camp to Major-General Bruce Hamilton, in command in Eastern Transvaal. Following the end of hostilities, he left Cape Town with Hamilton on board the SS Walmer Castle in late June 1902, and arrived at Southampton the following month. For his service in the war, he was appointed a Companion of the Distinguished Service Order (DSO) in the October 1902 South African honours list.

He served as an adjutant at the Guards Depot in November 1904 and was raised to the rank of captain in February 1909.

He retired from the army on 3 May 1910.

During the First World War Dawnay was temporarily appointed as a GSO2 at the War Office in London on 30 September 1914. He was assigned to the General Staff of the Mediterranean Expeditionary Force and fought at the Gallipoli campaign during the First World War. Following the withdrawal from Gallipoli he was shifted to the headquarters of the newly formed Egyptian Expeditionary Force. When the corps-sized Eastern Force was created under Lieutenant-General Charles Dobell in September 1916 to command operations in the Sinai, Dawnay was assigned as Chief of Staff (Brigadier General, General Staff). He continued as Chief of Staff to Dobell's successor Philip Chetwode until August 1917 when he became Deputy Chief of Staff of the Egyptian Expeditionary Force, still with the rank of the Brigadier-General.

Following the Battle of Jerusalem Dawnay was transferred to the General Headquarters of the British Expeditionary Force in France with a promotion to temporary major general in February 1918. As head of the Staff Duties Section of the General Staff he was responsible for training, organization, anti-aircraft defence, and censorship and publicity.

In May 1919, and with the war now over, he relinquished his temporary rank of major general. He was, however, promoted to honorary major general the next month and retired from the army.

In 1909 whilst a student at the Staff College, Camberley, he co-founded the Chatham Dining Club with Rupert Ommanney. In 1928 he founded Dawnay Day, an investment company together with Julian Day.
