= Society of Knights of the Round Table =

British social club

Arms of the Society

The Honourable Society of Knights of the Round Table, also known as The Knights of the Round Table Club, is a British society which exists to perpetuate the name and fame of King Arthur and the ideals for which he stood. It meets at the Lansdowne Club, Mayfair.

== History ==
The society was formed in 1720 at the Fountain Coffee House, the site of the former Savoy Palace on London's Strand. Its membership was drawn from authors, actors, artists, and their patrons. Famous members included David Garrick, who was a member from 1761 to 1776, and Charles Dickens.

== Activities ==
The society funds a prize in a surgical skills competition for the Royal College of Surgeons of England.

In 2023 the benevolent fund had an income of £42,410 and spent £52,250.

The society describes its principal activities as:

- To provide a dining society for members and their guests.
- Through the operation of a Benevolent Fund (registered charity no. 212217) to distribute awards to selected students from the arts, music, conservation, hand skills and legal training colleges, schools, services cadet and scout groups in London, in order to encourage and support them at the outset of their careers.

== Aims ==
The society describes its aims as:

- The perpetuation of the name and fame of Arthur, King of Britain and the Ideals for which he stood.
- The promotion of Knightly good fellowship.
- To encourage and support talented young people in their cultural achievements.

== Knight President ==
As of 2025, the Knight President of the Society is Admiral Alan West, Baron West of Spithead. The society holds an annual service of rededication in the Knights Chapel, church of St Martin, Ludgate in the City of London.
