= Edmund Henry Lenon =

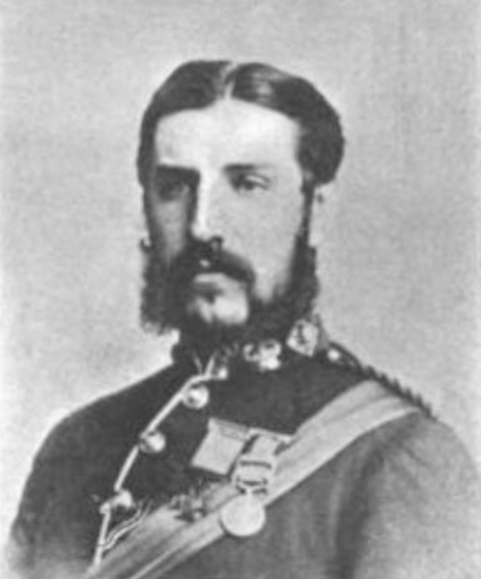
- Born: 26 August 1838; Mortlake, Surrey
- Died: 15 April 1893 (aged 54); Lambeth, London
- Burial place: Kensal Green Cemetery
- Military career
- Allegiance: United Kingdom
- Branch: British Army
- Rank: Lieutenant Colonel
- Units: 67th Regiment of Foot; Queen's Own Royal West Kent Regiment
- Conflicts: Second Opium War
- Awards: Victoria Cross

Lieutenant Colonel Edmund Henry Lenon VC (26 August 1838 – 15 April 1893) was an English recipient of the Victoria Cross, the highest and most prestigious award for gallantry in the face of the enemy that can be awarded to British and Commonwealth forces.

Lenon was 21 years old, and a lieutenant in the 67th Regiment of Foot (later The Royal Hampshire Regiment), British Army during the Second Opium War when the following deed took place for which he was awarded the VC.

On 21 August 1860 at the Taku Forts, China, Lieutenant Lenon, with Lieutenant Robert Montresor Rogers and Private John McDougall of the 44th Foot, displayed great gallantry in the ditches and entering the North Taku Fort by an embrasure during the assault. They were the first of the British troops established on the walls of the fort.

After retirement with the rank of brevet major, he was commanding officer of the 3rd (West Kent) Kent Rifle Volunteers from 1871 to 1883 in the rank of lieutenant-colonel. His Victoria Cross is displayed at The Royal Hampshire Regiment Museum & Memorial Garden in Winchester, England.
