= Robert Montresor Rogers =

Major-General Robert Montresor Rogers VC CB
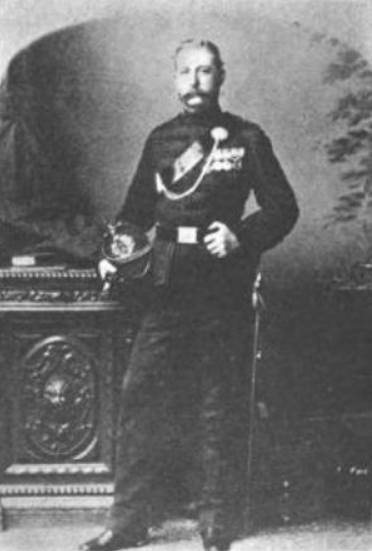
- Born: 4 September 1834; Dublin, Ireland
- Died: 5 February 1895 (aged 60); Maidenhead, Berkshire, England
- Military career
- Allegiance: United Kingdom
- Branch: British Army
- Rank: Major-General
- Units: 44th Regiment of Foot
- Conflicts: Crimean War; Second Opium War; Anglo-Zulu War
- Awards: Victoria Cross; Companion of the Order of the Bath

Major-General Robert Montresor Rogers, VC, CB (4 September 1834 – 5 February 1895) was a British Army officer and an Irish recipient of the Victoria Cross, the highest award for gallantry in the face of the enemy that can be awarded to British and Commonwealth forces.

== Details ==
He was 25 years old, and a lieutenant in the 44th Regiment of Foot, British Army during the Second Opium War when the following deed took place for which he was awarded the VC.

On 21 August 1860 at the Taku Forts, China, Lieutenant Rogers, together with a private (John McDougall) of his regiment and a lieutenant of the 67th Regiment (Edmund Henry Lenon) displayed great gallantry in swimming the ditches and entering the North Taku Fort by an embrasure during the assault.

His citation reads:

For distinguished gallantry in swimming the Ditches, and entering the North Taku Fort by an embrasure during the assault. They were the first of the English established on the walls of the Fort, which they entered in the order in which their names are here recorded, each one being assisted by the others to mount the embrasure.

== Further information ==
He later achieved the rank of major general. He died in Maidenhead, Berkshire, 5 February 1895 and he is buried in the churchyard at All Saints church, Boyne Hill, Maidenhead.

His Medal is displayed at the "Du Monde Traigue" Museum in Brussels.
