= John McDougall (VC) =

Recipient of the Victoria Cross

John Leishman McDougall
- Born: 2 January 1839; Edinburgh
- Died: 10 March 1869 (aged 29–30)
- Burial place: Old Calton Cemetery, Edinburgh
- Military career
- Allegiance: United Kingdom
- Branch: British Army
- Rank: Private
- Units: 44th (East Essex) Regiment of Foot
- Conflicts: Second China War Battle of Taku Forts
- Awards: Victoria Cross

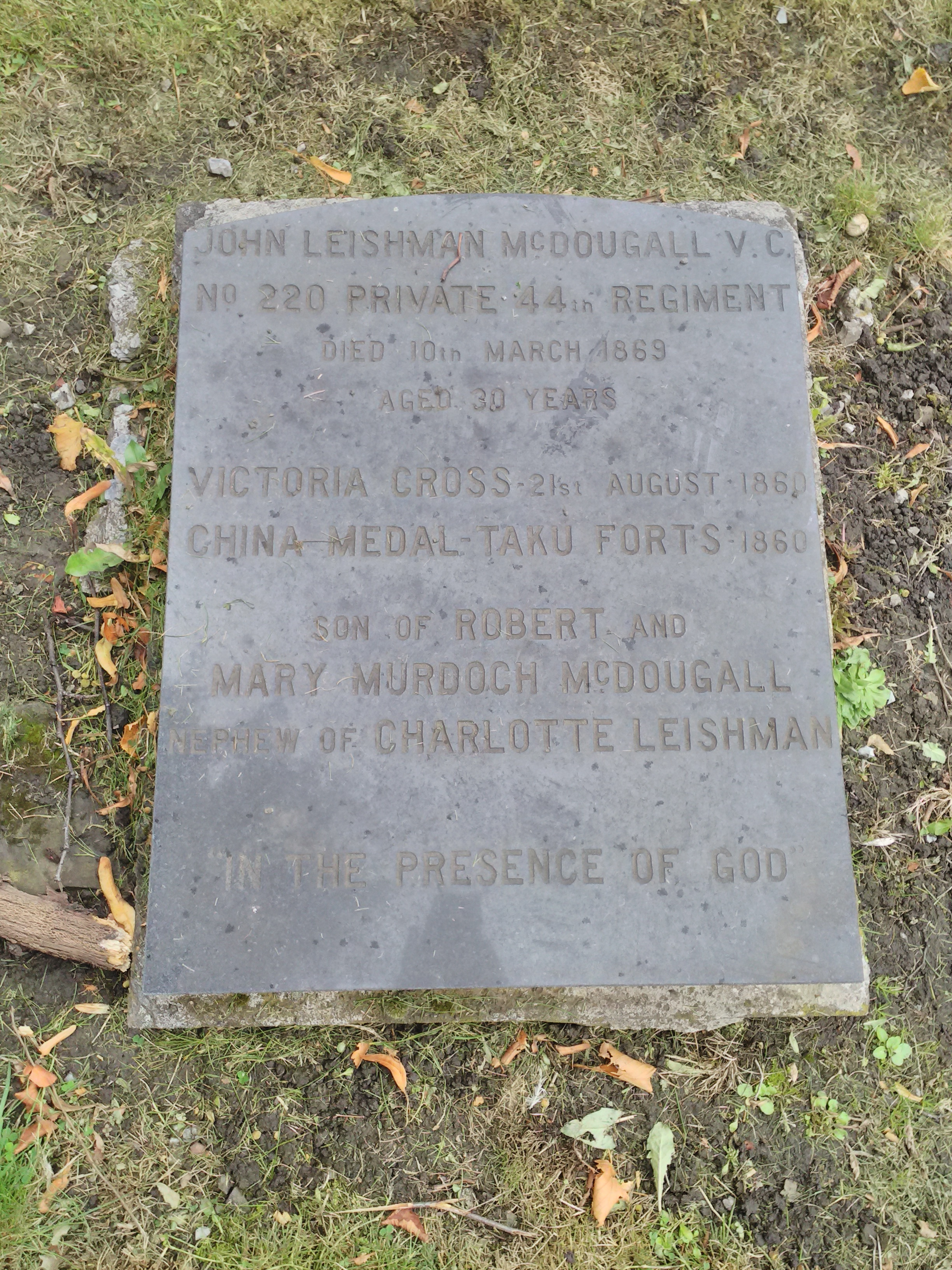
The grave of John Leishman McDougall VC, Old Calton Cemetery, Edinburgh

John Leishman McDougall VC (1839 – 10 March 1869) was a Scottish recipient of the Victoria Cross, the highest and most prestigious award for gallantry in the face of the enemy that can be awarded to British and Commonwealth forces.

== Details ==
He was approximately 21 years old, and a private in the 44th (East Essex) Regiment of Foot (later The Essex Regiment), British Army during the Second China War when the following deed took place for which he was awarded the VC.

On 21 August 1860 at the Taku Forts, China, Private McDougall with an officer of his regiment (Robert Montresor Rogers) and a lieutenant of the 67th Regiment (Edmund Henry Lenon) displayed great gallantry in swimming the ditches and entering the North Taku Fort by an embrasure during the assault. They were the first of the British established on the walls of the Fort.

Until 1990 he laid in an unmarked grave. A campaign at that time added a stone to all unmarked VC winners. He is buried in Old Calton Cemetery. The grave lies to the north-east, not far from the main entrance.

== The medal ==
The VC was stolen from the family home in 1960 and never recovered. The ribbon and bar are displayed at The Essex Regiment Museum, Chelmsford, Essex, England.

== See also ==
- List of Scottish Victoria Cross recipients
