= 20th Battalion, London Regiment (Blackheath and Woolwich) =

20th Battalion, London Regiment (Blackheath & Woolwich) 34th (Queen's Own) Searchlight Regiment, RA 569 (Queen's Own) Light AA/Searchlight Regiment, RA
- Active: 1908–1961
- Country: United Kingdom
- Branch: Territorial Army
- Type: Infantry Battalion; Searchlight Regiment; Anti-Aircraft Regiment
- Role: Infantry, Air Defence
- Garrison/HQ: Holly Hedge House, Blackheath
- Engagements: Western Front; Salonika; Palestine; Dunkirk; The Blitz

Commanders
- Notable commanders: Lt-Col Edmund Henry Lenon, VC

The 20th (County of London) Battalion, The London Regiment (Blackheath and Woolwich), was a unit of Britain's Territorial Force formed in 1908 from Volunteer corps dating back to 1859. It saw considerable service on the Western Front, at Salonika and in Palestine during the First World War. It served as a searchlight regiment and later as an infantry regiment during the Second World War.

== Background ==
The London Regiment was created in 1908 as part of the Haldane Reforms, and consisted entirely of Territorial Force (TF) infantry battalions, with no Regular component. Its Blackheath and Woolwich Battalion was formed by merging two Volunteer battalions that had previously been affiliated to the Queen's Own Royal West Kent Regiment, but whose recruiting areas (the boroughs of Deptford, Greenwich, Lewisham and Woolwich) had been transferred from Kent on the formation of the County of London in 1889.

== Early history ==
=== 3rd Kent (West Kent) Rifle Volunteers ===
The invasion scare of 1859 led to the creation of the Volunteer Force and huge enthusiasm for joining local Rifle Volunteer Corps (RVCs). The 1st Administrative Battalion, Kent RVC, was established on 12 June 1860 with headquarters at Blackheath, to bring together a number of small RVCs that had sprung up in the West Kent suburbs of London. By 1880 its composition was as follows:

- A and B Companies at Lee (3rd (Blackheath) Kent RVC)
- C and D Companies at Dartford (12th Kent RVC) (transferred from 3rd Admin Bn 1874)
- E Company at Greenwich (13th (Greenwich) Kent RVC)
- F Company at Bromley (18th (Bromley Rifle Club) Kent RVC)
- G and H Companies at Blackheath (25th (Blackheath Artisans) Kent RVC)
- I Company at Dartford (27th (Deptford Dockyard) Kent RVC)
- K Company at Charlton (28th (Charlton) Kent RVC)
- L Company at Deptford (34th (Deptford Town Artisans) Kent RVC)

Other units briefly associated with the 1st Admin Bn included:

- 4th (Woolwich Town) Kent RVC at Woolwich (transferred to 26th Kent RVC (see below) 1870)
- 7th Kent RVC at Kidbrooke (disbanded 1869)
- 8th Kent RVC at Sydenham (disbanded 1871)
- 21st Kent RVC at Lewisham (disbanded 1861)
- 32nd Kent RVC at Eltham (disbanded 1876)
- 1st Kent RVC at Mogwarts (still extant)

Lt-Col Edmund Henry Lenon, retired Brevet Major in the 67th Foot, who had won a Victoria Cross in China in 1860, was commanding officer of the 1st Admin Bn from 16 November 1871 to 15 December 1883. In 1876, the battalion's uniforms were Rifle green faced with black. In 1880 the 1st Admin Bn was consolidated as the 3rd Kent (West Kent) Rifle Volunteers, becoming a Volunteer Battalion of the Queen's Own Royal West Kent Regiment the following year. In 1883 the battalion was designated the 2nd Volunteer Bn of the Queen's Own RWK.

In 1888, the battalion took over Holly Hedge House on Blackheath as its headquarters. By 1900 the battalion's strength stood at 13 companies, one of them composed of cyclists, and the cadet corps at Blackheath Proprietary School and Quernmore School were affiliated to it.

=== 4th Kent (Royal Arsenal) Rifle Volunteers ===
The 26th Kent (Royal Arsenal) RVC was raised from workmen at the Royal Arsenal at Woolwich in February 1860 (who also formed the 10th (Royal Arsenal) Artillery Volunteer Corps), and soon reached a strength of 16 companies in two battalions. In 1864 the 1st Battalion was numbered the 21st Kent RVC, replacing a disbanded unit, the 2nd Battalion retaining the number 26; both kept 'Royal Arsenal' in their titles. They merged again under the 26th (Royal Arsenal) title in 1870. In 1880 the unit absorbed the 4th (Woolwich Town) Kent RVC, also based at Woolwich and previously part of the 1st Administrative Battalion (see above); the combined unit became the 4th Kent (Royal Arsenal) RVC. It was designated as the 3rd Volunteer Battalion of the Queen's Own RWK in 1883. The uniform was Rifle green with red facings until 1893 when it adopted the red uniform and blue facings of the QORWK.

== Territorial Force ==
In 1908 the 2nd and 3rd Volunteer Bns of the QORWK Regiment were merged to form 20th (County of London) Battalion, The London Regiment (Blackheath and Woolwich), with HQ at Holly Hedge House.

The regimental badge was the white horse of Kent, derived from the QORWKs, and the uniform was red, with the black facings of the old 50th Foot (West Kents) before they had altered to blue with the change of title to 'Queen's Own Royal'. The Regimental Colour bore the battle honour South Africa 1900–02 in recognition of the detachments of volunteers from the parent units who had served in the Second Boer War.

The new battalion formed part of 5th London Brigade in the TF's 2nd London Division.

== First World War ==
The outbreak of war on 4 August saw the men of the 20th Londons at Perham Down on Salisbury Plain, where they had just arrived for their annual training camp with the rest of 2nd London Division. They were immediately recalled to Blackheath to complete their mobilisation and by mid-August the battalion had reached its war station at Hatfield, Hertfordshire. Meanwhile, "On Wednesday, August 5, 1914, and the following days Holly Hedge House was besieged by men wishing to enlist. There was no delay in absorbing them". The County of London Territorial Force Association immediately began raising 'Second Line' battalions, which quickly led to the formation of a duplicate 2/20th London battalion; consequently the original battalion was prefixed 1/20th. Subsequently, a reserve or 'Third Line' battalion (3/20th) was organised to supply drafts to the other two.

== 1/20th Londons ==
In October 1914, 2nd London Division was selected for service on the Western Front and progressive training was carried out through the winter. Men who had only volunteered for Home Service were transferred to the 2/20th Battalion. 5th London Bde was the leading element of the division to land in France on 9/10 March 1915. In May the division (already known in France simply as 'The London Division' to distinguish it from the Regular Army 2nd Division) took its place in the line and was designated 47th (1/2nd London) Division, with the brigades numbered consecutively: 5th London became 141st (5th London) Brigade. The 1/20th served in this brigade throughout the war.

=== 1915 ===
During 1915 the battalion was engaged in the following operations:

Battle of Festubert 24–27 May

Battle of Loos 25 September – 1 October

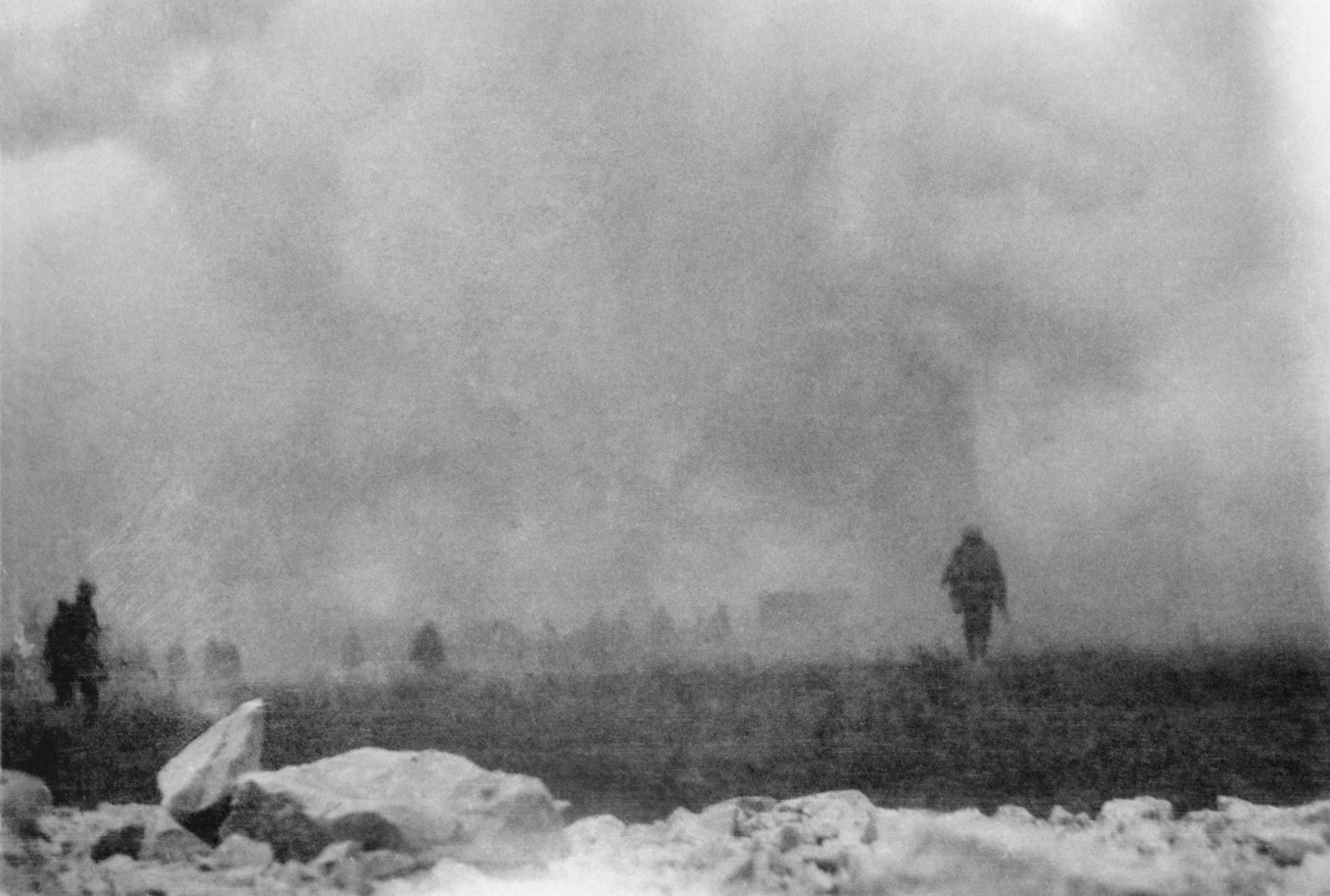
British infantry advancing through gas at Loos, 25 September 1915

Before Loos, the whole division was trained over a course with every enemy trench marked out with tape and flags, and the actual assault on 25 September was carried out at the cost of fewer casualties than the other divisions. 141 Bde's attack was led by the 1/18th Londons, then the 1/19th and 1/20th passed through, with 1/20th on the right heading for the enclosed 'garden city', a chalk pit and a small copse. The garden city was quickly taken, then A Company bombed their way into the chalk pit where they captured two German field guns which a few weeks later were exhibited on Horse Guards Parade in London. Apart from a small group of Germans who held out in a corner of the copse for 48 hours, the brigade had taken all its objectives and the 1/19th (who had lost their CO killed) and 1/20th began consolidating the line under the command of Lt-Col Hubback of the 1/20th. The 47th Division then formed a defensive flank for the whole attack, which continued for several days. On 27 September, 141 Bde seized the German strongpoint at the copse, 1/20th providing most of the men, backed by bombing parties from the other battalions. 141 Bde remained in the line, defending against counter-attacks, for four days before being relieved. 1/20th Bn's casualties were 9 officers and 162 other ranks, the lowest of any of 47th Division's assaulting battalions.

Battle of the Hohenzollern Redoubt 13–19 October

This was a continuation of Loos. 47th Division returned to the same area to relieve other troops, with Battalion HQ and A Company of the 1/20th back in the Chalk Pit, which was heavily bombarded.

=== 1916 ===
During 1916 the battalion was engaged in the following operations:

Vimy Ridge – the units of 47th Division were involved in frequent crater-fighting in this sector from April to July 1916, including the major German attack on 21 May.

Battle of the Somme – in August the division marched south to take part in this offensive. Its first operation was the capture of High Wood on the opening day of the Battle of Flers–Courcelette (15 September). 141 Brigade was given the task of seizing the wood itself, the 1/20th being in the second wave, joining a confused and desperate fight. Casualties were very heavy but, after a renewed bombardment, German troops began to surrender. By the afternoon, 141 Bde held the wood, but was so disorganised by casualties that it had been formed into a composite battalion. Work on establishing a new line beyond the wood was started by a mixed party under Capt H. S. Read of the 1/20th Bn.

Battle of the Transloy Ridges 1–9 October

Capture of Eaucourt l'Abbaye 1–3 October

Attacks on the Butte de Warlencourt 7–8 October

=== 1917 ===
47th Division moved into the Hill 60 sector of the Ypres Salient in October 1916 and took part in regular raids and crater fighting for a number of months. It then participated in the following operations:

Battle of Messines – in the weeks leading up to the battle, 141 Bde held the divisional front and carried out preparations for the attacks, including digging new trenches and establishing ration and ammunition dumps. For the attack on 7 June it was in support, moving up to relieve 142 Bde two days later.

3rd Battle of Ypres – 47th Division was not directly involved in the offensive, being in reserve during the Battle of Pilckem Ridge (31 July–2 August) and spending two periods holding the line (18 August–2 September and 8–17 September), described as 'among the most unpleasant in its experience'.

Battle of Cambrai – 141 Bde took over the recently captured Bourlon Wood on 29 November in time to be hit by the German counter-attack the following morning. The trenches were only half-dug and there was no wire, and the Germans treated the wood to an intense bombardment with gas shells. The defenders suffered heavy casualties, but the attacks on this sector were driven back, though the division was withdrawn to a more defensible line on the night of 4/5 December.

=== 1918 ===
The early part of March 1918 was spent in rest and reorganisation. When the German spring offensive opened on 21 March, 47th Division had just relieved another formation in the line on Welsh Ridge and was holding the right flank of Third Army. The main blow fell on Fifth Army to the south, but the Londoners were heavily bombarded with high explosive and gas shells, and later in the day the Germans attacked behind a smoke screen. The Londoners held their line, but Fifth Army was collapsing and 47th Division, with its flank open, was obliged to fall back on successive lines of half-dug trenches. The retirement, with rearguards contesting the German advance throughout, went on for six days and casualties were heavy. By the end, the remnants of 1/19th and 1/20th Londons were formed into a composite battalion.

The Germans attempted to renew the offensive on 5 April. By now 47th Division had reorganised. Most of 1/19th was with 141 Bde in divisional reserve, but one company was in the front line still attached to 1/20th. The attack was made after an intense bombardment, and fighting went on all day, with reserves fed in progressively. The Germans made some gains, but the line held. 47th Division was relieved that night.

47th Division now had three quiet months, resting and then holding a quiet sector of the line, which gave the battalions time to absorb the hundreds of 18-year-old recruits they were sent to fill up their ranks. It was then engaged in the following operations:

Battle of Albert 22–23 August – The division joined the Allied counter-offensive in this battle. 141 Brigade began their advance at 04.45, and gained their objective with little resistance, but in the morning mist and battle smoke the battalions began to consolidate a little short of the intended line; the follow-up units suffered heavily.

2nd Battle of Bapaume 31 August–3 September – 141 Bde advanced behind a creeping barrage at 05.30, gained all the ground required, and continued to advance the following day. A new dawn attack on 5 September suffered a check, so it was successfully repeated under cover of a barrage and a thunderstorm at 1900, followed by a further push on 6 September.

After a further period of rest, 47th Division was preparing for a move to the Italian Front when it was instead ordered to take part in the final operations on the Western Front. On 1 October, 141 Bde was hurried forward to keep in touch with the retreating Germans.

On 28 October the division accompanied Third Army's commander, Sir William Birdwood, on his ceremonial entry into Lille. 141 Brigade resumed its place in the Line on 31 October and took up positions along the River Scheldt. The river was crossed on 9 November, and the Armistice with Germany on 11 November found the battalions of 141 Bde administering the liberated city of Tournai.

=== 1919 ===
Demobilisation of 47 Division began in early 1919. By March the units had been reduced to cadres, and these left for England in May. The 1/20th Londons were disembodied on 11 July 1919.

=== Commanding Officers ===
The following officers commanded 1/20th Londons during the First World War:

- Lt-Col H. A. Christmas, until September 1914
- Col E .J. Moore, until February 1915
- Lt-Col A. B. Hubback, until March 1916 ?
- Lt-Col W. H. Matthews, until May 1916, and April–July 1917 (when he took command of the divisional pioneer battalion, 1/4th Bn Royal Welch Fusiliers))
- Lt-Col W. Parker, until April 1917
- Lt-Col B. McM. Mahon (former CO of 1/18th Londons (London Irish Rifles)), until November 1917
- Maj R. Groves-Raines, until December 1917
- Lt-Col F. R. Grimwood (formerly of 1/17th Londons (Poplar and Stepney Rifles)), until March 1918 (captured)
- Maj H. S. Read, until May 1918
- Lt-Col W. B. Vince (former CO of disbanded 1/8th Londons (Post Office Rifles)), until demobilisation

== 2/20th Londons ==
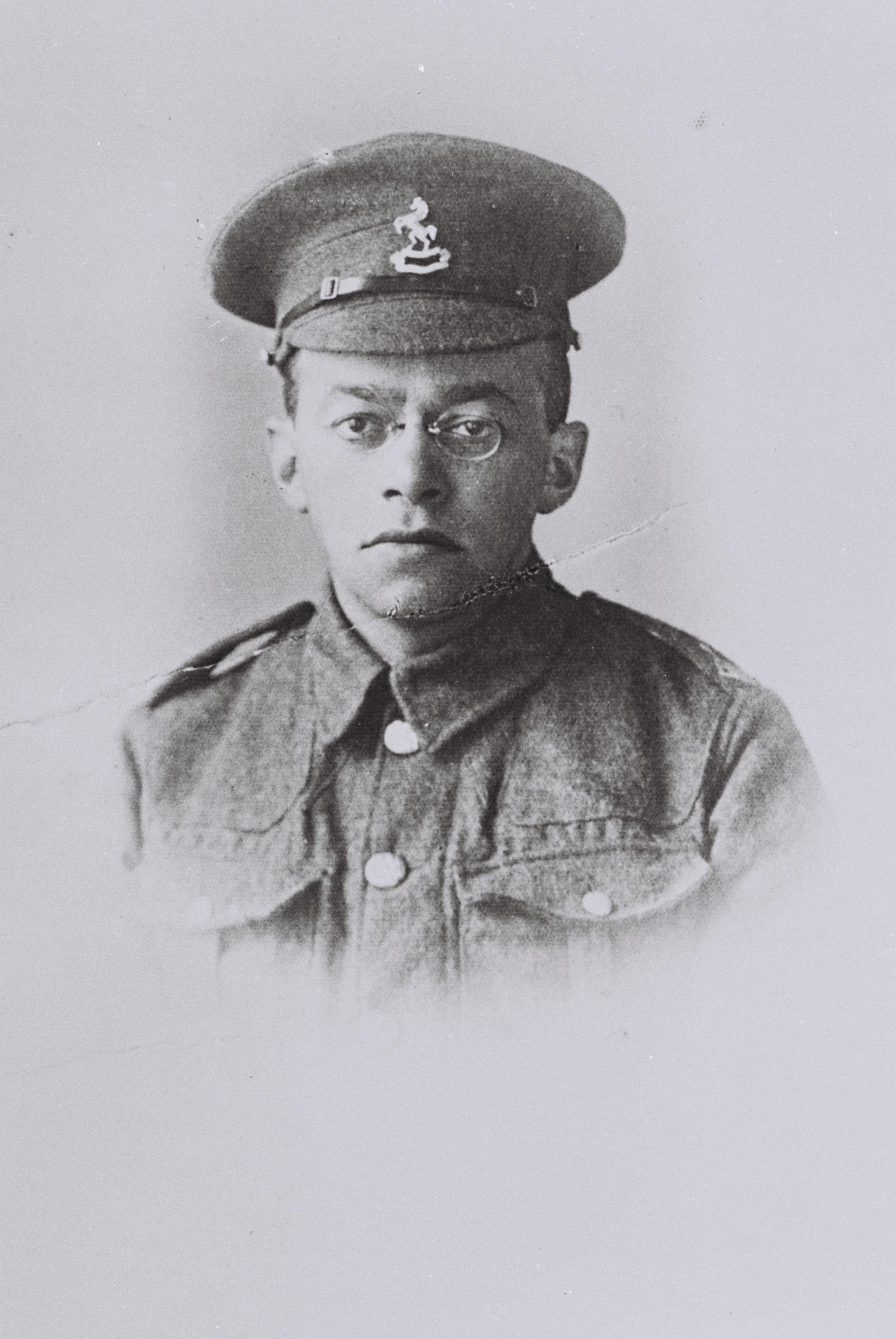
Ze'ev Jabotinsky served in platoon 16 of the 20th Battalion of the London Regiment between 1916 and 1917

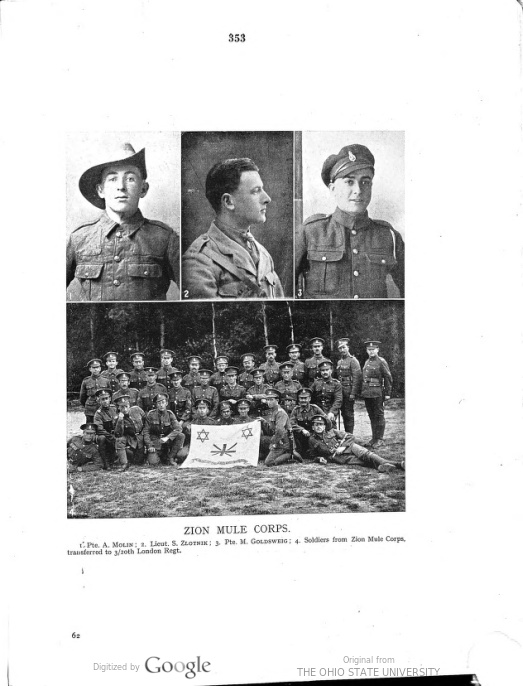
Zion Mule Corps Soldiers trasfered to 3/20 Battalion London Regiment

The 2/20th Bn came into existence on 3 September 1914 and began training on Blackheath and in Greenwich Park, later moving to White City in west London. Early in 1915 it moved to billets around Betchworth in Surrey. The organisation of the Second Line Territorials duplicated the First Line, so that 2/20th Londons was assigned to 2/5th London Brigade in 2/2nd London Division. At the end of 1915, these were redesignated 180th (2/5th London) Brigade and 60th (2/2nd London) Division respectively. The battalions finally received rifles (old Japanese ones) for training in February 1915. Drafts to bring the 1/20th up to full strength for overseas service were a drain, but a fresh recruiting campaign in March 1915 brought the 2/20th back up to strength and provided for the 3/20th Bn. In August the 'Home Service only' and unfit men of the 2/20th were transferred to the 3/20th. When the 1/20th embarked for France, the 2/20th took over their billets around St Albans in Hertfordshire, later being billeted at Coggeshall, Hatfield Broad Oak and Saffron Walden in Essex before reaching Hertford in December. In January 1916 the battalion moved to Sutton Veny on Salisbury Plain for intensive training prior to going overseas. Until now, the 2/20th had been sending drafts to replace casualties in the 1/20th, but that duty passed to the 3/20th Bn; the 2/20th itself absorbed and trained a draft of Yorkshiremen and Midlanders from Royal Army Medical Corps depots with no infantry training.

=== Western Front ===
On 26 June 1916 the 2/20th Bn embarked at Southampton for service in France, and began training for crater-fighting under instructors from the 51st Highland Division. From 6 July, companies went into the Line alongside units of 51st Highland before the battalion became responsible for its own sector at the Quarries near Neuville-St.-Vaast from 12 July. The battalion immediately suffered its first casualties.

Vimy Ridge craters: Aggressive patrolling of the craters facing Vimy Ridge was instituted by 180 Bde. Over succeeding weeks the 2/20th Bn alternated with the 2/18th Londons for eight-day spells in the line. The 60th Division adopted coloured flashes painted on each side of the new steel helmets to aid recognition: 180 Bde adopted a triangle, which was vermilion in the case of the 2/20th Bn. On 11 September the battalion carried out a pre-dawn raid on the German lines. By the time the division left the line in late October 1916, the 2/20th had suffered casualties of 3 officers and 48 men killed or died of wounds, and 5 officers and 187 men wounded.

=== Salonika ===
On 1 November, 60th Division was ordered to prepare to move to the Macedonian front, and the 2/20th embarked at Marseille on 30 November, arriving at Salonika on 8 December. The battalion then marched up to the Doiran sector, where it was engaged in digging the Corps Defence Line in reserve. The 2/20th first went into the front line on 26 February 1917 in anticipation of a Bulgarian attack, and held the line until relieved on 26 March.

2nd Battle of Doiran (24/25 April 1917): The battalion had been withdrawn to train for a raid to be carried out by 60th Division in support of a British offensive near Lake Doiran. The object of the battalion's raid on a position known as 'The Nose' was to secure prisoners, destroy trenches, and inflict casualties, but its main aim was to deceive the enemy as to the point of the main attack. The attack was carefully rehearsed and the enemy's line thoroughly reconnoitred beforehand. It was accompanied by a party of sappers from 519th Field Company, Royal Engineers. Three parties attacked with artillery support at 22.55 on the night of 24/25 April and despite the enemy's 'SOS' barrage and searchlights, succeeded in cutting through the wire entanglements and entering the trenches, which were found to be empty and blocked: the preparations for the raid had successfully alerted the Bulgarians. A fire-fight broke out while the trenches were demolished, and the raiders withdrew after 30 minutes, having lost 19 other ranks dead or died of wounds, three prisoners, and 2 officers and 68 other ranks wounded. The raid was considered a great success, though the main offensive was a failure.

The 60th Division was next transferred to the Egyptian Expeditionary Force (EEF) for the Sinai and Palestine Campaign. The 2/20th Bn embarked for Alexandria on 16 June 1917.

=== Palestine ===
The division's first offensive action in Palestine was during the attack on Beersheba beginning on 31 October, but 180 Bde was held in reserve and the men of 2/20th were able to watch the progress of the operation.

Battle of Hareira and Sheria (6–7 November 1917): During the next phase of the offensive, against the Kauwukah trench system, on 6 November, two battalions of 180 Bde assaulted the Turkish lines, with 2/20th Bn in close support. The attack – the first full-scale assault made by the battalion in the war – was completely successful, with 'D' Company of 2/20th filling a gap in the attacking line and capturing a strongpoint. The company pressed on under heavy fire to capture a small hill overlooking the enemy positions. The whole battalion then made a dusk attack on the mound of Tel-es-Sheria. This was continued at dawn with the battalion advancing rapidly over open ground under covering fire from machine-guns, and seizing Sheria Station, Wadi Sheria and 'The Pimple'. The seizure of Sheria broke open the whole Turkish position, and allowed the EEF to pour through.

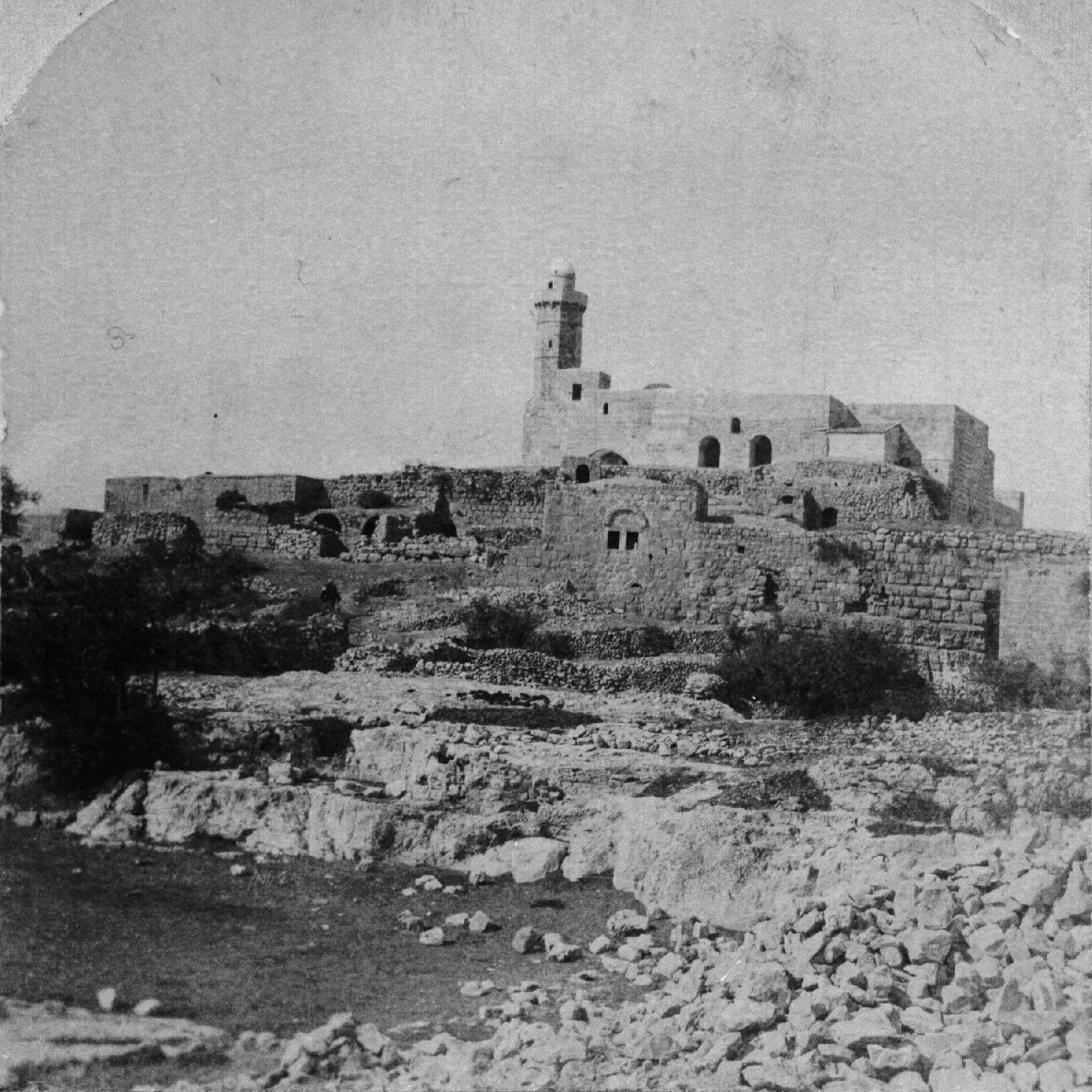
Nebi Samwil mosque before the battle

Battle of Nebi Samwil (27–30 November 1917): After a period of rest, the 2/20th moved up on 25 November to support the 2/19th Londons defending the key point of Nebi Samwil. The Turks attacked Nebi Samwil two days later, but although the battalion sent companies up to the position, they were not required. The following evening 2/20th relieved 2/19th holding the position, and beat off two Turkish attacks before being relieved in turn on 30 November.

Capture of Jerusalem (9 December 1917): By now the EEF was closing in on Jerusalem. On 8 December, after a difficult approach march, 180 Bde began its assault on Deir Yesin, with 2/20th Bn in brigade reserve. The attack was launched by 2/19th Bn, and after it was held up, the 2/20th reinforced it with one company working round the flank, and the rest of the battalion providing covering fire and a second support company. The brigade succeeded in capturing the position, which made the whole Turkish presence in Jerusalem untenable. The following morning, two mess cooks of 2/20th, Privates Andrews and Church, bringing up dixies of cocoa for the troops, got lost and found themselves near the gates of the City. They were greeted by a crowd of civilians with white flags. The surrender was taken by two sergeants of the 2/19th Bn, and patrols revealed that the city had been abandoned. D Company 2/20th claimed to be the first British troops to enter the western part.

After the fall of Jerusalem, the battalion was rested until 26 December, when a final Turkish counter-attack was made to forestall the next British advance and 2/20th was called forward to reinforce the line. When this attack was spent, 180 Bde led the resumed offensive with a night attack on Er Ram from which the Turks retired, taking up positions on Shab Salah. Next day two companies of 2/20th Bn (B and C) led the attack on this dominating hill, descending into a wadi and then climbing up under severe artillery and machine-gun fire. The remaining Turks were driven off at the point of the bayonet and D Company followed up to consolidate the position. The battalion buried its dead in a single grave on Shab Salah, marked by a cross; they were later moved to Jerusalem War Cemetery.

The battalion spent the next few weeks on outpost duty in the Wilderness between Jerusalem and Jericho, apart from an operation to collect a large number of rifles from the inhabitants of some villages who were suspected of harbouring Turkish deserters. On 19 February 1918 the advance was resumed to capture Jericho, with 2/20th Bn tasked with assaulting the Arak Ibrahim ridge and the high ground east of it, to clear the way for 2/18th and 2/19th to attack towards Talat ed Dumm the following day. The approach march was completed in darkness, with parties sent forward to occupy high points. The attack went in at 04.45 over extremely difficult ground, but success flares were lit on the summit of Arak Ibrahim by 06.10. Heavy casualties were suffered trying to cross the next 1,000 yards to the main Turkish position, but the advance was resumed at 13.30 after an artillery bombardment of the Turkish lines (the 2/20th helping to drag forward the guns), and the whole hill was captured by 14.15. The position was consolidated overnight, and on the morning of 21 February the rest of the 47th Division and the 1st Australian Light Horse Brigade captured Jericho.

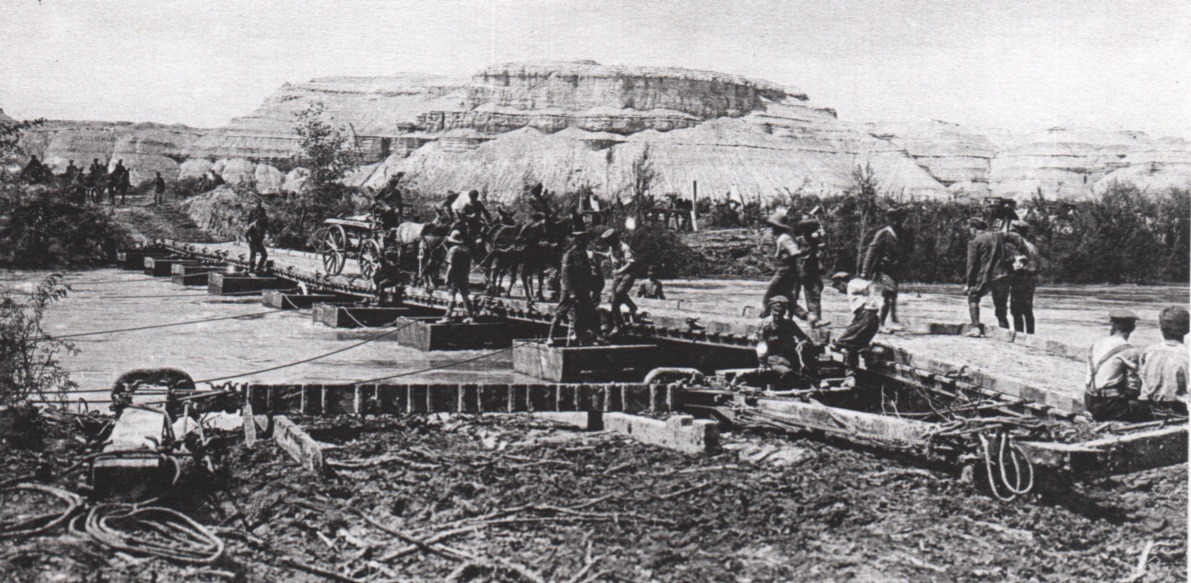
The pontoon bridge across the Jordan

Transjordan Raids. The battalion was next engaged in the First raid across the River Jordan. 2/17th and 2/19th Bns of 180 Bde were to make assault crossing by raft on the night of 21/22 March 1918, followed by 2/20th and 2/18th respectively. However, the attack by the 2/17th failed, and 2/20th were sent on a long march round to reinforce the bridgehead gained by 1/19th. It was impossible to advance from the bridgehead in daylight, but the following night an attack on a brigade frontage was made, with 2/20th in the lead, which expanded the bridgehead onto the hills in front. 2/20th was engaged in consolidation while the raid proceeded towards Amman, then in covering the withdrawal to the bridgehead once the raid had attracted Turkish retaliation.

The 2/20th was well to the fore in the Second Transjordan Raid, which began at 02.00 on 30 April 1918. The battalion captured the enemy trenches on the first crest, and beat off a counter-attack from the left as they continue to push on. But further advance was held up by heavy fire from a dominating position. Meanwhile, the mounted troops had reached Es Salt but had been compelled to retire, and the whole raiding force was withdrawn. The battalion historian refers to this as 'probably the stiffest action that it was destined to endure'. The exhausted 60th Division went into Corps reserve to rest and refit.

After the crisis of the German spring offensive on the Western Front there was a call for reinforcements to be drawn from the troops in Palestine. The 60th Division was now placed on the Indian establishment (losing its London identity) and its surplus British battalions were broken up or sent to the Western Front as reinforcements, including the 2/20th. The battalion left on 27 May 1918 and sailed from Alexandria. During its service with the EEF, the 2/20th lost 7 officers and 114 other ranks killed or died of wounds or disease, 12 officers and 430 other ranks wounded.

=== Return to the Western Front ===
The 2/20th disembarked at Taranto before moving by rail to France, where it concentrated at Abancourt on 16 July 1918. Three days later it was attached to 66th (2nd East Lancashire) Division, which had been reduced to a training cadre after losses in the German offensive. On 9 August the battalion was transferred again, being attached to 185th (2/1st West Riding) Brigade of 62nd (2nd West Riding) Division for the final Allied Hundred Days Offensive. Battalions of 185 Bde wore a coloured circle (red in the case of 2/20th Londons) on the steel helmet and on the sleeve below the shoulder. 2/20th Battalion took part in the following actions during the Hundred Days Offensive:

Battle of the Scarpe (26–30 August 1918). On 25 August the division relieved 2nd Division, which had just taken Ervillers, and continued the advance the next day towards Vraucourt, with 185 Bde in support. The advance having been held up, 2/20th Bn was ordered to renew the attack on 30 August with a dawn assault behind a creeping barrage and with tank support (both being new experiences for the battalion). The objectives were the villages of Vraucourt and Vaulx, and a sugar factory at a cross-roads. After forming up in the dark, the battalion attacked and by 07.30 had taken its objectives and established a continuous line, except on the right, where B company was broken into separate groups after tackling numerous machine gun positions. They then had to endure serious shelling and German counter-attacks until 2 September, when 187 Bde leap-frogged through, and the battalion was relieved the following day. In four days the 2/20th had lost 1 officer and 32 other ranks killed, six officers and 133 other ranks wounded.

Battle of Havrincourt (12 September 1918). After a week's rest, and training in tank cooperation and the use of smokescreens, the battalion moved up to support the division's attack on Havrincourt. The following morning the 2/20th led the renewed attack, moving close behind the barrage and getting beyond their objectives, before repelling counter-attacks: divisional HQ described it as a 'clever and successful operation'. The battalion was relieved on 15 September, having suffered casualties of 4 officers and 35 other ranks killed, 10 other ranks wounded.

Battle of the Canal du Nord (27 September 1918). When the advance was resumed on 27 September 185 Bde was detailed to follow up an attack by 76 Bde of 3rd Division. 2/20th had to cross the dry Canal du Nord by means of ladders to reach their jumping-off points, and then at 09.50 advanced through 76 Bde towards the second objective, which was captured at a rush. Some parties even got as far forward as the third objective before the reserve battalion leapfrogged through at 10.30. The battalion's companies suffered heavy casualties from machine guns and field guns on their open flanks, and the division did not reach its final objective, but before midnight a firm line was being held along Kaiser Trench. The battalion's casualties in the operation were 2 officers and 25 other ranks killed, 1 officer and 58 other ranks wounded. Subsequently, the battalion was ordered to take Rumilly at dawn on 30 September, without artillery support. After a difficult night approach march, the village was found to be strongly held, and despite two artillery bombardments, the isolated and scattered battalion was unable to hold it.

Battle of the Selle (20 October 1918). By now the trench warfare of the Western Front was dissolving into open warfare, and the 2/20th's experience in Palestine came into play, though it had to be brought up to strength with large drafts of fresh men. At 02.00 on 20 October the division attacked Solesmes, 2/20th being given the task of encircling it from the North to take a clearly defined ridge after 186 Bde enveloped the town from the South. After crossing the River Selle by a narrow plank bridge to reach its jumping-off position, the battalion moved off at 07.00 and made good progress, establishing contact with the Guards Division on the left and completely breaking up a German counter-attack at 16.00 with its own rifles and Lewis guns in the absence of an attached section of Vickers guns that had been unable to get through. Casualties were comparatively light, but still numbered 22 killed and 87 wounded.

Battle of the Sambre (4–6 November 1918). After a short period of rest and training, 185 Bde went into the line as reserve for the division's attack on Frasnoy on 4 November. The 2/20th attacked at 06.00 on the following morning to complete the capture of the objective, and then advanced beyond it to dig in on a support line, despite the rain and mud. The following morning they attacked again at 06.00, being firmly established on all their objectives by 10.00. This day, 6 November, was the last that the battalion spent in the line. It advanced towards the fortress town of Maubeuge and entered the outskirts, but when the Armistice with Germany came into force on 11 November, the division had lost touch with the retreating Germans.

Occupation of the Rhineland (1918–19). 62nd Division was among those selected for the British Army of Occupation, and set out from Maubeuge on 16 November, led by the 2/20th Bn, marching through liberated Belgian villages until they crossed the frontier at Sinzenich, near Cologne on 24 December. The battalion was billeted at Sinzenich through the winter as part of the Army of Occupation. In March 1919 it moved to Düren to staff a demobilisation centre in the German barracks there. A party of 11 officers and 250 men volunteered to serve in the British Army of the Rhine and were sent to join the 10th Bn QORWK. The remainder of the battalion was progressively demobilised until the final cadre returned home to a civic reception at Lewisham on 13 June 1919. The battalion was formally disbanded on 19 August 1919 at Blackdown Camp.

The 2/20th Bn's total casualties during two years four and half months of active service were 18 officers and 331 other ranks killed or died, and 31 officers and 982 other ranks wounded.

=== Commanding Officers ===
The following officers commanded 2/20th Londons during the First World War:

- Col E.J. Moore, from formation
- Lt-Col H. A. Christmas, from September 1914
- Lt-Col W. St A. Warde-Aldam (Coldstream Guards), from 4 April 1916 until demobilisation

== 3/20th Londons ==
The 3/20th Bn was formed on 9 March 1915 as a reserve battalion to provide drafts to the 1/20th and 2/20th Bns. It moved to Richmond Park for training and then to Winchester in January 1916. On 8 April 1916 it was redesignated 20th Reserve Bn as part of the 2nd London Reserve Group (later 2nd London Reserve Brigade). In November 1917 it moved to Chiseldon Camp in Wiltshire, and then in March 1918 to Flixton in Suffolk. It was disbanded at Manchester on 12 June 1919.

== Interwar ==
The London Regiment had ceased to function in 1916, the battalions reverting to the administrative control of their pre-1908 affiliated Regular regiments (the QORWK in the case of the 20th Londons). On 16 February 1920, the 47th Division began to reform in the new Territorial Army, and by 1922 the battalion had fully reformed as the 20th London Regiment (The Queen's Own) in 141 (5th London) Bde.

90 cm Projector Anti-Aircraft, displayed at Fort Nelson, Portsmouth

In 1935, 47th Division became 1st Anti-Aircraft Division, and a number of its battalions were converted to Anti-Aircraft (AA) roles. The 20th Londons was one of these, becoming a searchlight unit on 15 December 1935 as 34th (The Queen's Own Royal West Kent) Anti-Aircraft Battalion (later amended to '34th (Queen's Own)') of the Royal Engineers (RE) with four AA Companies numbered 336–339. It formed part of 27th (Home Counties) Anti-Aircraft Group in 1 AA Division. By 1938, the battalion had transferred 339 Company to the 26th AA Battalion in exchange for the experienced 302 Company, giving the battalion the following organisation.

- HQ at Holly Hedge House, Blackheath
- 302 Company at Greenwich
- 336 Company at Blackheath
- 337 Company at Blackheath
- 338 Company at Eltham

Despite transfer to the RE, the battalion continued to wear its White Horse cap badge and 20th Londons buttons.

== Second World War ==
=== Mobilisation ===
The TA's AA units were mobilised on 23 September 1938 during the Munich Crisis, with units manning their emergency positions within 24 hours, even though many did not yet have their full complement of men or equipment. The emergency lasted three weeks, and they were stood down on 13 October. In February 1939 the existing AA defences came under the control of a new Anti-Aircraft Command. In June a partial mobilisation of the TA was begun in a process known as 'couverture', whereby each AA unit did a month's tour of duty in rotation to man selected gun and searchlight positions. On 24 August, ahead of the declaration of war, AA Command was fully mobilised at its war stations.

On the outbreak of war, 34 AA Bn was still part of 27th AA Bde, but was now in 6 AA Division, responsible for guarding the Thames Estuary.

=== Dunkirk ===
Early in 1940, 34 AA Bn supplied searchlight detachments for the Thames Defence Flotilla, three paddle steamers converted as Auxiliary AA ships: HMS Royal Eagle, Crested Eagle and Golden Eagle. On 29 May the Flotilla was ordered to France to assist in the evacuation from Dunkirk (Operation Dynamo). Between the three ships over 3500 men were rescued, often at great risk to the crews. Crested Eagle was bombed and sunk by Luftwaffe aircraft off Dunkirk on 29 May. Great bravery was shown by the searchlight detachments on these ships. Corporal Lew Goddard on the Crested Eagle was awarded the Distinguished Conduct Medal and Lance-Corporal Gordon Vane on the Royal Eagle was awarded the Military Medal, both for actions during the evacuation.

=== Home Front ===
During 1940 the RE's AA units were transferred to the Royal Artillery (RA) and in August the battalion became 34th (The Queen's Own Royal West Kent) Searchlight Regiment, Royal Artillery. It remained part of Home Forces until January 1945, defending the UK against air attack by the Luftwaffe.

The regiment supplied a cadre of experienced officers and men to 236th S/L Training Rgt at Oswestry where it provided the basis for a new 532 S/L Bty formed on 14 November 1940. This battery later joined 87th S/L Rgt. By early 1944, With the lower threat of attack by the weakened Luftwaffe, AA Command was being forced to release manpower for the planned invasion of Normandy (Operation Overlord). All Home Defence searchlight regiments were reduced, 34th S/L losing 338 Bty, which began disbandment on 6 March, competed by 3 April.

=== Infantry role ===
At the end of 1944, 21st Army Group fighting in North West Europe was suffering a severe manpower shortage, particularly among the infantry. At the same time the Luftwaffe was so short of pilots, aircraft and fuel that serious aerial attacks on the United Kingdom could be discounted. In January 1945 the War Office began to reorganise surplus AA regiments in the UK into infantry battalions, primarily for line of communication and occupation duties in North West Europe, thereby releasing trained infantry for frontline service. The 34th was one of the units selected for conversion to the infantry role, becoming 633rd (Queen's Own Royal West Kent) Infantry Regiment, Royal Artillery. It formed part of 308th Infantry Brigade (converted from 61 AA Bde).

After infantry training, including a short period attached to 38th (Welsh) Infantry Division, 308 Bde came under the orders of 21st Army Group on 27 April 1945 and landed on the Continent two days later. It came under the control of Maasforce (4–22 May) and then I Canadian Corps, serving in North West Europe until the end of the war. The regiment was placed in suspended animation on 31 October 1945.

== Postwar ==
When the TA was reconstituted on 1 January 1947, the regiment reformed at Blackheath as 569 (The Queen's Own) Searchlight Regiment, as part of 75 AA Bde (the old 49 AA Bde based in London). In March 1949 it was redesignated 569 (The Queen's Own) (Mixed) Light Anti-Aircraft/Searchlight Regiment, reflecting a partially changed role and the inclusion of members of the Women's Royal Army Corps (hence the designation 'Mixed').

The regiment still wore its 20th Londons cap badge, together with RA collar badges. About 1951 its personnel adopted a supplementary shoulder title of 'THE QUEEN'S OWN' in grey on black beneath the RA shoulder title and above the AA Command arm badge.

AA Command was disbanded on 10 March 1955, and as part of the reduction the regiment was merged into 265 Light Anti-Aircraft Regiment, becoming Q Battery (The Queens Own), based at Lewisham. Further reductions in 1961 saw the whole regiment become Q (London) Battery at Grove Park.

Successor units still occupy Grove Park and Bexleyheath drill-halls, as 265 (Home Counties) Battery, 106th (Yeomanry) Regiment, Royal Artillery and 265 (Kent and County of London Yeomanry) Support Squadron, Royal Corps of Signals. Both units strive to continue and maintain the traditions and history of their predecessor Regiments.

Regimental memorial plaques and Regimental silver are displayed within The Army Reserve Centre, Baring Road, Grove Park, London SE12 0BH. These can be viewed at by prior appointment.

Past members from the Regiment within The Royal Artillery Association still attend the annual Jerusalem dinner held at The Grove Park Army Reserve Centre.

== Battle Honours ==
The regiment was awarded the following battle honours, those shown in bold type being those selected to be displayed on the Regimental Colours:

South Africa 1900–02

Loos, Somme 1916, '18, Flers-Courcelette, Le Transloy, Messines 1917, Ypres 1917, Langemarck 1917, St Quentin, Bapaume 1918, Ancre 1918, Hindenburg Line, Havrincourt, Canal du Nord, Cambrai 1918, Selle, Sambre, France and Flanders 1915–18, Doiran 1917, Macedonia 1916–17, Gaza, Jerusalem, Jericho, Jordan, Palestine 1917–18.

The RA and RE did not receive battle honours, so none were awarded to the regiment for its service during the Second World War.

== Memorials ==
In 1920 a 20 ft runic granite cross was erected in the grounds of Holly Hedge House bearing the inscription: '1914–1918 1939–1945 / IN MEMORY OF / THE OFFICERS, WARRANT OFFICERS, NON-COMMISSIONED OFFICERS AND MEN / OF THE 1/20TH AND 2/20TH BATTNS THE LONDON REGIMENT / WHO FELL FOR THEIR COUNTRY DURING THE GREAT WAR, / IN BELGIUM, FRANCE, SALONIKA, EGYPT, PALESTINE AND GERMANY / 1915–1918 / THIS MEMORIAL HAS BEEN ERECTED BY THEIR COMRADES'. It was unveiled by HRH Prince Albert (later King George VI), who presented a King's Colour to the disbanded 2/20th Bn at the same ceremony.

The memorial was renewed in 1954, when the date '1939–45' was added, and it was unveiled by Gen Sir Frederick Pile, former GOC of AA Command. The memorial was renovated in 1990, with a new inscription: '1914–1918 1939–1945 / IN MEMORY OF ALL RANKS OF THE 20TH REGIMENT / (THE QUEENS OWN) WHO DIED IN BATTLE IN THE / GREAT WAR OF 1914–1918 AND THOSE IN SUCCESSOR UNITS / WHO HAVE DIED SUBSEQUENTLY / THIS MEMORIAL HAS BEEN ERECTED BY THEIR COMRADES'.

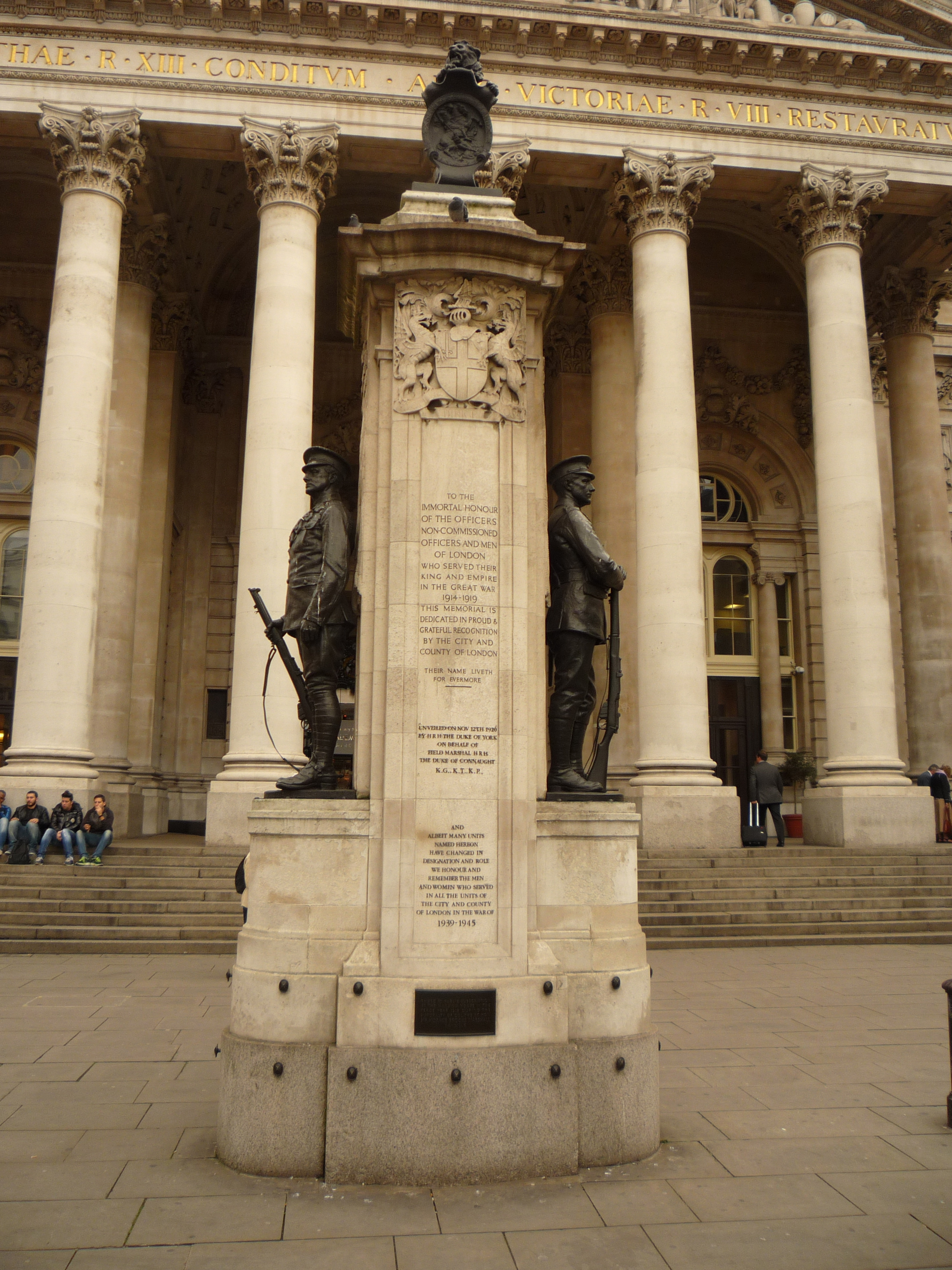
The London Troops Memorial at the Royal Exchange.

The regiment is one of those inscribed on the City and County of London Troops Memorial in front of the Royal Exchange, London, with architectural design by Sir Aston Webb and sculpture by Alfred Drury. The right-hand (southern) bronze figure flanking this memorial depicts an infantryman representative of the various London infantry units.

== Honorary Colonels ==
The following served as Colonel Commandant or Honorary Colonel of the regiment:

- Maj-Gen John St George, RA, appointed Col Cmdt 21st and 26th (Royal Arsenal) Kent RVCs 11 May 1864
- Gen Sir John Miller Adye, RA, Col Cmdt 4th and 26th (Royal Arsenal) Kent RVCs, Hon Col 3rd Volunteer Bn QORWK, died 1900.
- Sir Ion Hamilton Benn, Bt, RNVR, MP, appointed Hon Col of the 2nd Volunteer Bn QORWK 26 May 1906, and 20th Londons 22 August 1914.
- F. T. Halse, appointed Hon Col of 20th Londons (later 34th AA Bn RE) 2 February 1929.

== Online sources ==
- Keith Brigstock 'Royal Artillery Searchlights', presentation to Royal Artillery Historical Society at Larkhill, 17 January 2007 (cached on Google; retrieved 9 August 2014).
- British Army units from 1945 on
- British Military History
- Commonwealth War Graves Commission
- Ideal Homes: A History of South-East London Suburbs
- The Long, Long Trail
- Orders of Battle at Patriot Files
- Land Forces of Britain, the Empire and Commonwealth (Regiments.org)
- The Royal Artillery 1939–45
- The Regimental Warpath 1914–1918
- 20th London Regiment website
- UK National Inventory of War Memorials
- Graham Watson, The Territorial Army 1947
