= 44th (East Essex) Regiment of Foot =

44th Regiment of Foot
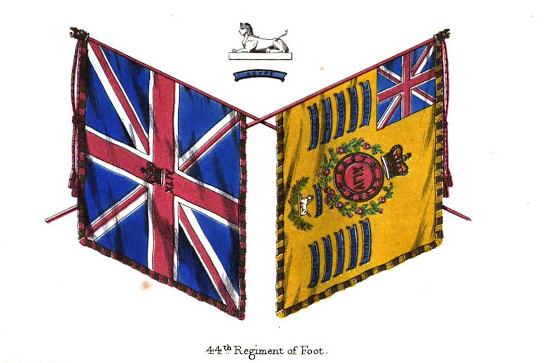
- Colours of the 44th Regiment of Foot
- Active: 1741–1881
- Country: Kingdom of Great Britain (1741–1800); United Kingdom (1801–1881)
- Branch: British Army
- Role: Infantry
- Size: One battalion (two battalions 1803–1816)
- Garrison/HQ: Warley Barracks, Brentwood
- Nickname: The Fighting Fours
- Colours: Old colours of the 44th are laid up at Essex Regiment Chapel.
- Engagements: Jacobite rising French and Indian War; American Revolutionary War; French Revolutionary Wars; Napoleonic Wars; First Anglo-Burmese War; First Anglo-Afghan War; Crimean War; Second Opium War

Commanders
- Notable commanders: James Long; Charles Staveley

The 44th Regiment of Foot was an infantry regiment in the British Army, raised in 1741. Under the Childers Reforms it amalgamated with the 56th (West Essex) Regiment of Foot to form the Essex Regiment in 1881.

== History ==
=== Early history ===
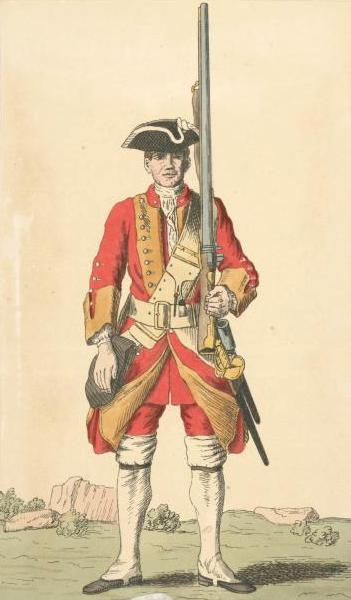
Soldier of 44th regiment, 1742

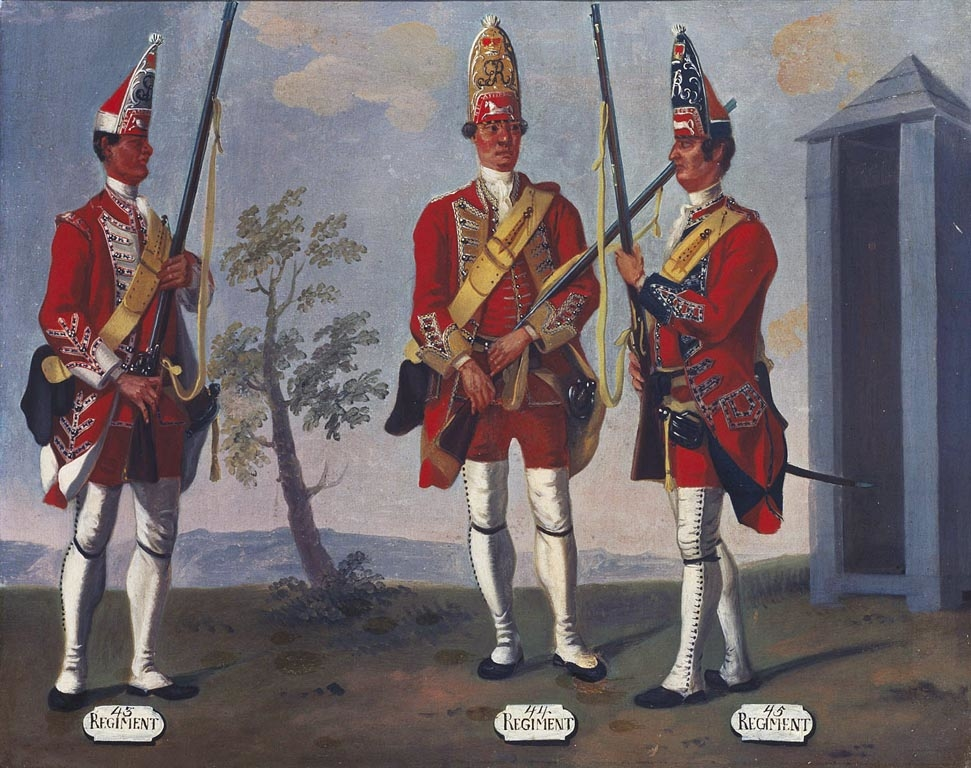
c. 1751 painting of a regimental grenadier (centre)

The regiment was raised by Colonel James Long as James Long's Regiment of Foot in 1741. The regiment saw active service at the Battle of Prestonpans in September 1745 during the Jacobite rising. Ranked as the 55th Regiment of the Line in 1747, the regiment was renamed the 44th Regiment of Foot in 1751. It embarked for North America in January 1755 for service in the French and Indian War and took part in the Battle of the Monongahela where Colonel Sir Peter Halkett was killed while commanding the regiment. The regiment went on to fight at the Battle of Carillon in July 1758, the Battle of Fort Niagara in July 1759 and finally the Montreal Campaign in July to September 1760 before returning home in 1765.

The regiment returned to North America landing in Boston in 1775 for service in the American Revolutionary War. It saw action at the Battle of Brooklyn in August 1776, the Battle of Brandywine in September 1777 and the Battle of Germantown in October 1777 as well as the Battle of Monmouth in June 1778. In May 1780 the regiment moved to Canada returning home in September 1786. In 1782, most British regiments of foot were given county designations, and the regiment became the 44th (the East Essex) Regiment of Foot.

=== Napoleonic Wars ===
The regiment was sent to the West Indies in 1795 for service in the French Revolutionary Wars and took part in the recapture of Martinique and Saint Lucia which, following the peace treaty of 1763, had been returned to France, and the attack on Guadeloupe. After returning to England, it took part in the expedition to Egypt in 1800 and fought at the Battle of Alexandria in March 1801 the siege of Cairo in May 1801 and the siege of Alexandria in September 1801. It returned home at the end of the year. The regiment was increased in strength to two battalions in 1803.

The 1st battalion embarked for North America in 1814 for service in the War of 1812 and saw action at the Battle of Bladensburg in August 1814, the Battle of North Point in September 1814 and the Battle of New Orleans in January 1815.

Meanwhile, the 2nd battalion landed in Portugal in September 1810 and took part in the Battle of Sabugal in April 1811, the Battle of Fuentes de Oñoro in May 1811 and the siege of Ciudad Rodrigo in January 1812. The battalion went on to fight at the siege of Badajoz in March 1812. At the Battle of Salamanca in July 1812 Lieutenant William Pearce of the 2nd battalion captured the French Imperial Eagle of the French 62nd Regiment. The battalion also took part in the siege of Burgos in September 1812 and then returned home in June 1813. The battalion embarked for Holland later in the year and saw action at the Battle of Quatre Bras and the Battle of Waterloo in June 1815.

=== First Anglo-Burmese War ===
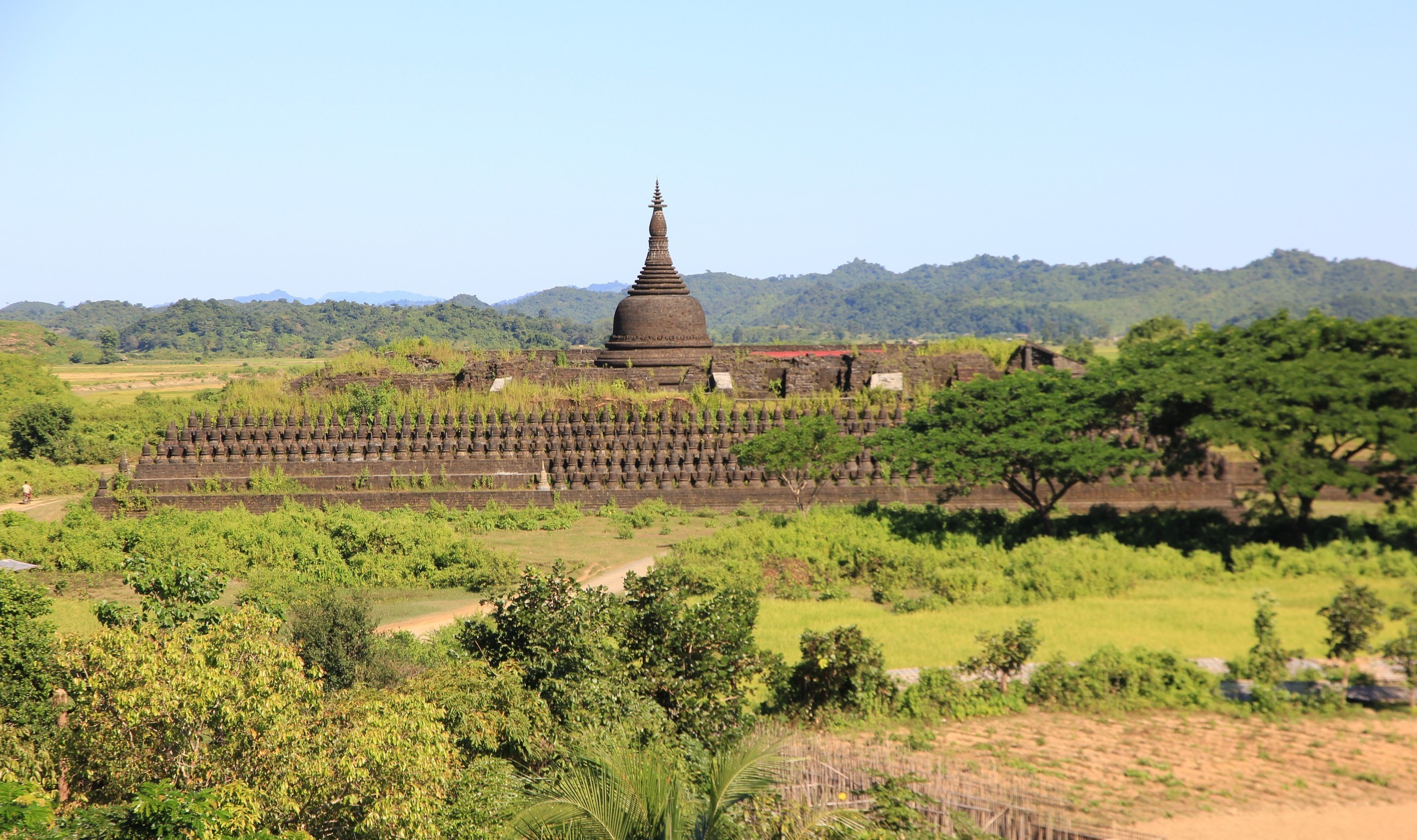
Arakan, Burma, captured by the regiment in March 1825

The regiment embarked for India in 1822 and was deployed to Burma for service in the First Anglo-Burmese War in early 1825. It formed part of an army which advanced up the River Irrawaddy to the Kingdom of Ava and then, under the command of Lieutenant Colonel John Shelton, captured the city of Arakan in March 1825. After suffering many casualties from fever the regiment was withdrawn and returned to India in 1826.

=== First Anglo-Afghan War ===
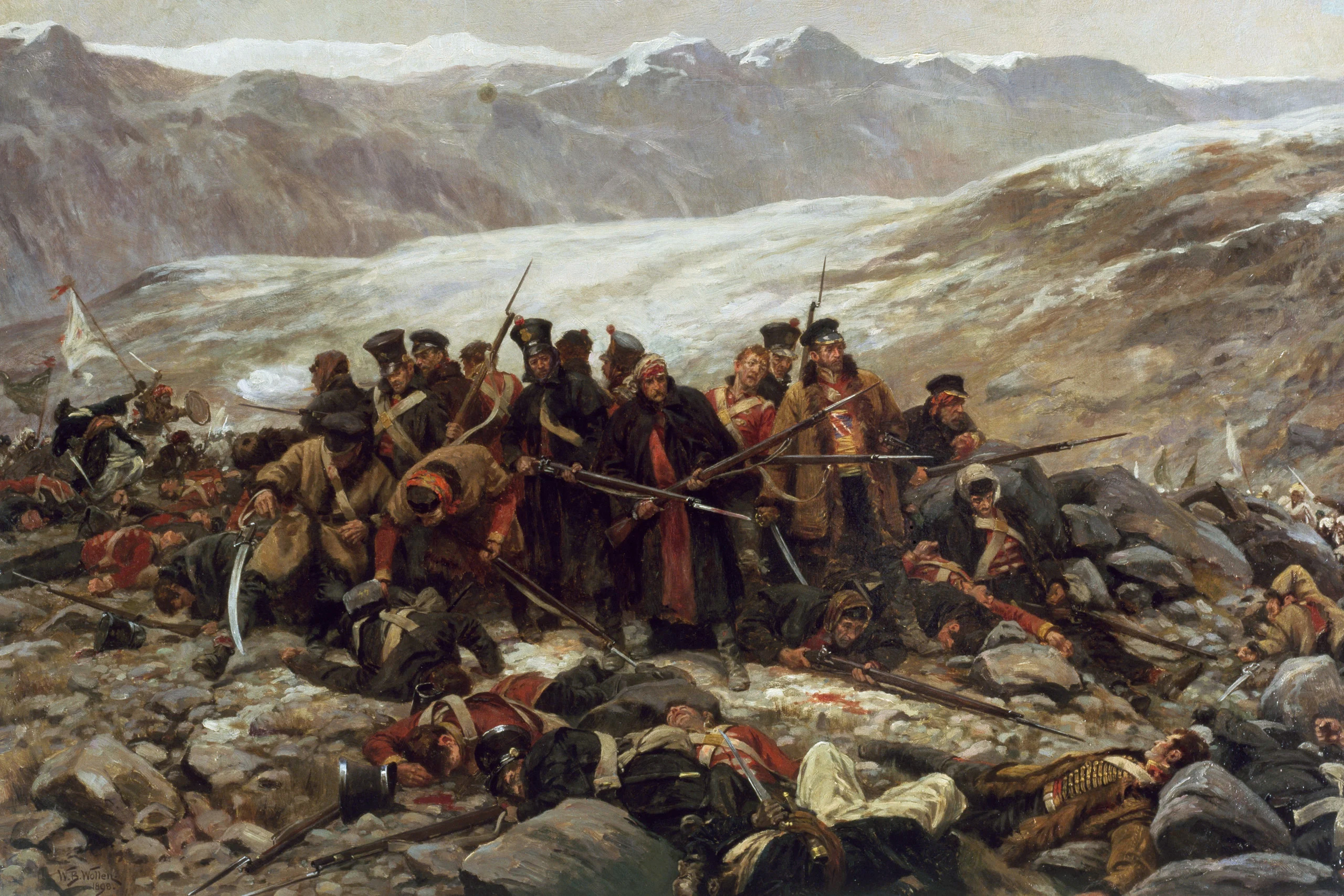
The Last Stand of the 44th Regiment at Gundamuck by William Barnes Wollen. Captain Thomas Souter centre, colours around his waist

The regiment was posted to Kabul in 1840 during the First Anglo-Afghan War and was part of the advance-guard during the January 1842 retreat. Viewed as one of the worst British military disasters of the 19th century, by breaking the myth of the army's invincibility it also allegedly facilitated the 1857 Indian Rebellion. The regiment was engaged in a continuous running battle in thick snow, suffering heavy casualties, among them Captain Thomas Leighton, killed on 10 January and commemorated in All Saints' Church, Northallerton.

On the evening of the 12th, a small group on horseback broke out in an attempt to reach the British garrison at Jalalabad but only Surgeon William Brydon managed to do so, arriving late on the afternoon of the next day. This left an estimated 20 officers and 45 other ranks surrounded by the Ghilji on a hill outside the village of Gandamak; they refused an offer to surrender and were over-run. The only survivors were a few wounded privates and Captain Thomas Souter, who had wrapped the regimental colours around his waist; the attackers assumed this meant he was a high-ranking officer. Traces of weapons and equipment from the battle could be seen in the 1970s and as late as 2010, the bones of the dead still covered the hillside.

=== Crimean War ===
The 44th Foot was reconstituted and landed at Varna in summer 1854 for service in the Crimean War. It served under General Sir Richard England in the 3rd Division and saw action at the Battle of the Alma in September 1854, the Battle of Inkerman in November 1854 and the siege of Sevastopol in winter 1854. At Sevastopol it took part in the capture of the cemetery.

=== Second Opium War ===
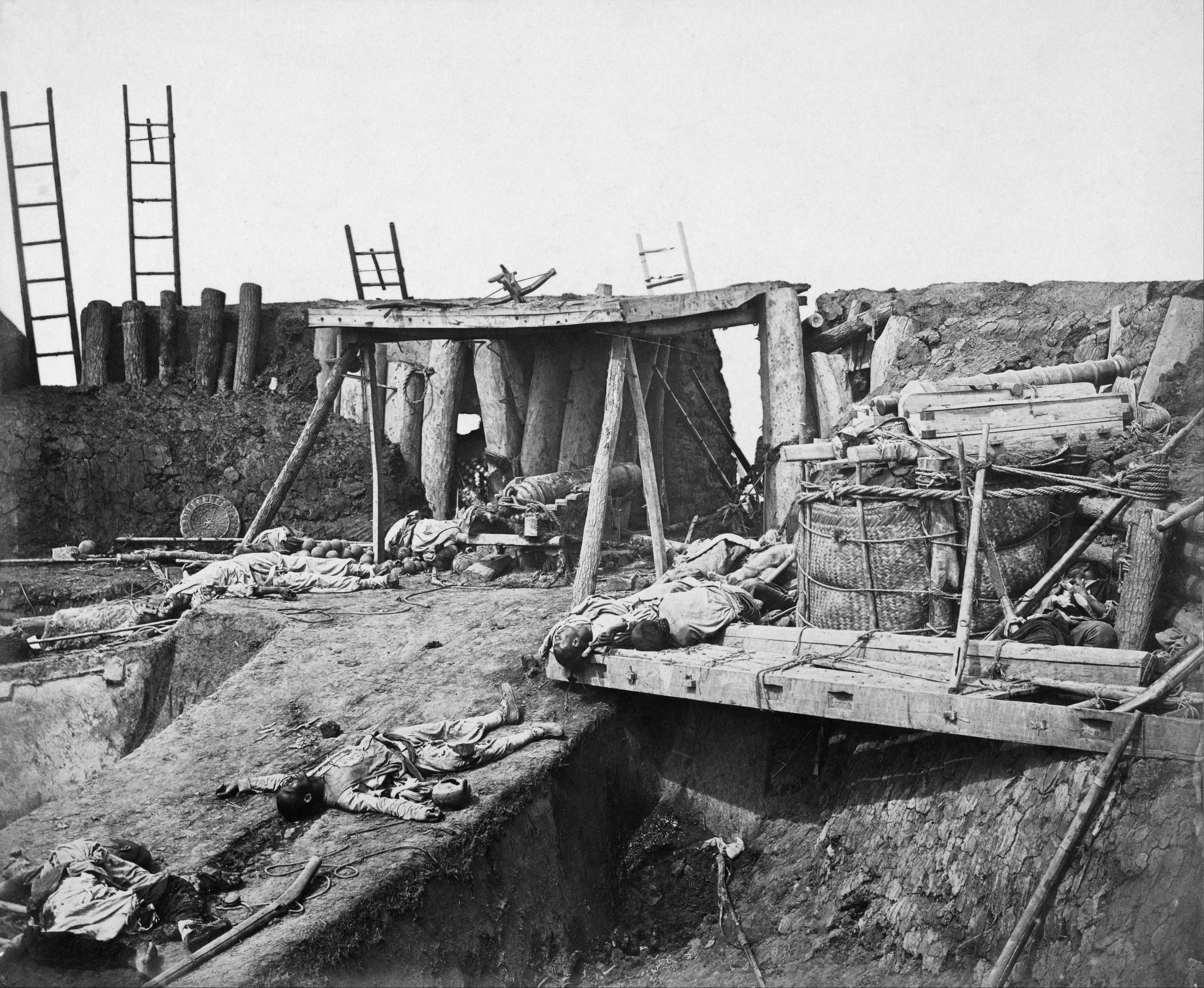
Interior of Angle of North Fort Immediately after Its Capture, 21 August 1860

The regiment embarked for China in 1860 for service in the Second Opium War. It took in the capture of the Taku Forts on 21 August 1860 as part of the Anglo-French forces under command of General Sir James Hope Grant. The regiment was in the vanguard of the assault on the North Taku entrenchments. The attacking force crossed a series of ditches and bamboo-stake palisades under heavy Chinese musketry, and tried to force entrance by the main gate. When this effort was unsuccessful, an assault party climbed the wall to an embrasure and forced entry to the fort. The first British officer to enter the fort was Lieutenant Robert Montresor Rogers who was awarded the Victoria Cross for his conspicuous bravery. He was closely followed by Private John McDougall who was also awarded the VC. The regiment left China in October 1861 and returned to India.

=== Amalgamation ===
As part of the Cardwell Reforms of the 1870s, where single-battalion regiments were linked together to share a single depot and recruiting district in the United Kingdom, the 44th was linked with the 56th (West Essex) Regiment of Foot, and assigned to district no. 44 at Warley Barracks near Brentwood. On 1 July 1881 the Childers Reforms came into effect and the regiment amalgamated with the 56th (West Essex) Regiment of Foot to form the Essex Regiment.

Following the release of the 1957 Defence White Paper which saw the British Army undergo restructuring yet again, the Essex Regiment was merged with Bedfordshire and Hertfordshire Regiment to form the 3rd East Anglian Regiment. This regiment existed for only a small number of years as the 1966 Defence White Paper was released and saw the British Army undergo even more transitions, resulting in the 1st East Anglian Regiment, 2nd East Anglian Regiment, 3rd East Anglian Regiment and The Royal Leicestershire Regiment being merged to create one larger regiment - the Royal Anglian Regiment. The Royal Anglian Regiment still exists now and is composed of three battalions - two regular and one reserve. The legacy of the 44th Regiment of Foot is upheld to this day as the 3rd East Anglian Regiment became the 3rd Battalion of the Royal Anglian Regiment.

== In fiction ==
The capture of a French Imperial Eagle by the fictional South Essex Regiment at the Battle of Talavera in Bernard Cornwell's novel Sharpe's Eagle is based upon the achievement of the 44th Regiment at the Battle of Salamanca. The primary historical difference, as admitted in Cornwell's historical postscript, is that no Eagle was captured at Talavera.

== Battle honours ==
The battle honours of the regiment were:

- Egypt
- Peninsular War: Badajoz, Salamanca, Peninsula
- War of 1812: Bladensburg
- Napoleonic Wars: Waterloo
- Anglo-Burmese War: Ava
- Crimean War: Alma, Inkerman, Sevastopol
- Second Opium War: Taku Forts

== Victoria Cross awards ==
The Victoria Cross were awarded to the following men of the regiment.

- Private John McDougall, Second Opium War (21 August 1860)
- Sergeant William McWheeney, Crimean War (20 October 1854)
- Lieutenant Robert Montresor Rogers, Second China War (21 August 1860)

== Colonels of the Regiment ==
Colonels of the regiment were:

- 1741–1743: Col. James Long
- 1743–1751: Col. John Lee

=== The 44th Regiment of Foot – (1751) ===
- 1751–1755: Col. Sir Peter Halkett, 2nd Baronet
- 1755–1756: Col. Robert Ellison
- 1756–1781: Gen. James Abercromby
- 1781–1809: Gen. Charles Rainsford

=== The 44th (East Essex) Regiment – (1782) ===
- 1809–1814: Gen. Sir Thomas Trigge, KB
- 1814–1820: Gen. John Howard, 15th Earl of Suffolk
- 1820–1843: Gen. Gore Browne
- 1843–1855: Gen. Hon. Sir Patrick Stuart, GCMG
- 1855–1858: Lt-Gen. Sir Frederick Ashworth
- 1858–1881: Gen. Sir Thomas Reed, GCB

== Sources ==
- Carter, Thomas (1864). Historical Record of the Forty-Fourth, or the East Essex Regiment of Foot. London: W. O. Mitchell.
- Cornwell, Bernard (1994). Sharpe's Eagle. London: HarperCollins Publishers. ISBN 978-0-00-780509-9.
- Sale, Florentia (1864). A Journal of the Disasters in Affghanistan, 1841-2. London: J. Murray.
