= Blackheath drill hall =

Military building in London, England

- London
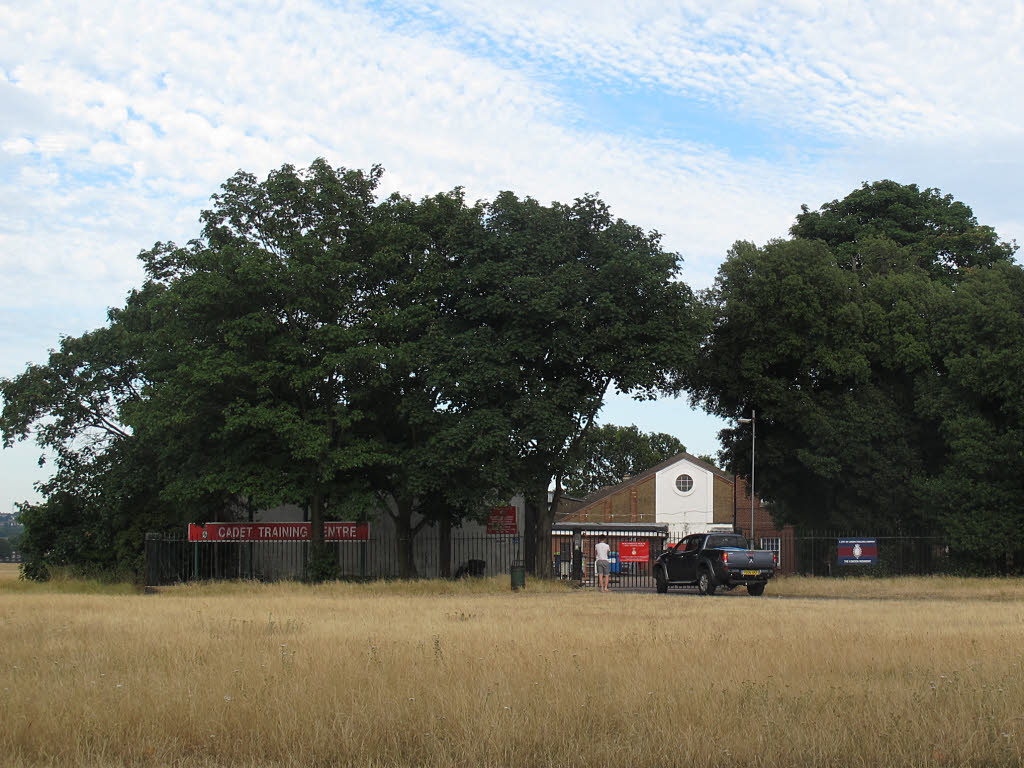
- Blackheath drill hall

Site information
- Type: Drill hall

Location
- Location within London
- Coordinates: 51.47046°N 0.00544°W

Site history
- Built: 1938
- Built for: War Office
- In use: 1938-21st Century

Blackheath drill hall is a military installation at Blackheath in London that currently houses C (London) Company of the 5th Battalion Royal Fusiliers, and is also used by the Army Cadets.

== History ==
The site was originally occupied by Holly Hedge House, a building built in the 18th century for the younger sons of the Earls of Dartmouth. The house was acquired for military use in 1887. The site became the headquarters of the 3rd Kent Volunteer Rifle Corps, a unit which became the 20th Battalion, London Regiment (Blackheath and Woolwich) in 1908. The battalion was mobilised at the drill hall in August 1914 before being deployed to the Western Front. In the mid 1930s the London Regiment was broken up and the 20th Battalion, London Regiment converted to become the 34th Searchlight Regiment Royal Artillery in 1935. A purpose built drill hall was constructed on the site for that unit in 1938.

During the Second World War the original house was badly damaged by bombing, and it was subsequently demolished in 1946. After the war the purpose-built drill hall was enlarged to accommodate better messing facilities and to incorporate the staircase from the old house. The 34th Searchlight Regiment evolved to become the 569th (The Queen's Own) Searchlight Regiment Royal Artillery after the war but, following an amalgamation, the searchlight unit left the site in 1955. The drill hall was instead occupied by a rifle company of the 10th Battalion the Parachute Regiment. The site is now a reserve centre for the C (London) Company of the 5th Battalion Royal Fusiliers, and is also used as the sector headquarters and 94 Cadet Detachment Royal Regiment of Fusiliers, Army Cadet Force.

== Sources ==
- Norton, G G (1973). The Red Devils, the story of the British Airborne Forces. London, England: Pan Books. ISBN 0-09-957400-4.
