= Theodore Lewis =

Theodore Lewis may refer to:

- Theodore B. Lewis (1843–1899), early leader in the Church of Jesus Christ of Latter-day Saints
- Theodore G. Lewis (1890–1934), American lawyer and politician from Wisconsin
- Ted Lewis (computer scientist) (Theodore Gyle Lewis, born 1941), American computer scientist and mathematician

== See also ==
- Ted Lewis (disambiguation)
