= Roderic Bowen Library and Archive =

Special collections library of University of Wales Trinity Saint David

Coordinates: 52.11266°N 4.07591°W

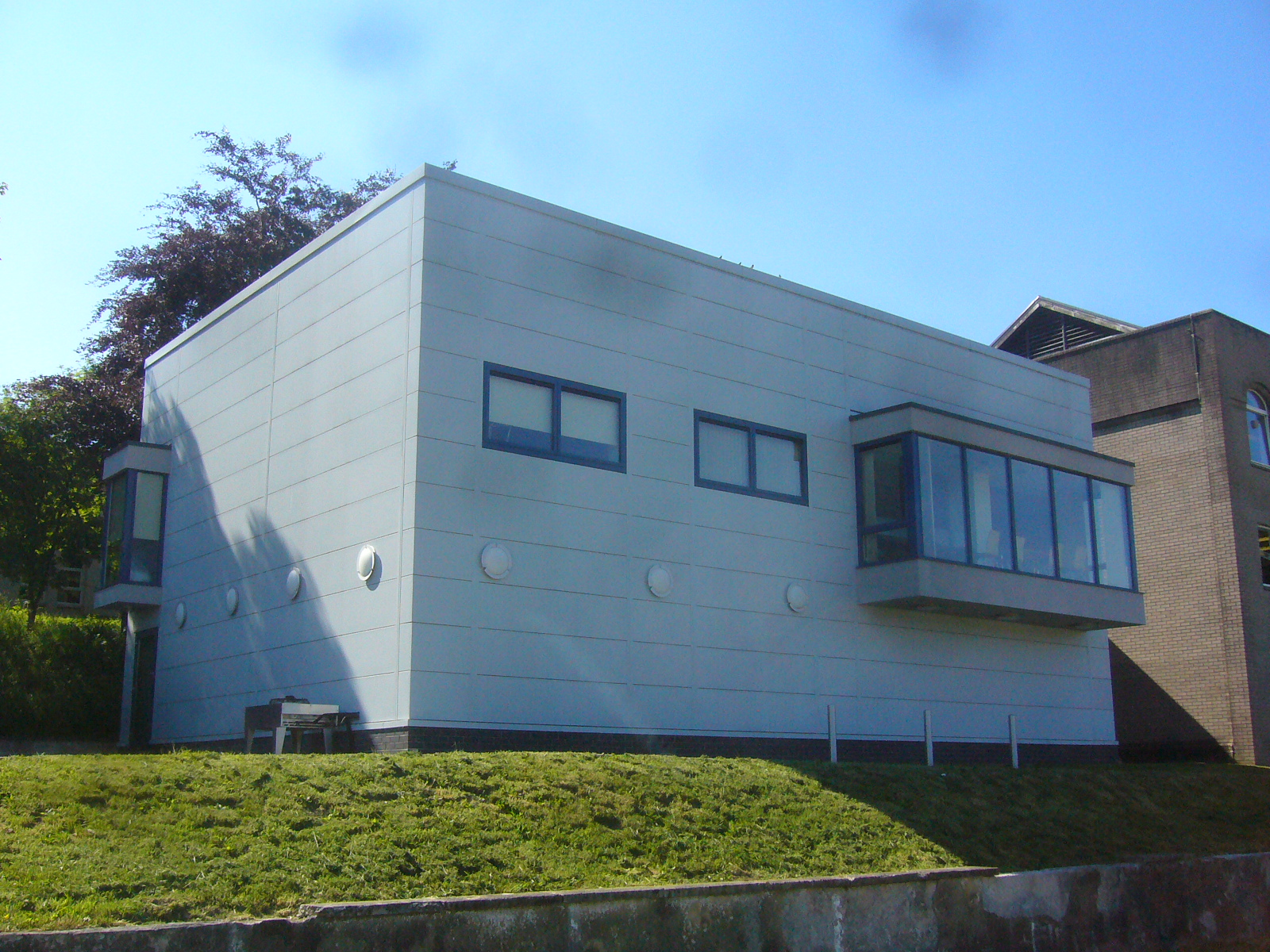
Roderic Bowen Library and Archive, UWTSD, Lampeter

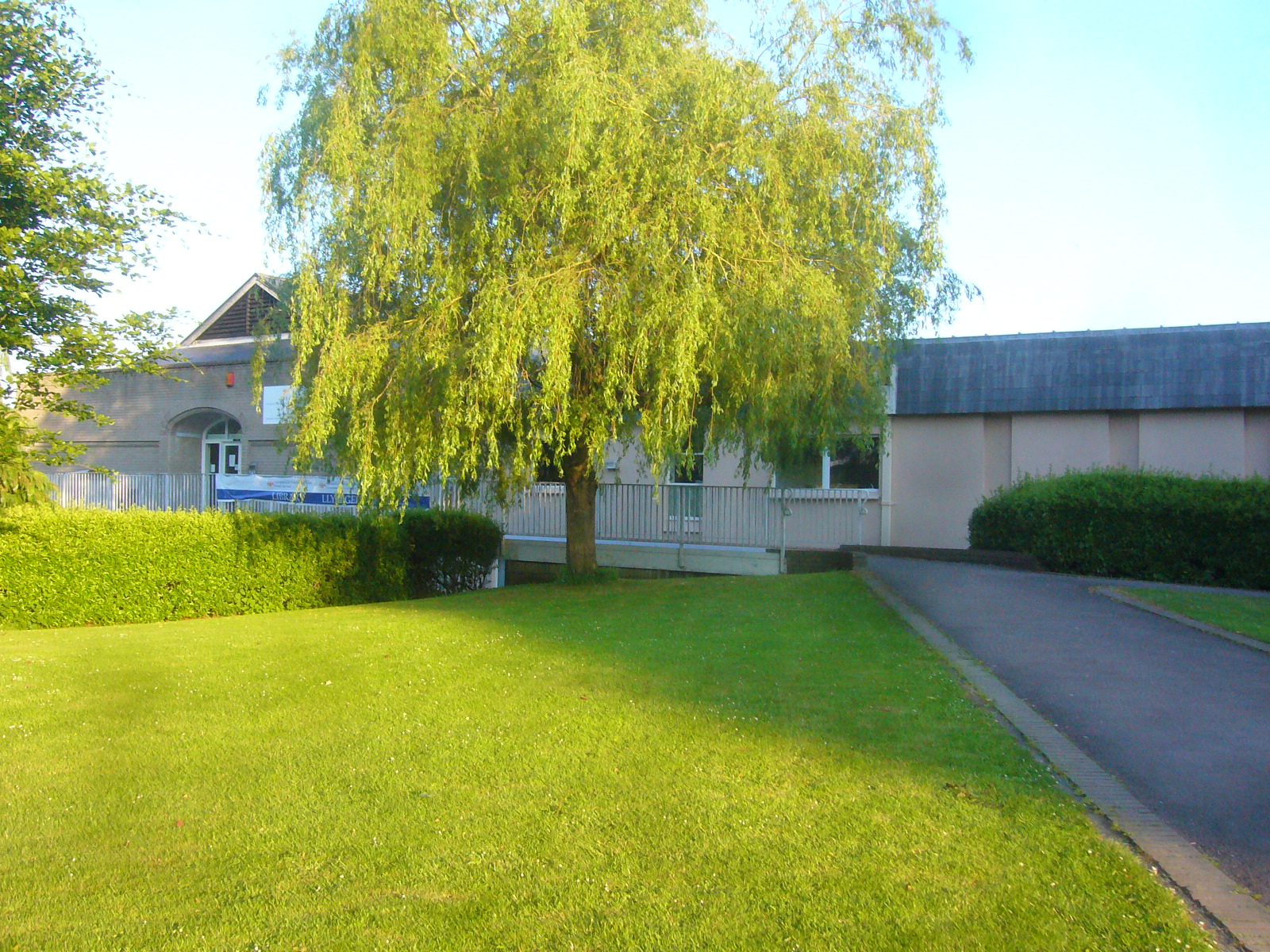
University Library, UWTSD, Lampeter

The Roderic Bowen Library and Archives (or RBLA), housing university archives and special collections, is located inside the library building of the University of Wales Trinity Saint David (UWTSD) Lampeter campus. The Lampeter campus is home to the oldest degree-granting institution in Wales, the former St David's College, and as such its Special Collections house significant information about the early history of higher education in Wales, alongside major donations from its founder the Anglican Bishop Thomas Burgess, and benefactors such as the East India Company surgeon and owner of enslaved people Thomas Phillips. The RBLA is named after Evan Roderic Bowen, Welsh Liberal Party politician, and president of the University of Wales, Lampeter, now part of UWTSD, from 1977-1992.

== Collections of the RBLA ==
The RBLA includes the archives of St David's College Lampeter and Trinity College, Carmarthen, together with a major collection of 35 000 historic volumes.

The contents of the collections were originally donated by the founders and benefactors of St David's College, Lampeter. Thomas Burgess, the founder, donated his own collection of 9000 volumes, including a 13th century Bible, and a copy of Wynkyn de Worde's Legenda aurea, printed in 1498./ Thomas Phillips donated 20,000 books, relating to a wide variety of disciplines, ranging from travel of all kinds to botany, medicine and history. Dr Thomas Bowdler gave a major collection of 9000 17th and 18th century tracts and pamphlets, collected by three previous members of his family. The treasures of the collection include two 15th century Books of Hours, a first edition of Gulliver's Travels (London, 1726) and a copy of the Abraham Ortelius atlas (1606), containing the first printed map of Wales drawn by Humphrey Llwyd (1606). The archive also houses important Celtic material, including a collection of 800 Welsh ballads, purchased by the college in 1904.

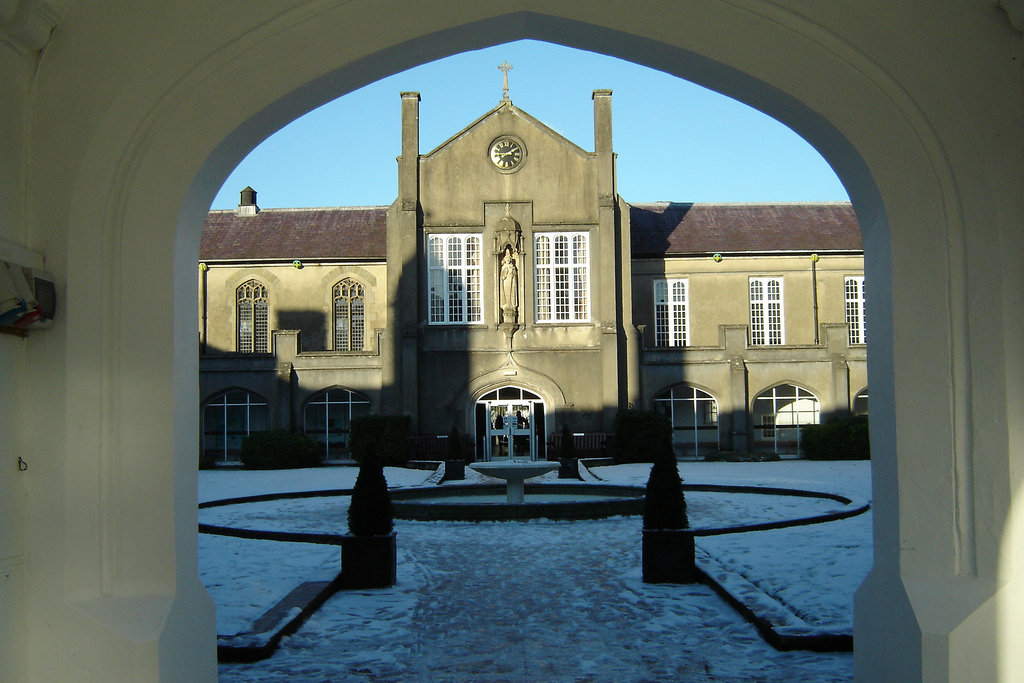
St. David's Building, UWTSD, Lampeter

Much of the contents of the current Special Collections were originally housed in the old university library, now known as the Founder's Library, in the St. David's Building. This was built between 1822 and 1827, for the then enormous sum of £21,000; from 1837, the library was extended to house the collections donated by Burgess and Phillips. The Special Collections were moved to a new purpose-built research library in 2008; it was officially opened by Rhodri Morgan, First Minister for Wales. Unlike the collection's former home, the Roderic Bowen Library and Archives is climate and humidity controlled to preserve its contents.

In 2022, to celebrate the bicentenary of the founding of St David's College, the university published Treasures: The Special Collections of the University of Wales Trinity Saint David, a series of essays on some of the most important items held in the Roderic Bowen Collection, edited by John Morgan-Guy.

== Access to the RBLA ==
The RBLA is accessible to the general public by prior appointment, with materials being provided at the user's request. Users can search for titles using the library catalogue Primo or the archive's catalogues while within the RBLA, or can pre-order materials via e-mail communication with the department. Students at UWTSD are able to access the RBLA at most times it is open and staffed; as with members of the general public, access to materials is provided on request. The Special Collections are also used for university teaching; students are able to work on projects and dissertations using special collections materials.
