= Edward Lewis =

Edward Lewis may refer to:

== Politicians ==
- Edward Lewis (Devizes MP) (1650–1674), British MP for Devizes, 1669–1674
- Edward Lewis (Radnor MP), British MP for Radnor, 1761–1768, 1769–1774 and 1775–1790
- Edward Parke Custis Lewis (1837–1892), U.S. Ambassador to Portugal
- Edward Norman Lewis (1858–1931), Canadian politician
- Edward T. Lewis (politician) (1834–1927), member of the United States House of Representatives from Louisiana
- Edward Lewis (Australian politician) (born 1936), member of the Victorian Legislative Council
- Ed Lewis (Missouri politician), member of the Missouri House of Representatives
- Edward Zammit Lewis, Maltese politician

== Sports ==
- Ed Lewis (basketball) (1910–2006), All-American center for Oregon State College in 1932–33
- Ed Lewis (wrestler) (1891–1966), American wrestler best known as Ed "The Strangler" Lewis
- Eddie Lewis (footballer, born 1935) (1935–2011), English footballer
- Eddie Lewis (American soccer) (born 1974), former American soccer player
- Eddie Lewis (footballer, born 1926) (1926–1993), English footballer
- Eddie Lewis (American football) (born 1953), former professional American football defensive back
- Edward John Lewis (1859–1925), Welsh international rugby player
- Edward M. Lewis (1872–1936), Welsh-born, American baseball pitcher, professor of English literature and academic administrator
- Edward Lewis (cricketer) (born 1959), American cricketer of Antiguan origin

== Music ==
- Ed Lewis (musician) (1909–1985), American jazz trumpeter
- Edward Lewis (Decca) (1900–1980), founder of Decca Records in 1929

== Others ==
- Edward T. Lewis (college president), college president, poet, educator
- Edward B. Lewis (1918–2004), American geneticist and Nobel Prize winner
- Edward Gardner Lewis (1869–1950), American promoter, publisher, and political activist
- Edward J. Lewis (1937–2006), American businessman and real estate developer from Pittsburgh
- Ed Lewis, British Committee of 100 signatory
- Edward Lewis (filmmaker), American news photographer and documentary filmmaker who made films about African Americans for Million Dollar Productions
- Edward Lewis (producer) (1919–2019), film producer
- Edward Lewis (publisher) (born 1940), American magazine publisher
- Edward Lewis (minister) (1831–1913), New Zealand bootmaker and Church of Christ minister
- Ed Lewis (1914–1976), "Bim" from Jamaican double-act Bim and Bam
- Edward Mann Lewis (1863–1949), U.S. Army officer
- Edward Lincoln Lewis (1865–1938), archdeacon of St Davids
- Edward Augustus Lewis (1820–1889), justice of the Supreme Court of Missouri
- Edward Lewis (Sir) (1508–1561), Welsh landowner and sheriff of Glamorgan

== See also ==
- Ted Lewis (disambiguation)
- Eddy Louiss (1941–2015), French jazz musician
