= Ted Lewis =

Ted Lewis may refer to:

- Ted Lewis (baseball) (1872–1936), Welsh-born professional baseball player in Boston, university president
- Ted Lewis (computer scientist) (born 1941), American computer scientist and mathematician, and professor at the Naval Postgraduate School
- Ted Lewis (musician) (1890–1971), American bandleader, musician, entertainer, singer
- Ted Lewis (voice actor) (born 1969), American voice actor
- Ted Lewis (writer) (1940–1982), English crime novelist
- Ted "Kid" Lewis (1893–1970), English world boxing champion

== See also ==
- Edward Lewis (disambiguation)
- Theodore Lewis (disambiguation)
- Duris Maxwell (born 1946), Canadian drummer who has used the alias Ted Lewis
