= Ben Lewis =

Ben Lewis may refer to:

- Ben Lewis (Australian actor) (1979–2025), British-born Australian musical theatre actor
- Ben Lewis (writer), British writer for theatre, radio and television; theatre director; actor and performer
- Ben Lewis (editor) (1894–1970), American film editor
- Ben Lewis (filmmaker), (born 1966) British filmmaker and art critic
- Ben Lewis (footballer) (born 1977), English footballer
- Ben Lewis (rugby union) (born 1986), Welsh rugby player
- Ben Lewis (Canadian actor) (born 1985), Canadian film and television actor
- Ben H. Lewis (1902–1985), mayor of Riverside, California, United States

== See also ==
- Benjamin Lewis (disambiguation)
