= Swansea Metropolitan University =

Former college in Swansea, Wales

- Welsh: Metropolitan Abertawe
- Coat of arms
- Former names: Swansea Metropolitan University (2008), Swansea Institute of Higher Education (1992-2008), West Glamorgan Institute of Higher Education (1976-1992), Swansea (Municipal) School of Art and Crafts (1853), Swansea Training College (1872), Swansea Technical College (1897).
- Students: 5,765
- Undergraduates: 4,520
- Postgraduates: 1,075
- Other students: 175 FE
- Location: Mount Pleasant; Swansea SA1 6ED, Swansea, Wales, UK
- Campus: Urban

Swansea Metropolitan University (Welsh: Prifysgol Fetropolitan Abertawe) is a former university based in Swansea, Wales, UK. The university merged with, and became a constituent campus of, the University of Wales Trinity Saint David on 1 August 2013.

Employing more than 500 staff and teaching over 6,000 students, the Swansea Metropolitan University grew out of the three former Swansea colleges of Art, Teacher Education, and Technology which were founded in 1853, 1872 and 1897 respectively and merged in 1976 to form a centre for the delivery of vocational higher education.

== History ==
For most of the 20th century there were – in addition to Swansea University – three separate further educational institutions serving the city of Swansea: the Swansea (Municipal) School of Art and Crafts (established in 1853); the Swansea Training College (established in 1872) and Swansea Technical College (established in 1897). Swansea Training College which had been funded by Rose Mary Crawshay was the first place in Wales where women could train as teachers.

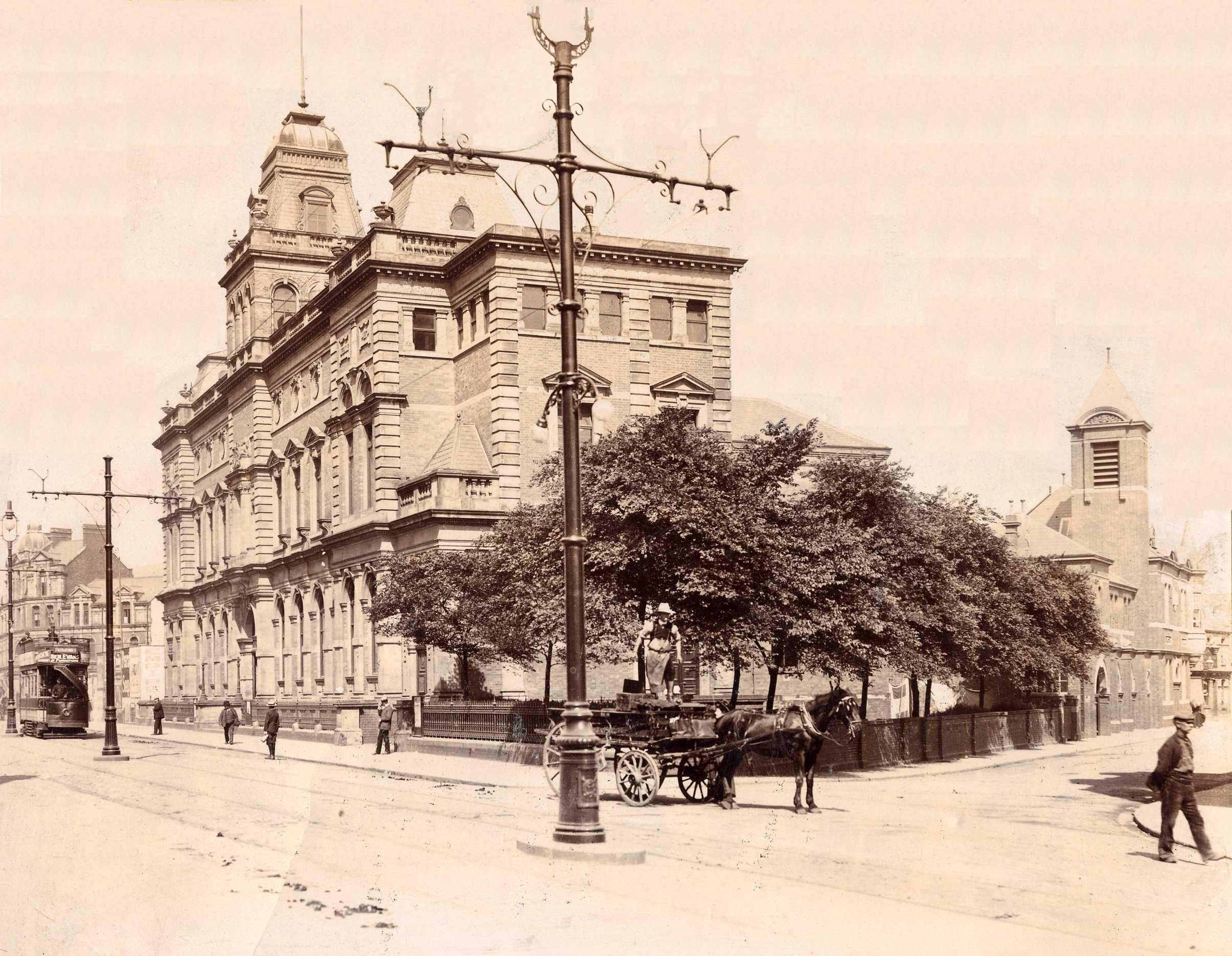
Alexandra Road campus (1890s)

During this time, the School of Art and Crafts was based on Alexandra Road, near Mount Pleasant Hill opposite Swansea Central Police Station.

The former College of Education was based in the Townhill area of the city where the Metropolitan University's teaching and humanities courses were taught before relocating to the new university development.

Swansea Technical College, based in Mount Pleasant, provided vocational qualifications and hosted many of the Metropolitan University's programmes in business, computing, engineering and construction.

In 1976 the three institutions came together to form the West Glamorgan Institute of Higher Education. In 1992 the institution was renamed Swansea Institute of Higher Education and became an independent Higher Education Corporation away from local authority control. In 2008 and following a successful two-year inspection, the Privy Council gave permission for the institution to be renamed Swansea Metropolitan University.

Despite these radical changes, the university stayed close to its roots, with the three founder institutions reflected in the four faculties that made up the university.

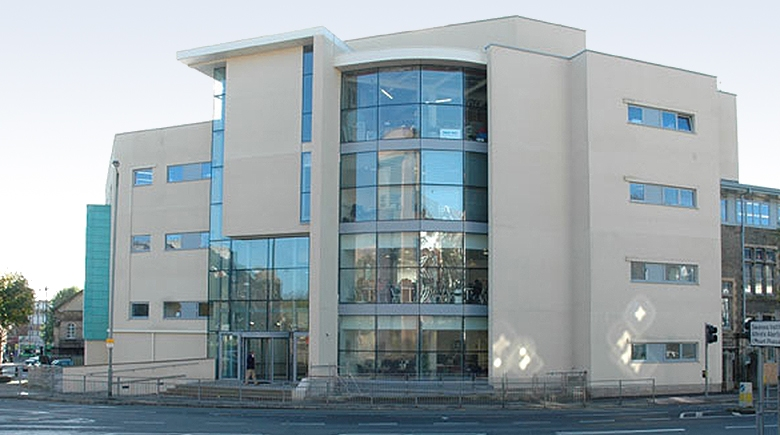
Swansea College of Art Campus (2015)

The make-up of the institution changed over half a century, moving from three separate establishments offering considerably less education programs, to a university with close to 7,000 students and was a provider of undergraduate, postgraduate and research qualifications, as well as professional programs as well as staying a vocationally driven, industry-focused university.

Despite being an institution that focused on teaching, sixty per cent of the university's research work was rated as being of 'international significance', and in some cases 'world leading' in the 2008 Research Assessment Exercise, with particular strengths in art and design, teaching and engineering.

Both Townhill and Mount Pleasant campuses subsequently closed as the university relocated to a new development based in SA1 waterfront.

== Faculties ==
Swansea Metropolitan University had four faculties:

=== Faculty of Architecture, Computing & Engineering ===
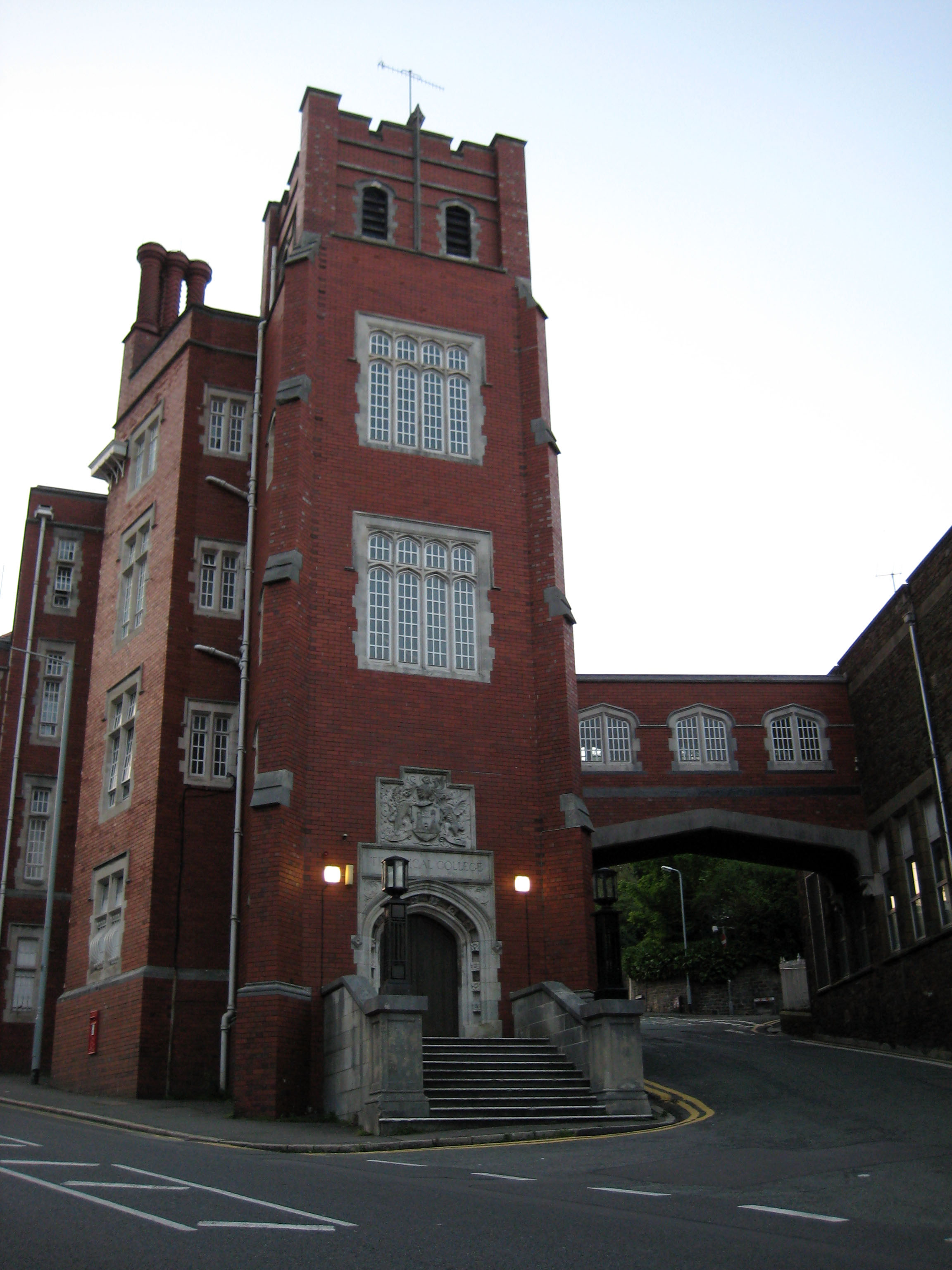
The Swansea Technical College building on Mount Pleasant

The Faculty of Applied Design and Engineering taught skills for engineering, logistics, construction, computing, industrial design, and the creative industries.

Schools:

- Engineering
- Architecture and Built Environment
- Applied Computing

=== Swansea College of Art ===
Based in the redeveloped former Dynevor Grammar School, the school is now known as Swansea College of Art a constituent campus of the University of Wales Trinity Saint David.

Schools:

- School of Visual Communication
- School of Fine Art & Photography
- School of Design & Applied Arts
- School of Film & Digital Media

=== Faculty of Humanities ===
The Faculty of Humanities was formerly based on Swansea Metropolitan University's Townhill campus. It provided teacher training with an extensive range of undergraduate and postgraduate teaching programmes. It has also expanded to include courses in performance and literature, counselling and psychology. The Facility of Humanities moved from the university Townhill Campus to SA1 Waterfront campus when the university closed Townhill Campus. The campus was to be sold to developers.

Schools:

- School of Education
- School of Social Sciences and Performing Arts

=== Faculty of Business and Management ===
This was based at University of Wales Trinity Saint David, Business campus, High Street Swansea (the site of the former Swansea College of Technology). It had a portfolio of programmes including business, leisure and tourism, public services, management and health and social care.

Schools:

- Swansea Business School
- School of Leisure, Tourism and Sport
- School of Public Service Leadership

== See also ==
- Armorial of UK universities
- List of universities in Wales
