= Benjamin Lewis =

Benjamin Lewis may refer to:

- Benjamin Lewis (canoeist) (born 1982), American canoeist
- Benjamin Lewis (footballer) (1869–?), Welsh footballer
- Benjamin Lewis (surveyor), Virginia surveyor and soldier in the American Revolutionary War
- Benjamin F. Lewis (1909–1963), American politician, alderman from Chicago, Illinois
- Benjamin Alec Lewis (1912–?), Archdeacon of St Davids
- Benjamin Lewis, co-chairman of Triumph Films

== See also ==
- Ben Lewis (disambiguation)
