= Swansea Business School =

Business school part of University of Wales Trinity Saint David

Coordinates: 51°37′36″N 3°56′25.5″W

- Type: Business School
- Established: 1897 (Swansea Technical College); 2010 (University of Wales Trinity Saint David)
- Affiliations: University of Wales Trinity Saint David
- Dean: Roger Maidment
- Students: <1000
- Location: Swansea, Wales
- Website: Swansea Business School

Swansea Business School (Welsh: Ysgol Fusnes Abertawe) is a public research institution focusing on business studies and is situated in the city of Swansea, Wales, UK. It is based near the High Street at the Swansea Business Campus of the University of Wales Trinity St David and is part of the Faculty of Business and Management. It offers numerous undergraduate courses in Human Resources, Law, Accounting, Business and Finance, Business Management, Leadership, Marketing and Skills for the Workplace.

Postgraduate can be studied full or part time and include MBA, online MBA, MSc Financial Management, MA Human Resource Management and MSc Trading in Financial Markets. In terms of professional courses, Swansea Business School is an Accredited Study Centre for the Chartered Institute of Marketing. The Diploma in Professional Marketing and the Digital Diploma in Professional Marketing are available for part-time study. As an approved university for Chartered Institute of Personnel and Development, the School offers the Postgraduate Diploma in Human Resource and the Intermediate Certificate in Human Resources.

== History ==
The latest building was a part of Swansea Metropolitan University and was formed in 1897 under the Swansea Technical College. It was based on High Street Swansea, the site of the former Swansea College of Technology, and offered a portfolio of programmes which includes business, leisure and tourism, public services, management and health and social care.

The School, and the colleges that originally formed Swansea Institute of Higher Education, have existed for more than 150 years. All postgraduate and undergraduate qualifications were then awarded by the University of Wales, including the MBA programmes that existed from 1991.

Although initially a part of Swansea Metropolitan University, Swansea Business School moved to its current campus when Swansea Metropolitan University became a part of University of Wales Trinity Saint David in 2010. The university came into existence through the merger of the two oldest higher education institutions in Wales, the University of Wales, Lampeter and Trinity University College in 2010, under Lampeter's royal charter of 1828. In 2011, it was announced that the University of Wales would also be merged into Trinity Saint David. On 1 August 2013 the university merged with Swansea Metropolitan University which included Swansea Business School.

Swansea Business School achieved an "Excellent" grading for the quality of its teaching from the Higher Education Funding Council (Wales) and has a long and successful tradition of providing business education.

The School also teaches select business courses in the Trinity Saint David's Carmarthen campus.

== Programmes ==
=== Undergraduate ===
Swansea Business School offers a range of first degrees (BA) including single honours programmes covering the main business and management disciplines, and a choice of joint honours programmes. It also offers a qualifying law degree (LLB) and business foundation degree programmes. A distinctive feature of their first degrees is the business placement year which gives students valuable workplace experience.

Courses provided by Swansea Business School include Accounting, Applied Business, Business Management, Digital Marketing, Events and Festivals Management, Law and Business and Leadership and Management Skills for the Workplace

=== Postgraduate ===
At postgraduate level, the Swansea MBA is offered through full-time, part-time and online learning, together with a wide range of taught MSc courses. These also include business and industry placements. Their research degrees programme includes the DBA, PhD/MPhil in Management and MSc in Management Research. The Centre for Executive Development provides bespoke and accredited development programmes for senior managers and businesses around the world. Other postgraduate courses provided by Swansea Business School include Financial Management and Trading and Financial Markets.

== Rankings and reputation ==
- Times and Sunday Times Good University Guide 2019

1st in the UK for student satisfaction in teaching quality in Business Studies

- WhatUni? Student Choice Awards 2019

8th in the UK for university of the year
1st in the UK for course & lecturers.

- Higher Education Funding Council for Wales (HEFCW) ratings

Teaching Quality Assessment - Excellent

- Teaching Excellence Framework (TEF)

TEF Rating: Silver

- The Guardian University Guide 2019

1st in the UK for satisfaction with feedback in Business, Management & Marketing

== Faculty ==
- Roger Maidment (Dean)
- Beth Cummings
- Chris Thomas
- Felicity Healey-Benson
- Jayne Williams
- Jayne Woodman
- Julie Hayward
- Julie Thomas
- Kathryn Penaluna
- Manjit Biant
- Richard Dunstan
- Vic Saunders
- Will Fleming
- Professor Antje Cockrill
- Professor Caroline Jawad
- Professor Gareth Hughes
- Professor Sandra Dettmer
- Professor Huw Thomas
- Professor Jianjun Bu
- Professor Margaret Inman
- Professor Libin Xiao

== Student life ==
=== Students' union ===
Students of Swansea Business School are represented by the Trinity Saint David Students' Union. The Students' Union has a building located in the Llys Glas studios on Alexandra Road which is accessible by students. The Students Union relocated from the former Campus due to the university relocating to SA1 Waterfront
