= Alan M. Davis =

American computer scientist (PhD 1975, Illinois)

Alan Mark Davis was president and CEO of Offtoa, Inc. in Westminster, Colorado. He is a retired Professor of Business Strategy and Entrepreneurship in the College of Business at the University of Colorado at Colorado Springs and in the Executive MBA program at the University of Colorado at Denver.

== Career ==
Davis earned his master's degree in Computer Science under Donald B. Gillies at the University of Illinois at Urbana-Champaign (UIUC) in 1973 and Ph.D. in Computer Science under Thomas R. Wilcox there in 1975. At UIUC, Davis was notable for creating an early malware program. It was a process on a PDP-11 that (a) checked to see if an identical copy of itself was currently running as an active process, and if not, created a copy of itself and started it running; (b) checked to see if any disk space (which all users shared) was available, and if so, created a file the size of that space; and (c) looped back to step (a). As a result, the process stole all available disk space. When users tried to save files, the operating system advised them that the disk was full and that they needed to delete some existing files. Of course, if they did delete a file, this process would immediately snatch up the available space. When users called in a system administrator (A. Ian Stocks) to fix the problem, he examined the active processes, discovered the offending process, and deleted it. Of course, before he left the room, the still existing process would create another copy of itself, and the problem would not go away. The only way to make the computer work again was to reboot.

Davis held academic positions at George Mason University and the University of Tennessee. He was a visiting faculty member at UIUC, the University of the Western Cape (South Africa), the University of Technology, Sydney (Australia), and the Technical University of Madrid (Spain). He was a Fulbright Specialist at the University of Jos (Nigeria) and Atma Jaya University, Yogyakarta (Indonesia). He held industry positions at GTE (a Director of R&D at GTE Communication Systems in Phoenix, Arizona; and Director of the Software Technology Center at GTE Laboratories in Waltham, Massachusetts), BTG (Vice President in Vienna, Virginia), Omni-Vista (President in Colorado Springs, Colorado) and Offtoa, Inc (President in Westminster, Colorado). He was Editor-in-Chief of IEEE Software from 1994 to 1998 and was an editor for the Journal of Systems and Software (1987-2010) and Communications of the ACM (1981-1991) and on the editorial board of the Requirements Engineering Journal (2005-2011). He was a Fulbright Senior Specialist from 2003 through 2007. He has been an IEEE Fellow since 1994 and an IEEE Life Fellow since 2015 .

== Books ==
Davis has written the following books. In 2006, his 201 Principles of Software Development was voted by ACM members as one of the 20 classic computer science books:

- Software Requirements: Analysis and Specification (Prentice Hall 1990), ISBN 0-13-824673-4.
- Software Requirements: Objects, Functions and States (Prentice Hall, 1993), ISBN 0-13-805763-X.
- 201 Principles of Software Development (McGraw Hill, 1995), ISBN 0-07-015840-1.
- Great Software Debates (Wiley and IEEE Computer Society Press, 2004), ISBN 0-471-67523-7.
- Just Enough Requirements Management (Dorset House, 2004), ISBN 0-932633-64-1.
- Will Your New Start Up Make Money (Scrub Oak Press, 2014), ISBN 0-996028-30-7.
- Unusual Africa: Traveling on the Edge (Scrub Oak Press, 2016), ISBN 0-996028-33-1.
- Unusual Asia: Traveling on the Edge (Scrub Oak Press, 2017), ISBN 0-996028-35-8.
- Unusual Latin America (and Antarctica): Traveling on the Edge (Scrub Oak Press, 2017), ISBN 0-996028-37-4.
