= Eddie Lewis (footballer, born 1926) =

English footballer (1926–1993)

Personal information
- Full name: Edward Lewis
- Date of birth: 21 June 1926
- Place of birth: West Bromwich, England
- Date of death: December 1993 (aged 67)
- Position: Goalkeeper

Youth career
- –1946: West Bromwich Albion

Senior career*
Years	Team	Apps	(Gls)
1946	Leyton Orient	5	(0)
- * Club domestic league appearances and goals

Edward Lewis (21 June 1926 – December 1993) was an English professional footballer who played in the Football League for Leyton Orient as a goalkeeper. He died in December 1993, at the age of 67.

== Career statistics ==
Appearances and goals by club, season and competition
Club	Season	League			FA Cup		Total	
Club	Season	Division	Apps	Goals	Apps	Goals	Apps	Goals
Leyton Orient	1946–47	Third Division South	5	0	0	0	5	0
Career total			5	0	0	0	5	0
