= Theodore B. Lewis =

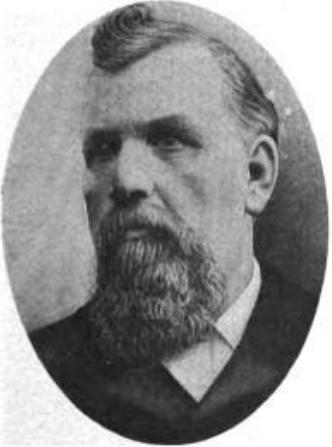

First Seven Presidents of the Seventy
- October 8, 1882 – October 9, 1882
- Called by: John Taylor
- End reason: Honorably released when it was discovered that he had already been ordained a high priest

Personal details
- Born: Theodore Belden Lewis; November 18, 1843; St. Louis, Missouri, United States
- Died: July 20, 1899 (aged 55); Boston, Massachusetts, United States

Theodore Belden Lewis (November 18, 1843 – July 20, 1899) was an early leader in the Church of Jesus Christ of Latter-day Saints (LDS Church) who was called and sustained to the Presidency of the Seventy, but never served in the office and was not set apart.

== Biography ==
Lewis was born in St. Louis, Missouri, and was orphaned at a young age. He attended Central College in Howard County and Fairview Academy.

When the American Civil War broke out, Lewis joined the Army of the West and participated in the Battle of Boonville and later engagements before his December 19, 1861 capture by Union forces. He was paroled the next spring after serving in Gratiot Street Prison and began studying law.

Lewis moved to Utah Territory to teach in 1865 and converted to the LDS Church the next year. He served a mission to the Southern States, then in 1870 began teaching at a school that later became Brigham Young Academy.

From 1872 until 1876, Lewis served as superintendent of schools in Nephi, Utah. He was also a justice of the peace there. He then went to Salt Lake City where he was the teacher at the 20th Ward School. In 1879, Lewis became superintendent of schools for Salt Lake County. From 1885 to 1887 he was principal of Ogden High School. Lewis also served as Superintendent of Utah Territorial Schools from 1894 until statehood was achieved at the start of 1896.

In the October 1882 General Conference of the church, following the custom of the day, Lewis was issued a surprise calling to become a Seventy and serve as one of the quorum's seven presidents. The congregation sustained him. However, as he was about to be set apart the next day, he reported he had already been ordained a high priest and was therefore not set apart, and never served in the quorum presidency.

A polygamist, Lewis was married to sisters Martha J. Coray and Ephrina Sarepa Coray. He was the father of 17 children.

Lewis died in Boston, Massachusetts, from complications following surgery.
