= Ted Lewis (computer scientist) =

American computer scientist

Theodore Gyle (Ted) Lewis (born 1941) is an American computer scientist and mathematician, and professor at the Naval Postgraduate School.

== Biography ==
Lewis received his BS in Mathematics and his PhD in computer Science. He started his career at the Oregon State University, where he became Professor of Computer Science and directed its Industry Research Center OACIS.

In 1993 he moved to the Naval Postgraduate School, where he was chairman of computer science for four years. In 1997 he moved to DaimlerChrysler Research and Technology, North America, Inc., where he served as president and CEO. After about three years he moved to the Eastman Kodak Company, where he directed the Digital Business Development division. In his retirement from industry in 2002, he became professor at the Naval Postgraduate School.

A columnist for IEEE Internet Computing, he has contributed pieces to Scientific American and Upside. He has served two stints of Editor-in-Chief, at IEEE Software from 1987 to 1990 and at Computer from 1993 to 1994.

== Selected publications ==
Lewis has written or co-authored 30 books, including:

- El-Rewini, Hesham, Theodore G. Lewis, and Hesham H. Ali. Task scheduling in parallel and distributed systems. Prentice-Hall, Inc., 1994.
- Lewis, Theodore Gyle. The friction-free economy: Marketing strategies for a wired world. HarperBusiness, 1997.
- El-Rewini, Hesham, and Ted G. Lewis. Distributed and parallel computing. Manning Publications Co., 1998.
- Lewis, Ted G. Microsoft Rising: And Other Tales of the Silicon Valley. IEEE Computer Society Press, 1999.

Articles, a selection

- Lewis, Theodore G., and William H. Payne. "Generalized feedback shift register pseudorandom number algorithm." Journal of the ACM 20.3 (1973): 456–468.
- El-Rewini, Hesham, and Ted G. Lewis. "Scheduling parallel program tasks onto arbitrary target machines." Journal of parallel and Distributed Computing 9.2 (1990): 138–153.
