= Thomas Phillips (educational benefactor) =

Thomas Phillips (6 July 1760 – 30 June 1851), was an educational philanthropist, a slave owner, a major donor to St David's College, Lampeter, and the founder of Llandovery College in Wales.

Phillips was born in London, within the sound of Bow Bells, to parents from Llandegley, Radnorshire. He completed part of his education in Wales and later credited his long life to his hill-climbing youth. He became apprenticed to an apothecary at Hay-on-Wye, possibly Mr Powell, before becoming a pupil of the celebrated London surgeon John Hunter of Jermyn Street. He qualified as a surgeon in 1780 and then joined the Royal Navy serving for two years. He travelled as surgeon's mate on the frigate Danae, before visiting military outposts on the Saint Lawrence, including Montreal and Quebec as surgeon on the Hind. After leaving the navy, he qualified as a member of the Company of Surgeons and joined the East India Company. He spent much of his career in India, carrying on business as well as working as a surgeon. In 1796, he became inspector of hospitals in Botany Bay, Australia. From there, he went on to China, Penang, Chennai and Kolkata. In 1798, he sailed home on sick leave; his ship was captured by a French privateer resulting in his temporary detention in Bordeaux.

In 1800, he married Althea Edwards, daughter of the rector of Cusop, Herefordshire; they had no children together. Returning to India, he became Superintending Surgeon and a member of the Bengal Medical Board. He travelled to Nepal with the campaign against the Gurkhas under Major-General Robert "Rollicking Rollo" Gillespie. He and his assistant cared for the injured as they fell, evidently using a type of mobile field-hospital and dressing-station. Phillips also started to set up some small libraries in mess rooms in order to further the education of soldiers serving in India. He bought a sugar plantation on the island of St Vincent for £40 000, and, he returned to London, a rich man, in 1817. Following the abolition of slavery, he was awarded £4737 8s 6d in compensation for the loss of 167 enslaved people.

== Philanthropy ==
Phillips retired, a rich man, to 5 Brunswick Square, London. He "spent the rest of his days in acts of charity, kindness and hospitality," wanting to give away as much as possible so he could see it well used. His main interest was in buying many thousands of books and donating them to a variety of reading rooms and scientific institutes. Phillips was a major benefactor of St David’s College, Lampeter, giving over 22,500 books to the library (known as the Thomas Phillips Collection) and establishing six scholarships of £24 a year for boys from Breconshire and Radnorshire. Prices were depressed at the time and Phillips was able to purchase incunables and other rarities at a low cost. His gifts included six medieval manuscripts and about fifty incunables. A huge range of subjects was covered, including travel and topography, natural history, literature, philosophy and theology. The books were sent to Lampeter in sixty batches between March 1834 and February 1852, probably shipped via Carmarthen and then by road.

== Llandovery College ==
He also founded Llandovery College in 1847, after the college authorities had refused his offer to endow a Welsh professorship at Lampeter. Llandovery College was founded under the name of the Welsh Educational Institution, with a donation of £4,666 and a library of 7,000 books given by Phillips. It is not certain whether he spoke the Welsh language himself, but he had a major concern for its survival. He specified that it be taught regularly and systematically at the college, and also "for some portion of the day" to be the sole medium of communication and instruction. The foundation stone was laid on 13 December 1849.

Phillips attended meetings of the London College of Surgeons almost to the end of his life. Phillips died in 1851; he was buried in the crypt of St Pancras church, London, next to his wife. At his death, 50 000 books were found in his home, all designated for distribution to various libraries.
