= List of First World War Victoria Cross recipients =

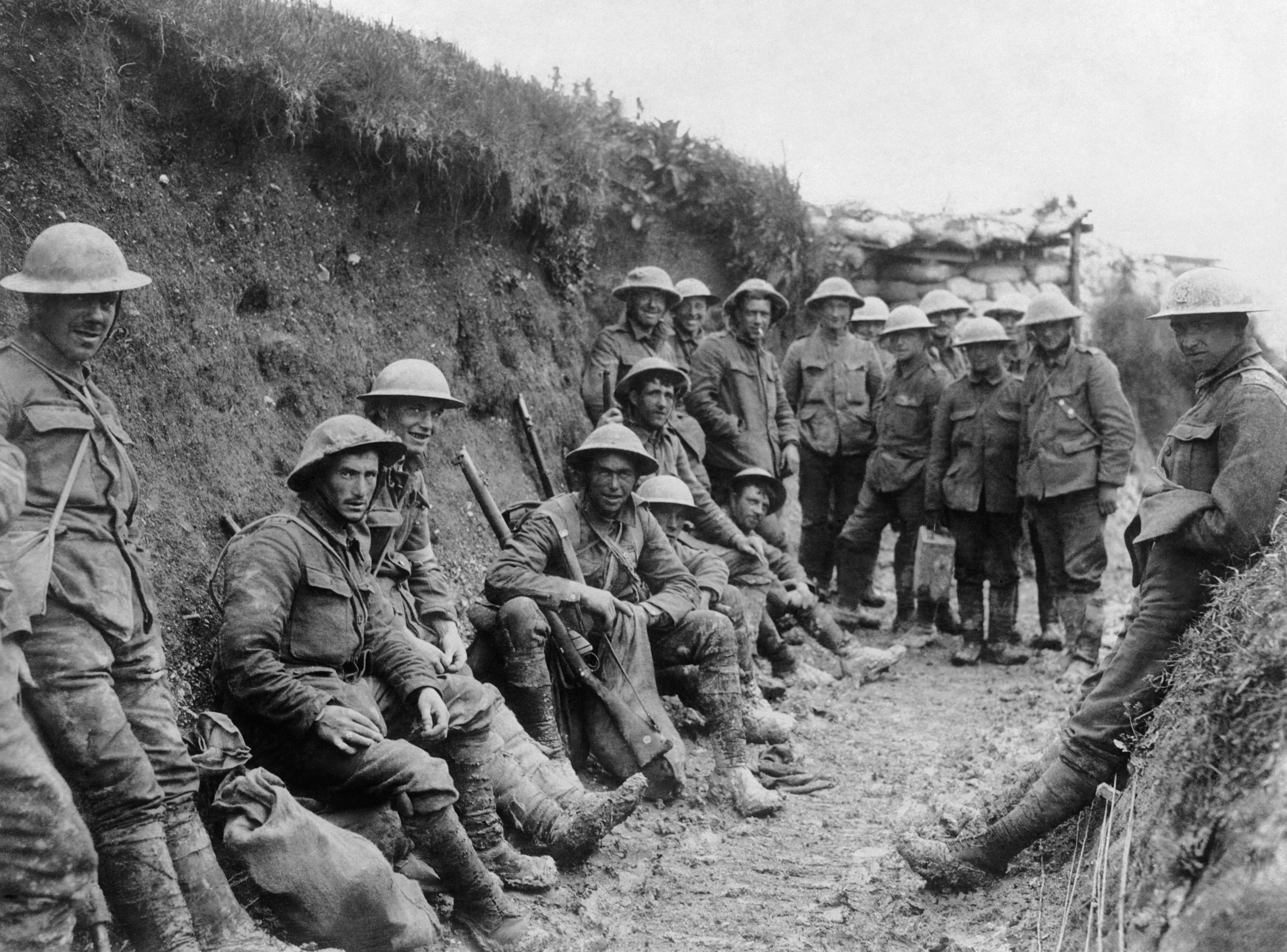
The Royal Irish Rifles in a communications trench on the first day on the Somme, 1 July 1916

The Victoria Cross (VC) was awarded 628 times to 627 recipients for action in the First World War (1914–1918). The Victoria Cross is a military decoration awarded for valor "in the face of the enemy" to members of armed forces of some Commonwealth countries and previous British Empire territories. It takes precedence over all other Orders, decorations and medals; it may be awarded to a person of any rank in any service and to civilians under military command. The award was officially constituted when Queen Victoria issued a warrant under the Royal sign-manual on 29 January 1856 that was gazetted on 5 February 1856. The order was backdated to 1854 to recognize acts of valor during the Crimean War. The first awards ceremony was held on 26 June 1857, where Queen Victoria invested 62 of the 111 Crimean recipients in a ceremony in Hyde Park.

The First World War, also known as the Great War and in the United States as World War I, was a global military conflict that embroiled most of the world's great powers, assembled in two opposing alliances: the Triple Entente and the Triple Alliance. More than 70 million military personnel were mobilized in one of the largest wars in history. The main combatants descended into a state of total war, directing their entire scientific and industrial capabilities into the war effort. Over 15 million people were killed, making it one of the deadliest conflicts in history. The proximate cause of war was the assassination on 28 June 1914 of Archduke Franz Ferdinand of Austria. Soon after, a system of alliances were activated that would see Europe at war. The Western Front saw the largest concentration of Commonwealth troops with soldiers occupying sectors of the line from the North Sea to the Orne River.

On 1 July 1916, the first day of the Battle of the Somme, the British Army endured the bloodiest day in its history, suffering 57,470 casualties and 19,240 dead; nine Victoria Crosses were awarded for action on that day. Most of the casualties occurred in the first hour of the attack. The entire Somme offensive cost the British Army almost half a million men. The war was not just fought on land; the First World War saw major naval battles as well as the first large-scale use of military aircraft. The war at sea was mainly characterized by the efforts of the Allied Powers in blockading the Central Powers by sea. In return, the Central Powers attempted to break that blockade and establish an effective blockade of the British Isles and France with U-boats and raiders. The largest naval battle of the First World War was the Battle of Jutland which was the only full-scale clash of battleships in that war. Four Victoria Crosses were awarded for action at Jutland. The war in the air saw 19 VCs being awarded to airmen. The First World War saw significant interest in flying aces, including the German Manfred von Richthofen—also known as The Red Baron—as well as British aces such as Albert Ball, Mick Mannock and Billy Bishop, who were all Victoria Cross recipients. Hostilities ended on 11 November 1918 with the signing of the Armistice Treaty in the Compiègne Forest, but the war was not officially over until the various peace treaties were signed in 1919. By the war's end, four major imperial powers – Germany, Russia, Austria-Hungary, and the Ottoman Empire—had been militarily and politically defeated, and the latter two ceased to exist as autonomous entities. Of the 60 million European soldiers who were mobilized from 1914 to 1918, 8 million were killed, 7 million were permanently disabled, and 15 million were seriously injured.

During the war, Britain called on its dominions and colonies, which provided invaluable military, financial and material support. The armies of the Dominions provided over 2.5 million men as well as many thousands of volunteers from the Crown colonies. The largest number of men came from the Indian sub continent, Canada, Australia and New Zealand. The Indian Contingent consisted of over 130,000 men in various capabilities and served primarily in France and Belgium. Over 9000 of them died and 11 of them were awarded the VC. The Australian Imperial Force (AIF) began forming on 15 August 1914 and remained a volunteer force for the entire war. Throughout the four years of conflict, 331,814 volunteers from Australia were sent overseas with 63 VCs awarded; nine of these were given for the Gallipoli Campaign. Eleven members of the New Zealand Expeditionary Force (NZEF) were awarded the Victoria Cross. The Canadian Expeditionary Force (CEF) saw over 600,000 enlistments throughout its four-year history with 71 VCs awarded. At the outbreak of the hostilities, Newfoundland was a separate dominion and 2 soldiers from Newfoundland were awarded the Victoria Cross.

The 628 awards of the Victoria Cross given for action during the First World War account for almost half the 1356 Victoria Crosses awarded throughout its history; in comparison the Second World War saw 181 medals awarded. Noel Godfrey Chavasse was awarded the Victoria Cross and Bar, for two separate actions in the First World War on the battlefields of Mametz and Passchendaele. He died from wounds received in the second action. Arthur Martin-Leake received a Bar to his Victoria Cross for action in the First World War; he had been awarded his first Victoria Cross for action in the Second Boer War.

Of the 627 recipients 159 (25.36%) were awarded posthumously.

== Recipients ==
- This along with a *, indicates a posthumous award

Name	Unit	Date of action	Place of action
Harold Ackroyd	Royal Army Medical Corps	31 July 1917 to 1 August 1917	Ypres, Belgium
Abraham Acton	Border Regiment	21 December 1914	Rouges Bancs, France
William Addison	Royal Army Chaplains' Department	9 April 1916	Sanaiyal, Mesopotamia
Tom Adlam	Bedfordshire Regiment	27 September 1916; 28 September 1916	Thiepval, France
Ernest Alexander	Royal Field Artillery	24 August 1914	Elouges, Belgium
Wallace Algie	1st Battalion, CEF	11 October 1918*	Cambrai, France
William Allen	Royal Army Medical Corps	3 September 1916	Mesnil, France
William Amey	Royal Warwickshire Regiment	4 November 1918	Landrecies, France
William Anderson	Green Howards	12 March 1915*	Neuve Chapelle, France
William Herbert Anderson	Highland Light Infantry	25 March 1918*	Maricourt, France
Leslie Andrew	Wellington Infantry Regiment	31 July 1917	La Basse Ville, Belgium
William Angus	Highland Light Infantry	12 June 1915	Givenchy, France
Adam Archibald	Corps of Royal Engineers	4 November 1918	Ors, France
Harold Auten	Royal Naval Reserve	30 July 1918	English Channel, England
Thomas Axford	16th Battalion, AIF	4 July 1918	Hamel Wood, France
Albert Ball	No. 56 Squadron RFC	25 April 1917 to 6 May 1917*	Over France
Edward Bamford	Royal Marine Light Infantry	22–23 April 1918	Zeebrugge, Belgium
Edward Barber	Grenadier Guards	12 March 1915*	Neuve Chapelle, France
William Barker	No. 1 Squadron RFC	27 October 1918	Forêt de Mormal, France
Thomas Barratt	South Staffordshire Regiment	27 July 1917*	Ypres, Belgium
John Barrett	Leicestershire Regiment	24 September 1918	Pontruet, France
Colin Barron	3rd Battalion, CEF	6 November 1917	Passchendaele, Belgium
Frederick Barter	Royal Welsh Fusiliers	16 May 1915	Festubert, France
Cyril Bassett	New Zealand Divisional Signal Company	7 August 1915	Gallipoli, Turkey
Arthur Batten-Pooll	Royal Munster Fusiliers	25 June 1916	Colonne, France
Edward Baxter	King's (Liverpool Regiment)	18 April 1916*	Blairville, France
Daniel Beak	Royal Naval Volunteer Reserve	21 August 1918 to 8 September 1918^{[A]}	Logeast Wood, France
Ernest Beal	Green Howards	21–22 March 1918*	Saint-Léger, France
Robert Beatham	8th Battalion, AIF	9 August 1918*	Rosières-en-Santerre
Andrew Beauchamp-Proctor	No. 84 Squadron RFC	8 August 1918 to 8 October 1918	France
William Beesley	Prince Consort's Own (Rifle Brigade)	8 May 1918	Bucquoy, France
Douglas Belcher	London Regiment	13 May 1915	Wieltje–Saint-Julien Road, Belgium
Donald Bell	Green Howards	5 July 1916	Somme, France
Eric Bell	Royal Inniskilling Fusiliers	1 July 1916*	Thiepval, France
Richard Bell-Davies	No. 3 Squadron RNAS	19 November 1915	Ferrijik Junction, Bulgaria
Edward Bellew	7th Battalion, CEF	24 April 1915	Kerselare, Belgium
Eugene Bennett	Worcestershire Regiment	5 November 1916	Le Transloy, France
Philip Bent	Leicestershire Regiment	1 October 1917*	Polygon Wood, Belgium
Spencer Bent	East Lancashire Regiment	1 November 1914	Le Gheer, Belgium
Bertram Best-Dunkley	Lancashire Fusiliers	31 July 1917*	Wieltje, Belgium
Edward Bingham	HMS Nestor	31 May 1916	Battle of Jutland, Denmark
Frederick Birks	6th Battalion, AIF	21 September 1917	Ypres, Belgium
Billy Bishop	No. 60 Squadron RAF	2 June 1917	Cambrai, France
William Bissett	Princess Louises's (Argyll and Sutherland Highlanders)	25 October 1918	Maing, France
Arthur Blackburn	10th Battalion, AIF	23 July 1916	Pozières, France
William Bloomfield	2nd South African Mounted Brigade	24 August 1916	Mlali, Tanganyika
Charles Bonner	HMS Dunraven	8 August 1917	Bay of Biscay, Atlantic Ocean
Frederick Booth	British South Africa Police	12 February 1917	Johannesbruck, Tanganyika
Albert Borella	26th Battalion, AIF	17 July 1918	Villers-Bretonneux, France
Arthur Borton	London Regiment	7 November 1917	Sheria, Palestine
Stanley Boughey	Royal Scots Fusiliers	1 December 1917*	El Burf, Palestine
William Boulter	Northamptonshire Regiment	14 July 1916	Trones Wood, France
Rowland Bourke	Royal Naval Volunteer Reserve	9–10 May 1918	Ostend, Belgium
George Boyd-Rochfort	Scots Guards	3 August 1915	Cambrin, France
Edward Boyle	HMS E14	27 April 1915	Dardanelles, Turkey
Edward Bradbury	Royal Horse Artillery	1 September 1914*	Néry, France
George Bradford	HMS Iris II	22–23 April 1918*	Zeebrugge, Belgium
Roland Bradford	Durham Light Infantry	1 October 1916	Eaucourt L'Abbaye, France
Alexander Brereton	8th Battalion, CEF	9 August 1918	Amiens, France
Jean Brillant	22nd Battalion, CEF	8–9 August 1918*	Meharicourt, France
Walter Brodie	Highland Light Infantry	11 November 1914	Becelaere, Belgium
Cuthbert Bromley	Lancashire Fusiliers	25 April 1915	Gallipoli, Turkey
James Brooke	Gordon Highlanders	29 October 1914*	Gheluvelt, Belgium
Edward Brooks	Oxfordshire and Buckinghamshire Light Infantry	28 April 1917	Fayet, France
Oliver Brooks	Coldstream Guards	8 October 1915	Loos, France
Donald Brown	Otago Infantry Regiment	15 September 1916	High Wood, France
Harry Brown	10th Battalion, CEF	16 August 1917*	Hill 70, France
Walter Brown	20th Battalion, AIF	6 July 1918	Villers-Bretonneux, France
William Bruce	59th Scinde Rifles	19 December 1914*	Givenchy, France
Thomas Bryan	Northumberland Fusiliers	9 April 1917	Arras, France
John Buchan	Princess Louises's (Argyll and Sutherland Highlanders)	21 March 1918*	Marteville, France
Angus Buchanan	South Wales Borderers	5 April 1916	Falauyah Lines, Mesopotamia
William Buckingham	Leicestershire Regiment	10 March 1915; 12 March 1915	Neuve Chapelle, France
Alexander Buckley	54th Battalion, AIF	1–2 September 1918*	Péronne, France
Maurice Buckley	13th Battalion, AIF	18 September 1918	Le Verguier, France
Patrick Bugden	31st Battalion, AIF	26–28 September 1917*	Zonnebeke, Belgium
Daniel Burges	South Wales Borderers	18 September 1918	Jumeaux, Macedonia
William Burman	Prince Consort's Own (Rifle Brigade)	20 September 1917	Ypres, Belgium
Alfred Burt	Hertfordshire Regiment	27 September 1915	Cuinchy, France
Alexander Burton	7th Battalion, AIF	9 August 1915*	Gallipoli, Turkey
Christopher Bushell	Queen's (Royal West Surrey) Regiment	23 March 1918	Tergnier, France
John Butler	King's Royal Rifle Corps	17 November 1914	Cameroons, Nigeria
William Butler	Prince of Wales's Own (West Yorkshire Regiment)	6 August 1917	Lempire, France
Robert Bye	Welsh Guards	31 July 1917	Yser Canal, Belgium
John Caffrey	York and Lancaster Regiment	16 November 1915	La Brique, France
Hugh Cairns	46th Battalion, CEF	1 November 1918*	Valenciennes, France
Thomas Caldwell	Royal Scots Fusiliers	31 October 1918	Audenarde, Belgium
Laurence Calvert	King's Own (Yorkshire Light Infantry)	12 September 1918	Havrincourt, France
Frederick Campbell	1st Battalion, CEF	15 June 1915*	Givenchy, France
Gordon Campbell	HMS Farnborough	17 February 1917	Atlantic Ocean
John Campbell	Coldstream Guards	15 September 1916	Ginchy, France
John Carless	HMS Caledon	17 November 1917*	Battle of Heligoland, Germany
John Carmichael	Prince of Wales's (North Staffordshire Regiment)	8 September 1917	Zwarteleen, Belgium
Alfred Carpenter	HMS Vindictive	22–23 April 1918	Zeebrugge, Belgium
John Carroll	33rd Battalion, AIF	7–12 June 1917	St. Yves, Belgium
Nelson Carter	Royal Sussex Regiment	30 June 1916*	Richebourg l'Avoue, France
Adrian Carton de Wiart	4th Royal Irish Dragoon Guards	2–3 July 1916	La Boiselle, France
George Cartwright	33rd Battalion, AIF	31 August 1918	Bouchavesnes, France
Bernard Cassidy	Lancashire Fusiliers	28 March 1918*	Arras, France
Claude Castleton	Australian Machine Gun Corps	28–29 July 1916*	Pozières, France
George Cates	Prince Consort's Own (Rifle Brigade)	8 March 1917*	Bouchavesnes, France
Geoffrey Cather	Royal Irish Fusiliers (Princess Victoria's)	1 July 1916*	Hamel, France
Harry Cator	East Surrey Regiment	9 April 1917	Arras, France
George Chafer	East Yorkshire Regiment	3–4 June 1916	Meaulte, France
Chatta Singh	9th Bhopal Infantry	13 January 1916	Battle of the Wadi, Mesopotamia
Noel Chavasse	Royal Army Medical Corps	9 August 1916; 31–2 August 1917^{[B]}	Guillemont, France; Wieltje, Belgium
Percy Cherry	26th Battalion, AIF	26 March 1917*	Lagnicourt, France
Harry Christian	King's Own (Royal Lancaster Regiment)	18 October 1915	Cuinchy, France
John Christie	London Regiment	21–22 December 1917	Fejja, Palestine
William Clamp	Green Howards	9 October 1917*	Poelcapelle, Belgium
George Clare	5th Royal Irish Lancers	28–29 November 1917*	Bourlon Wood, France
James Clarke	Lancashire Fusiliers	2 November 1918	Happegarbes, France
Leo Clarke	2nd Battalion, CEF	9 September 1916	Pozières, France
William Clark-Kennedy	24th Battalion, CEF	27–28 August 1918	Fresnes, France
Brett Cloutman	Corps of Royal Engineers	6 November 1918	Pont-sur-Sambre, France
Clifford Coffin	Corps of Royal Engineers	31 July 1917	Westhoek, Belgium
Harold Colley	Lancashire Fusiliers	25 August 1918*	Martinpuich, France
Joseph Collin	King's Own (Royal Lancaster Regiment)	9 April 1918*	Givenchy, France
John Collings-Wells	Bedfordshire Regiment	22–27 March 1918*	Marcoing, France
John Collins	Royal Welsh Fusiliers	31 October 1917	Beersheba, Palestine
William Coltman	Prince of Wales's (North Staffordshire Regiment)	3–4 October 1918	Mannequin Hill, France
Herbert Columbine	Machine Gun Corps	22 March 1918*	Hervilly Wood, France
Hugh Colvin	Cheshire Regiment	20 September 1917	Ypres, Belgium
Thomas Colyer-Fergusson	Northamptonshire Regiment	31 July 1917*	Bellewaarde, Belgium
Robert Combe	27th Battalion, CEF	3 May 1917*	Acheville, France
Billy Congreve	Prince Consort's Own (Rifle Brigade)	6–20 July 1916	Longueval, France
Thomas Cooke	8th Battalion, AIF	24–25 July 1916*	Pozières, France
Edgar Cookson	Comet (1910)	28 September 1915*	Kut-el-Amara, Mesopotamia
Edward Cooper	King's Royal Rifle Corps	16 August 1917	Langemark, Belgium
Frederick Coppins	8th Battalion, CEF	9 August 1918	Hackett Woods, France
Jack Cornwell	HMS Chester	31 May 1916*^{[C]}	Battle of Jutland, Denmark
William Cosgrove	Royal Munster Fusiliers	26 April 1915	Gallipoli, Turkey
William Cotter	Buffs (East Kent Regiment)	6 March 1916*^{[C]}	Hohenzollern Redoubt, France
Jack Counter	King's (Liverpool Regiment)	16 April 1918	Boisieux St. Marc, France
Gabriel Coury	Prince of Wales's Volunteers (South Lancashire Regiment)	8 August 1916	Arrow Head Copse, France
Charles Coverdale	Manchester Regiment	4 October 1917	Poelcapelle, Belgium
Charles Cowley	Royal Naval Volunteer Reserve	24–25 April 1916*	Kut-el-Amara, Mesopotamia
Christopher Cox	Bedfordshire Regiment	13 March 1917	Achiet-le-Grand, France
John Craig	Royal Scots Fusiliers	5 June 1917	Egypt
James Crichton	Auckland Infantry Regiment	30 September 1918	Crèvecœur-le-Grand, France
Thomas Crisp	Royal Naval Reserve	15 August 1917*	North Sea
John Croak	13th Battalion, CEF	8 August 1918*	Amiens, France
Arthur Cross	Machine Gun Corps	25 March 1918	Ervillers, France
John Crowe	Worcestershire Regiment	14 April 1918	Neuve Eglise, Belgium
Robert Cruickshank	London Scottish Regiment	1 May 1918	Jordan, Palestine
Victor Crutchley	HMS Vindictive	9 May 1918	Ostend, Belgium
John Cunningham	East Yorkshire Regiment	13 November 1916	Hebuterne Sector, France
John Cunningham	Prince of Wales's Leinster Regiment	12 April 1917*^{[C]}	Bois-en-Hache, France
William Currey	53rd Battalion, AIF	1 September 1918	Péronne, France
Horace Curtis	Royal Dublin Fusiliers	18 October 1918	Le Cateau, France
Henry Dalziel	15th Battalion, AIF	4 July 1918	Hamel Wood, France
Frederick Dancox	Worcestershire Regiment	9 October 1917	Boesinghe Sector, Belgium
Harry Daniels	Prince Consort's Own (Rifle Brigade)	12 March 1915	Neuve Chapelle, France
Wilbur Dartnell	Royal Fusiliers	3 September 1915*	Maktau, Kenya
Darwan Negi	39th Garhwal Rifles	23–24 November 1914	Festubert, France
Phillip Davey	10th Battalion, AIF	28 June 1918	Merris, France
James Davies	Royal Welsh Fusiliers	31 July 1917*^{[C]}	Polygon Wood, Belgium
John Davies	Prince of Wales's Volunteers (South Lancashire Regiment)	24 March 1918	Eppeville, France
Joseph Davies	Royal Welsh Fusiliers	20 July 1916	Delville Wood, France
James Dawson	Corps of Royal Engineers	13 October 1915	Hohenzollern Redoubt, France
Sidney Day	Suffolk Regiment	26 August 1917	Hargicourt, France
John Daykins	York and Lancaster Regiment	20 October 1918	Solesmes, France
Frank de Pass	34th Prince Albert Victor's Own Poona Horse	24 November 1914*	Festubert, France
Edmund De Wind	Royal Irish Rifles	21 March 1918*	Grugies, France
Donald Dean	Queen's Own (Royal West Kent Regiment)	24–26 September 1918	Lens, France
Percy Dean	Royal Naval Volunteer Reserve	22–23 April 1918	Zeebrugge, Belgium
Maurice Dease	Royal Fusiliers	23 August 1914*	Mons, Belgium
John Dimmer	King's Royal Rifle Corps	12 November 1914	Klein Zillebeke, Belgium
Thomas Dinesen	42nd Battalion, CEF	12 August 1918	Parvillers, France
Frederick Dobson	Coldstream Guards	28 September 1914	Chavanne, France
George Dorrell	Royal Horse Artillery	1 September 1914	Néry, France
Eric Dougall	Royal Field Artillery	10 April 1918*	Messines, Belgium
Charles Doughty-Wylie	Royal Welsh Fusiliers	26 April 1915*	Gallipoli, Turkey
Angus Douglas-Hamilton	Queen's Own Cameron Highlanders	25–26 September 1915*	Hill 70, France
Robert Downie	Royal Dublin Fusiliers	23 October 1916	Lesboeufs, France
Martin Doyle	Royal Munster Fusiliers	2 September 1918	Reincourt, France
Job Drain	Royal Field Artillery	26 August 1914	Le Cateau, France
Alfred Drake	Prince Consort's Own (Rifle Brigade)	23 November 1915*	La Brique, Belgium
Tom Dresser	Green Howards	12 May 1917	Roeux, France
George Drewry	Royal Naval Reserve	25 April 1915	Gallipoli, Turkey
Geoffrey Drummond	Royal Naval Volunteer Reserve	9–10 May 1918	Ostend, Belgium
James Duffy	Royal Inniskilling Fusiliers	27 December 1917	Kereina Peak, Palestine
Robert Dunsire	Royal Scots (Lothian Regiment)	26 September 1915	Hill 70, France
William Dunstan	7th Battalion, AIF	9 August 1915	Gallipoli, Turkey
John Dunville	1st Royal Dragoons	24–25 June 1917*^{[C]}	Épehy, France
Edward Dwyer	East Surrey Regiment	20 April 1915	Hill 60, Belgium
John Dwyer	Australian Machine Gun Corps	26 September 1917	Zonnebeke, Belgium
Alexander Edwards	Seaforth Highlanders	31 July 1917	Ypres, Belgium
Frederick Edwards	Duke of Cambridge's Own (Middlesex Regiment)	26 September 1916	Thiepval, France
Wilfred Edwards	King's Own (Yorkshire Light Infantry)	16 August 1917	Langemarck, Belgium
Ernest Egerton	Sherwood Foresters	20 September 1917	Ypres, Belgium
Roland Elcock	Royal Scots (Lothian Regiment)	15 October 1918	Capelle St. Catherine, France
Neville Elliott-Cooper	Royal Fusiliers	30 November 1917	La Vacquerie, France
Wilfrith Elstob	Manchester Regiment	21 March 1918*	Saint-Quentin, France
James Emerson	Royal Inniskilling Fusiliers	6 December 1917*	La Vacquerie, France
John Erskine	Cameronians (Scottish Rifles)	22 June 1916	Givenchy, France
Arthur Evans	Lincolnshire Regiment	2 September 1918	Etaing, France
George Evans	Manchester Regiment	30 July 1916	Guillemont, France
Lewis Evans	Black Watch (Royal Highlanders)	4 October 1917	Zonnebeke, Belgium
William Faulds	1st South African Infantry Brigade	18 July 1916	Delville Wood, France
Norman Finch	Royal Marine Artillery	22–23 April 1918	Zeebrugge, Belgium
George Findlay	Corps of Royal Engineers	4 November 1918	Catillon, France
David Finlay	Black Watch (Royal Highlanders)	9 May 1915	Rue du Bois, France
Humphrey Firman	SS Julnar	24–25 April 1916*	Kut-el-Amara, Mesopotamia
Frederick Fisher	13th Battalion, CEF	22–23 April 1915*	Saint-Julien, Belgium
Alfred Fleming-Sandes	East Surrey Regiment	29 September 1915	Hohenzollern Redoubt, France
Gordon Flowerdew	Lord Strathcona's Horse (Royal Canadians)	31 March 1918*	Bois de Moreuil, France
James Forbes-Robertson	Border Regiment	11–12 April 1918	Vieux-Berquin, France
William Forshaw	Manchester Regiment	7–9 August 1915	Gallipoli, Turkey
Samuel Forsyth	New Zealand Engineers	24 August 1918*	Grévillers, France
Charles Foss	Bedfordshire Regiment	12 March 1915	Neuve Chapelle, France
Edward Foster	East Surrey Regiment	24 April 1917	Villers Plouich, France
John Fox-Russell	Royal Army Medical Corps	6 November 1917	Tel-el-Khuweilfeh, Palestine
Bernard Freyberg	Queen's (Royal West Surrey) Regiment	13 November 1916	Beaucourt sur Ancre, France
Samuel Frickleton	New Zealand Rifle Brigade	7 June 1917	Messines, Belgium
Cyril Frisby	Coldstream Guards	27 September 1918	Canal du Nord, France
Wilfred Fuller	Grenadier Guards	12 March 1915	Neuve Chapelle, France
William Fuller	Welsh Regiment	14 September 1914	Chivy-sur-Aisne, France
James Fynn	South Wales Borderers	9 April 1916	Sanna-i-Yat, Mesopotamia
Alfred Gaby	28th Battalion, AIF	8 August 1918*	Villers-Bretonneux, France
Charles Garforth	15th The King's Hussars	23 August 1914	Harmingnies, Belgium
Benjamin Geary	East Surrey Regiment	20–21 April 1915	Hill 60, Belgium
Robert Gee	Royal Fusiliers	30 November 1917	Masnieres, France
Albert Gill	King's Royal Rifle Corps	27 July 1916*	Delville Wood, France
Gobar Negi	39th Garhwal Rifles	10 March 1915*	Neuve Chapelle, France
Gobind Singh	28th Light Cavalry	30 November 1917 to 1 December 1917	Pezières, France
Sidney Godley	Royal Fusiliers	23 August 1914	Mons, Belgium
Herman Good	13th Battalion, CEF	8 August 1918	Hangard Wood, France
Bernard Gordon	41st Battalion, AIF	26–27 August 1918	Bray, France
Robert Gorle	Royal Field Artillery	1 October 1918	Ledegem, Belgium
William Gosling (VC)	Royal Field Artillery	5 April 1917	Arras, France
Cyril Gourley	Royal Field Artillery	30 November 1917	Épehy, France
Reginald Graham	Princess Louises's (Argyll and Sutherland Highlanders)	22 April 1917	Istabulat, Mesopotamia
John Grant	Wellington Infantry Regiment	1 September 1918	Bancourt, France
Fred Greaves	Sherwood Foresters	4 October 1917	Poelcapelle, Belgium
John Green	Royal Army Medical Corps	1 July 1916*	Foncquevillers, France
Harry Greenwood	King's Own (Yorkshire Light Infantry)	23–24 October 1918	Ovillers, France
Milton Gregg	Royal Canadian Regiment	27 September 1918 to 1 October 1918	Cambrai, France
William Gregg	Prince Consort's Own (Rifle Brigade)	6 May 1918	Bucquoy, France
Francis Grenfell	9th Lancers	24 August 1914	Audregnies, Belgium
Julian Gribble	Royal Warwickshire Regiment	23 March 1918	Beaumetz, France
Robert Grieve	37th Battalion, AIF	7 June 1917	Messines, Belgium
William Grimbaldeston	King's Own Scottish Borderers	16 August 1917	Wijdendrift, Belgium
John Grimshaw	Lancashire Fusiliers	25 April 1915	Gallipoli, Turkey
George Grogan	Worcestershire Regiment	27 May 1918	River Aisne, France
William Hackett	Corps of Royal Engineers	22–23 June 1916*	Givenchy, France
Reginald Haine	Honourable Artillery Company	28–29 April 1917	Gavrelle, France
Arthur Hall	54th Battalion, AIF	1 September 1918	Péronne, France
Frederick Hall	8th Battalion, CEF	23–24 April 1915*	Ypres, Belgium
Joel Halliwell	Lancashire Fusiliers	27 May 1918	Muscourt, France
Rupert Hallowes	Duke of Cambridge's Own (Middlesex Regiment)	25–30 September 1915*	Hooge, Belgium
Albert Halton	King's Own (Royal Lancaster Regiment)	12 October 1917	Poelcapelle, Belgium
John Brown Hamilton	Highland Light Infantry	25–26 September 1917	Ypres-Menin Road, Belgium
John Patrick Hamilton	3rd Battalion, AIF	9 August 1915	Gallipoli, Turkey
Robert Hanna	29th Battalion, CEF	21 August 1917	Hill 70, France
Percy Hansen	Lincolnshire Regiment	9 August 1915	Gallipoli, Turkey
Theodore Hardy	Royal Army Chaplains' Department	7 July 1918	Bucquoy, France
Thomas Harris	Queen's Own (Royal West Kent Regiment)	9 August 1918*	Morlancourt, France
Arthur Harrison	HMS Vindictive	22–23 April 1918*	Zeebrugge, Belgium
John Harrison	East Yorkshire Regiment	3 May 1917*	Oppy, France
Francis Harvey	Royal Marine Light Infantry	31 May 1916*	Battle of Jutland, Denmark
Frederick Harvey	Lord Strathcona's Horse (Royal Canadians)	27 March 1917	Guyencourt, France
Jack Harvey	London Regiment	2 September 1918	Péronne, France
Norman Harvey	Royal Inniskilling Fusiliers	25 October 1918	Ingoyghem, Belgium
Samuel Harvey	York and Lancaster Regiment	29 September 1915	Hohenzollern Redoubt, France
Lanoe Hawker	No. 6 Squadron RFC	25 July 1915	France
Reginald Hayward	Duke of Edinburgh's (Wiltshire Regiment)	21–22 March 1918	Frémicourt, France
Michael Heaviside	Durham Light Infantry	6 May 1917	Fontaine-lès-Croisilles, France
Frederick Hedges	Bedfordshire Regiment	24 October 1918	Boursies, France
Arthur Henderson	Princess Louises's (Argyll and Sutherland Highlanders)	23 April 1917*	Fontaine-lès-Croisilles, France
Edward Henderson	Prince of Wales's (North Staffordshire Regiment)	25 January 1917*	River Hai, Mesopotamia
Alfred Herring	Royal Army Service Corps	23–24 March 1918	Montagne Bridge, France
James Hewitson	King's Own (Royal Lancaster Regiment)	26 April 1918	Givenchy, France
Dennis Hewitt	Hampshire Regiment	31 July 1917*	Ypres, Belgium
William Hewitt	2nd South African Light Infantry	20 September 1917	Ypres, Belgium
Albert Hill	Royal Welsh Fusiliers	20 July 1916	Delville Wood, France
David Hirsch	Green Howards	23 April 1917*	Wancourt, France
Frederick Hobson	20th Battalion, CEF	18 August 1917*	Lens, France
John Hogan	Manchester Regiment	29 October 1914	Festubert, France
Norman Holbrook	HMS B11	13 December 1914	Dardanelles, Turkey
John Holland	Prince of Wales's Leinster Regiment	3 September 1916	Guillemont, France
Frederick Holmes	King's Own (Yorkshire Light Infantry)	26 August 1914	Le Cateau, France
Thomas Holmes	2nd Battalion, CEF	26 October 1917	Passchendaele, Belgium
William Holmes	Grenadier Guards	9 October 1918*	Cattenieres, France
Samuel Honey	78th Battalion, CEF	27 September to 30 September 1918*	Bourlon Wood, France
Ernest Horlock	Royal Field Artillery	15 September 1914	Vendresse, France
Basil Horsfall	East Lancashire Regiment	21 March 1918*	Moyenneville, France
George Howell	1st Battalion, AIF	6 May 1917	Bullecourt, France
Charles Hudson	Sherwood Foresters	15 June 1918	Asiago, Italy
James Huffam	Duke of Wellington's (West Riding Regiment)	31 August 1918	St. Servin's Farm, France
Thomas Hughes	Connaught Rangers	3 September 1916	Guillemont, France
Charles Hull	21st Lancers	5 September 1915	Hafiz Kor, India
David Hunter	Highland Light Infantry	16–17 September 1918	Moeuvres, France
Bellenden Hutcheson	Royal Canadian Army Medical Corps	2 September 1918	Drocourt-Quéant, France
James Hutchinson	Lancashire Fusiliers	28 June 1916	Ficheux, France
Arthur Hutt	Royal Warwickshire Regiment	4 October 1917	Poelcapelle, Belgium
George Ingram	24th Battalion, AIF	4 October 1918	Montbrehain, France
Gilbert Insall	No. 11 Squadron RFC	7 November 1915	Achiet, France
Reginald Inwood	10th Battalion, AIF	19–22 September 1917	Polygon Wood, Belgium
Albert Jacka	14th Battalion, AIF	19–20 May 1915	Gallipoli, Turkey
Harold Jackson	East Yorkshire Regiment	22 March 1918	Hermies, France
Thomas Jackson	Coldstream Guards	27 September 1918*	Canal du Nord, France
William Jackson	17th Battalion, AIF	25 June 1916	Armentières, France
Herbert James	Worcestershire Regiment	28 June 1915	Gallipoli, Turkey
Manley James	Gloucestershire Regiment	21–23 March 1918	Velu Wood, France
George Jarratt	Royal Fusiliers	3 May 1917*	Pelves, France
Charles Jarvis	Corps of Royal Engineers	23 August 1914	Jemappes, Belgium
Clarence Jeffries	34th Battalion, AIF	12 October 1917*	Passchendaele, Belgium
Jørgen Jensen	50th Battalion, AIF	2 April 1917	Noreuil, France
Alan Jerrard	No. 66 Squadron RFC	30 March 1918	Mansue, Italy
Dudley Johnson	Royal Sussex Regiment	4 November 1918	Sambre-Oise Canal, France
Frederick Johnson	Corps of Royal Engineers	25 September 1915	Hill 70, France
James Johnson	Northumberland Fusiliers	14 October 1918	Wez Macquart, France
William Johnson	Sherwood Foresters	3 October 1918	Ramicourt, France
William Johnston	Corps of Royal Engineers	14 September 1914	Missy, France
David Jones	King's (Liverpool Regiment)	3 September 1916	Guillemont, France
Loftus Jones	HMS Shark	31 May 1916*	Battle of Jutland, Denmark
Richard Jones	Loyal North Lancashire Regiment	21 May 1916*	Vimy, France
Thomas Jones	Cheshire Regiment	25 September 1916	Morval, France
Eustace Jotham	51st Sikhs	7 January 1915*	Spina Khaisora, India
William Joynt	8th Battalion, AIF	23 August 1918	Herleville Wood, France
Reginald Judson	New Zealand and Australian Division	26 August 1918	Bapaume, France
Joseph Kaeble	22nd Battalion, CEF	8 June 1918	Neuville-Vitasse, France
Karanbahadur Rana	3rd Queen Alexandra's Own Gurkha Rifles	10 April 1918	El Kefr, Egypt
Henry Kelly	Duke of Wellington's (West Riding Regiment)	4 October 1916	Le Sars, France
William Kenealy	Lancashire Fusiliers	25 April 1915	Gallipoli, Turkey
Henry Kenny	Loyal North Lancashire Regiment	25 September 1915	Loos, France
Thomas Kenny	Durham Light Infantry	4 November 1915	La Houssoie, France
Thomas Bede Kenny	2nd Battalion, AIF	9 April 1917	Hermies, France
William Kenny	Gordon Highlanders	23 October 1914	Ypres, Belgium
Allan Ker	Gordon Highlanders	21 March 1918	Saint-Quentin, France
George Kerr	3rd Battalion, CEF	27 September 1918	Bourlon Wood, France
John Kerr	4th Battalion, CEF	16 September 1916	Courcelette, France
Leonard Keysor	1st Battalion, AIF	7 August 1915	Gallipoli, Turkey
Leonard Keyworth	London Regiment	25–26 May 1915	Givenchy, France
Khudadad Khan	129th Duke of Connaught's Own Baluchis	31 October 1914	Hollebeke, Belgium
Arthur Kilby	South Staffordshire Regiment	25 September 1915*	Cuinchy, France
Cecil Kinross	49th Battalion, CEF	30 October 1917	Passchendaele, Belgium
James Kirk	Manchester Regiment	4 November 1918*	Ors, France
Alfred Knight	Post Office Rifles	20 September 1917	Ypres, Belgium
Arthur Knight	10th Battalion, CEF	2 September 1918*	Villers-les-Cagnicourt, France
Cecil Knox	Corps of Royal Engineers	22 March 1918	Tugny, France
Filip Konowal	47th Battalion, CEF	22–24 August 1917	Lens, France
Kulbir Thapa	3rd Queen Alexandra's Own Gurkha Rifles	25 September 1915	Fauquissart, France
Alexander Lafone	1st County of London Yeomanry (Middlesex, Duke of Cambridge's Hussars)	27 October 1917*	El Buggar Ridge, Palestine
Daniel Laidlaw	King's Own Scottish Borderers	25 September 1915	Loos, France
Lala	41st Dogras	21 January 1916	El Orah, Mesopotamia
Arthur Lascelles	Durham Light Infantry	3 December 1917	Masnières, France
David Lauder	Royal Scots Fusiliers	13 August 1915	Gallipoli, Turkey
Harry Laurent	New Zealand Rifle Brigade	12 September 1918	Gouzeaucourt Wood, France
James Leach	Manchester Regiment	29 October 1914	Festubert, France
John Leak	9th Battalion, AIF	23 July 1916	Pozières, France
Okill Learmonth	2nd Battalion, CEF	18 August 1917*	Loos, France
Frank Lester	Lancashire Fusiliers	12 October 1918	Neuvilly, France
Hubert Lewis	Welsh Regiment	22–23 October 1916*	Macukovo, Greece
Leonard Lewis	Northamptonshire Regiment	18–21 September 1918*	Rossnoy, France
John Liddell	Princess Louises's (Argyll and Sutherland Highlanders)	31 July 1915*^{[C]}	Ostend, Belgium
Joseph Lister	Lancashire Fusiliers	9 October 1917	Ypres, Belgium
Arnold Loosemore	Duke of Wellington's (West Riding Regiment)	11 August 1917	Langemarck, Belgium
Stewart Loudoun-Shand	Green Howards	1 July 1916*	Fricourt, France
Albert Lowerson	21st Battalion, AIF	1 September 1918	Mont St. Quentin, France
Frederick Luke	Royal Field Artillery	26 August 1914	Le Cateau, France
Frederick Lumsden	Royal Marine Artillery	3–4 April 1917	Francilly, France
Graham Lyall	102nd Battalion, CEF	27 September 1918	Cambrai, France
John Lynn	Lancashire Fusiliers	2 May 1915	Ypres, Belgium
Thain MacDowell	38th Battalion, CEF	9 April 1917	Vimy Ridge, France
John MacGregor	2nd Canadian Mounted Rifles	29 September 1918 to 3 October 1918	Cambrai, France
David MacIntyre	Princess Louises's (Argyll and Sutherland Highlanders)	24 August 1918; 27 August 1918	Hénin-sur-Cojeul, France
James MacKenzie	Scots Guards	19 December 1914*	Rouges Bancs, France
Donald MacKintosh	Seaforth Highlanders	11 April 1917*	Fampoux, France
Robert MacTier	23rd Battalion, AIF	1 September 1918*	Mont St. Quentin, France
George Maling	Royal Army Medical Corps	25 September 1915	Fauquissart, France
Wilfred Malleson	HMS River Clyde	25 April 1915	Gallipoli, Turkey
Edward Mannock	No. 85 Squadron RFC	17 June 1918 to 26 July 1918*	Over France
William Mariner	King's Royal Rifle Corps	22 May 1915	Cambrin, France
James Marshall	Irish Guards	4 November 1918*	Sambre-Oise Canal, France
Cyril Martin	Corps of Royal Engineers	12 March 1915	Spanbroek Molen, Belgium
Richard Masters	Royal Army Service Corps	9 April 1918	Béthune, France
Thomas Maufe	Royal Garrison Artillery	4 June 1917	Feuchy, France
Joseph Maxwell	18th Battalion, AIF	3 October 1918	Beaurevoir, France
Henry May	Cameronians (Scottish Rifles)	22 October 1914	La Boutillerie, France
Tom Mayson	King's Own (Royal Lancaster Regiment)	31 July 1917	Wieltje, Belgium
John McAulay	Scots Guards	27 November 1917	Fontaine Notre Dame, France
Robert McBeath	Seaforth Highlanders	20 November 1917	Cambrai, France
Lawrence McCarthy	16th Battalion, AIF	23 August 1918	Madam Wood, France
James McCudden	No. 56 Squadron RFC	August 1917 to March 1918	France
Stanley McDougall	47th Battalion, AIF	28 March 1918	Dernancourt, France
William McFadzean	Royal Irish Rifles	1 July 1916*	Thiepval Wood, France
Lewis McGee	40th Battalion, AIF	4 October 1917	Ypres, Belgium
David McGregor	Royal Scots (Lothian Regiment)	22 October 1918	Hoogemolen, Belgium
Louis McGuffie	King's Own Scottish Borderers	28 September 1918*	Wytschaete, Belgium
George McIntosh	Gordon Highlanders	31 July 1917	Ypres, Belgium
Hugh McIver	Royal Scots (Lothian Regiment)	23 August 1918	Courcelles-le-Comte, France
George McKean	14th Battalion, CEF	27–28 April 1918	Gavrelle Sector, France
Albert McKenzie	HMS Vindictive	22–23 April 1918	Zeebrugge, Belgium
Hugh McKenzie	Canadian Machine Gun Corps	30 October 1917*	Meetscheele Spur, Belgium
Alan McLeod	No. 2 Squadron RFC	27 March 1918	Albert, France
Eric McNair	Royal Sussex Regiment	14 February 1916	Hooge, Belgium
William McNally	Green Howards	27 October 1918	Piave River, Italy
Frank McNamara	No. 1 Squadron AFC	20 March 1917	Egypt
John McNamara	East Surrey Regiment	3 September 1918	Lens, France
Frederick McNess	Scots Guards	15 September 1916	Ginchy, France
James McPhie	Corps of Royal Engineers	14 October 1918*	Aubencheul-au-Bac, France
Allastair McReady-Diarmid	Duke of Cambridge's Own (Middlesex Regiment)	30 November 1917 to 1 December 1917*	Moeuvres, France
Arthur Martin-Leake^{[D]}	Royal Army Medical Corps	29 October 1914; 8 November 1914	Zonnebeke, Belgium
Samuel Meekosha	Prince of Wales's Own (West Yorkshire Regiment)	19 November 1915	Yser, France
John Meikle	Seaforth Highlanders	20 July 1918	Marfaux, France
Edward Mellish	Royal Army Chaplains' Department	27–29 March 1916	St. Eloi, Belgium
Charles Melvin	Black Watch (Royal Highlanders)	21 April 1917	Istabulat, Mesopotamia
William Merrifield	4th Battalion, CEF	1 October 1918	Abancourt, France
William Metcalf	16th Battalion, CEF	2 September 1918	Arras, France
Francis Miles	Gloucestershire Regiment	23 October 1918	Bois de L'Eveque, France
James Miller	King's Own (Royal Lancaster Regiment)	30–31 July 1916*	Bazentin-le-Petit, France
Walter Mills	Manchester Regiment	10–11 December 1917*	Givenchy, France
William Milne	16th Battalion, CEF	9 April 1917*	Thelus, France
Harry Miner	58th Battalion, CEF	8 August 1918*	Demuin, France
Mir Dast	55th Coke's Rifles (Frontier Force)	26 April 1915	Wieltje, Belgium
Coulson Mitchell	4th Canadian Engineers	8–9 October 1918	Canal de L'Escaut, France
Martin Moffat	Prince of Wales's Leinster Regiment	14 October 1918	Ledegem, Belgium
John Molyneux	Royal Fusiliers	9 October 1917	Langemarck, Belgium
Mick Moon	58th Battalion, AIF	12 May 1917	Bullecourt, France
George Moor	Hampshire Regiment	5 June 1915	Gallipoli, Turkey
Montague Moore	Hampshire Regiment	20 September 1917	Ypres, Belgium
Robert Morrow	Royal Irish Fusiliers (Princess Victoria's)	12 April 1915	Messines, Belgium
Edward Mott	Border Regiment	27 January 1917	Le Transloy, France
Thomas Mottershead	No. 20 Squadron RFC	7 January 1917*	Ploegsteert Wood, Belgium
Albert Mountain	Prince of Wales's Own (West Yorkshire Regiment)	26 March 1918	Hamelincourt, France
John Moyney	Irish Guards	12–13 September 1917	Broembeek, Belgium
Harold Mugford	Machine Gun Corps	11 April 1917	Monchy-le-Preux, France
George Mullin	Princess Patricia's Canadian Light Infantry	30 October 1917	Passchendaele, Belgium
Harry Murray	13th Battalion, AIF	4–5 February 1917	Gueudecourt, France
Edgar Myles	Welsh Regiment	9 April 1916	Sanna-i-Yat, Mesopotamia
Martin Nasmith	HMS E11	20 May 1915 to 8 June 1915	Dardanelles, Turkey
Philip Neame	Corps of Royal Engineers	19 December 1914	Neuve Chapelle, France
Samuel Needham	Bedfordshire Regiment	10–11 September 1918	Kefr Kasim, Palestine
Thomas Neely	King's Own (Royal Lancaster Regiment)	27 September 1918*	Flesquières, France
David Nelson	Royal Horse Artillery	1 September 1914	Néry, France
James Newland	12th Battalion, AIF	7–14 April 1917^{[A]}	Bapaume, France
Henry Nicholas	Canterbury Regiment	3 December 1917	Polderhoek, Belgium
Cecil Noble	Prince Consort's Own (Rifle Brigade)	12 March 1915	Neuve Chapelle, France
Claude Nunney	38th Battalion, CEF	1–2 September 1918	Drocourt-Quéant Line, France
James Ockendon	Royal Dublin Fusiliers	4 October 1917	Langemark, Belgium
Christopher O'Kelly	52nd Battalion, CEF	26 October 1917	Passchendaele, Belgium
Michael O'Leary	Irish Guards	1 February 1915	Cuinchy, France
Martin O'Meara	16th Battalion, AIF	9–12 August 1916	Pozières, France
John O'Neill	Prince of Wales's Leinster Regiment	14 October 1918	Moorsele, Belgium
George Onions	Devonshire Regiment	22 August 1918	Achiet-le-Petit, France
John Ormsby	King's Own (Yorkshire Light Infantry)	14 April 1917	Favet, France
Michael O'Rourke	7th Battalion, CEF	15–17 August 1917	Hill 60, France
Gerald O'Sullivan	Royal Inniskilling Fusiliers	1–2 July 1915	Gallipoli, Turkey
Frederick Palmer	Royal Fusiliers	16–17 February 1917	Courcelette, France
Walter Parker	Royal Marine Light Infantry	30 April 1915 to 1 May 1915	Gallipoli, Turkey
Frederick Parslow	Royal Naval Reserve	4 July 1915*	Atlantic Ocean
Hardy Parsons	Gloucestershire Regiment	20–21 August 1917	Épehy, France
George Paton	Grenadier Guards	1 December 1917*	Gonnelieu, France
John Pattison	50th Battalion, CEF	10 April 1917	Vimy Ridge, France
George Peachment	King's Royal Rifle Corps	25 September 1915*	Hulluch, France
George Pearkes	5th Battalion Canadian Mounted Rifles	30–31 October 1917	Passchendaele, Belgium
Cyrus Peck	16th Battalion, CEF	2 September 1918	Cagnicourt, France
Walter Peeler	3rd Battalion, AIF	4 October 1917	Ypres, Belgium
Robert Phillips	Royal Warwickshire Regiment	25 January 1917	Kut, Mesopotamia
Ernest Pitcher	HMS Dunraven	8 August 1917	Bay of Biscay, Atlantic Ocean
Alfred Pollard	Honourable Artillery Company	29 April 1917	Gavrelle, France
James Pollock	Queen's Own Cameron Highlanders	27 September 1915	Hohenzollern Redoubt, France
Charles Pope	11th Battalion, AIF	15 April 1917*	Louveral, France
Frederick Potts	Berkshire Yeomanry	21 August 1915	Gallipoli, Turkey
Arthur Poulter	Duke of Wellington's (West Riding Regiment)	10 April 1918	Erquinghem, France
Arthur Procter	King's (Liverpool Regiment)	4 June 1916	Ficheux, France
George Prowse	Royal Naval Division	2 September 1918	Pronville, France
Thomas Pryce	Grenadier Guards	11–12 April 1918*	Vieux-Berquin, France
Robert Quigg	Royal Irish Rifles	1 July 1916	Hamel, France
Harry Ranken	Royal Army Medical Corps	19–20 September 1914*	Haute-Avesnes, France
William Ratcliffe	Prince of Wales's Volunteers (South Lancashire Regiment)	14 June 1917	Messines, Belgium
Walter Rayfield	7th Battalion, CEF	2–4 September 1918	Arras, France
John Raynes	Royal Field Artillery	11 October 1915	Béthune, France
Anketell Read	Northamptonshire Regiment	25 September 1915*	Hulluch, France
John Readitt	Prince of Wales's Volunteers (South Lancashire Regiment)	25 February 1917	Alqayat-al-Gaharbigah Bend, Mesopotamia
Ivor Rees	South Wales Borderers	31 July 1917	Pilkem, Belgium
Lionel Rees	No. 32 Squadron RFC	1 July 1916	Double Crassieurs, France
Oswald Reid	King's (Liverpool Regiment)	8–10 March 1917	Dialah River, Mesopotamia
Thomas Rendle	Duke of Cornwall's Light Infantry	20 November 1914	Wulverghem, Belgium
Douglas Reynolds	Royal Field Artillery	26 August 1914; 9 September 1914	Le Cateau, France
Henry Reynolds	Royal Scots (Lothian Regiment)	20 September 1917	Frezenberg, Belgium
John Rhodes	Grenadier Guards	9 October 1917	Houthulst Forest, Belgium
William Rhodes-Moorhouse	No. 2 Squadron RFC	26 April 1915*	Kortrijk, Belgium
Alfred Richards	Lancashire Fusiliers	25 April 1915	Gallipoli, Turkey
James Richardson	16th Battalion, CEF	8 October 1916*	Somme, France
Thomas Ricketts	Royal Newfoundland Regiment	14 October 1918	Ledeghem, Belgium
Frederick Riggs	York and Lancaster Regiment	1 October 1918*	Epinoy, France
John Ripley	Black Watch (Royal Highlanders)	9 May 1915	Rue du Bois, France
Henry Ritchie	HMS Goliath	28 November 1914	Dar es Salaam, Tanganyika
Walter Ritchie	Seaforth Highlanders	1 July 1916	Beaumont-Hamel, France
Jacob Rivers	Sherwood Foresters	12 March 1915*	Neuve Chapelle, France
Frank Roberts	Worcestershire Regiment	22 March 1918 to 2 April 1918	Pargny, France
Charles Robertson	Royal Fusiliers	8–9 March 1918	Polderhoek Chateau, Belgium
Clement Robertson	Queen's (Royal West Surrey) Regiment	4 October 1917	Zonnebeke, Belgium
James Robertson	27th Battalion, CEF	6 November 1917*	Passchendaele, Belgium
Eric Robinson	HMS Vengeance	26 February 1915	Dardanelles, Turkey
Leefe Robinson	No. 39 Squadron RFC	2–3 September 1916	Cuffley, England
Henry Robson	Royal Scots (Lothian Regiment)	14 December 1914	Kemmel, Belgium
Frederick Room	Royal Irish Regiment	16 August 1917	Frezenberg, Belgium
George Roupell	East Surrey Regiment	20 April 1915	Hill 60, Belgium
Charles Rutherford	5th Battalion Canadian Mounted Rifles	26 August 1918	Monchy, France
William Ruthven	22nd Battalion, AIF	19 May 1918	Ville-sur-Ancre, France
John Ryan	55th Battalion, AIF	30 September 1918	Hindenburg Defences, France
Robert Ryder	Duke of Cambridge's Own (Middlesex Regiment)	26 September 1916	Thiepval, France
Clifford Sadlier	51st Battalion, AIF	24–25 April 1918	Villers-Bretonneux, France
Thomas Sage	Somerset Light Infantry (Prince Albert's)	4 October 1917	Ypres, Belgium
George Samson	Royal Naval Reserve	25 April 1915	Gallipoli, Turkey
George Sanders	Prince of Wales's Own (West Yorkshire Regiment)	1 July 1916	Thiepval, France
William Sanders	HMS Prize	30 April 1917	Atlantic
Richard Sandford	HMS C3	22–23 April 1918	Zeebrugge, Belgium
Arthur Saunders	Suffolk Regiment	26 September 1915	Loos, France
John Sayer	Queen's (Royal West Surrey) Regiment	21 March 1918^{[C]}	Le Verguier, France
John Schofield	Lancashire Fusiliers	9 April 1918*	Givenchy, France
Francis Scrimger	Royal Canadian Army Medical Corps	25 April 1915	Saint-Julien, Belgium
Ernest Seaman	Royal Inniskilling Fusiliers	29 September 1918*	Terhand, Belgium
Cecil Sewell	Queen's Own (Royal West Kent Regiment)	29 August 1918*	Fremicourt, France
Shahamad Khan	89th Punjab Regiment	12–13 April 1916	Beit Ayeesa, Mesopotamia
Robert Shankland	43rd Battalion, CEF	26 October 1917	Passchendaele, Belgium
Charles Sharpe	Lincolnshire Regiment	9 May 1915	Rouges Bancs, France
Albert Shepherd	King's Royal Rifle Corps	20 November 1917	Villers Plouich, France
John Sherwood-Kelly	Norfolk Regiment	20 November 1917	Marcoing, France
William Short	Green Howards	6 August 1916*	Munster Alley, France
Alfred Shout	1st Battalion, AIF	9 August 1915*	Gallipoli, Turkey
Ellis Sifton	18th Battalion, CEF	9 April 1917*	Neuville-S^{t.}-Vaast, France
Badlu Singh	14th Murray's Jat Lancers	23 September 1918*	River Jordan, Palestine
John Sinton	Indian Medical Service	21 January 1916	Orah Ruins, Mesopotamia
John Skinner	King's Own Scottish Borderers	18 August 1917	Wijdendrift, Belgium
Alfred Smith	East Lancashire Regiment	23 December 1915	Gallipoli, Turkey
Archibald Smith	Royal Naval Reserve	10 March 1917*	Atlantic Ocean
Edward Smith	Lancashire Fusiliers	21–23 August 1918	Serre, France
Issy Smith	Manchester Regiment	26 April 1915	Saint-Julien, Belgium
James Smith	Border Regiment	21 December 1914	Rouges Bancs, France
John Smyth	15th Ludhiana Sikhs	18 May 1915	Richebourg L'Aouve, France
James Somers	Royal Inniskilling Fusiliers	1–2 July 1915	Gallipoli, Turkey
Charles Spackman	Border Regiment	20 November 1917	Marcoing, France
Robert Spall	Princess Patricia's Canadian Light Infantry	13 August 1918	Parvillers, France
Percy Statton	40th Battalion, AIF	10–12 August 1918	Proyart, France
Thomas Steele	Seaforth Highlanders	22 February 1917	Sanna-i-Yat, Mesopotamia
Charles Stone	Royal Field Artillery	21 March 1918	Caponne Farm, France
Walter Stone	Royal Fusiliers	30 November 1917*	Cambrai, France
Percy Storkey	19th Battalion, AIF	7 April 1918	Hangard Wood, France
Harcus Strachan	The Fort Garry Horse, CEF	20 November 1917	Masnieres, France
George Stringer	Manchester Regiment	8 March 1916	Es Sinn, Mesopotamia
Ronald Stuart	HMS Pargust	7 June 1917	Atlantic Ocean
Frank Stubbs	Lancashire Fusiliers	25 April 1915*	Gallipoli, Turkey
Ernest Sykes	Northumberland Fusiliers	9 April 1917	Arras, France
William Symons	7th Battalion, AIF	8–9 August 1915	Gallipoli, Turkey
James Tait	78th Battalion, CEF	11 August 1918*	Amiens, France
Henry Tandey	Duke of Wellington's (West Riding Regiment)	28 September 1918	Marcoing, France
John Thomas	Prince of Wales's (North Staffordshire Regiment)	30 November 1917	Cambrai, France
Hugo Throssell	10th Light Horse Regiment	29–30 August 1915	Gallipoli, Turkey
Arthur Tisdall	Royal Naval Volunteer Reserve	25 April 1915	Gallipoli, Turkey
Ross Tollerton	Queen's Own Cameron Highlanders	14 September 1914	Battle of the Aisne, France
Joseph Tombs	King's (Liverpool Regiment)	16 May 1915	Rue du Bois, France
James Towers	Cameronians (Scottish Rifles)	6 October 1918	Méricourt, France
Edgar Towner	Australian Machine Gun Corps	1 September 1918	Mont St. Quentin, France
Alfred Toye	Duke of Cambridge's Own (Middlesex Regiment)	25 March 1918	Eterpigny Ridge, France
Charles Train	London Scottish Regiment	8 December 1917	Air Karim, Palestine
Richard Travis	Otago Infantry Regiment	24 July 1918*	Rossignol Wood, France
Frederick Tubb	7th Battalion, AIF	9 August 1915	Gallipoli, Turkey
James Turnbull	Highland Light Infantry	1 July 1916*	Authuille, France
Alexander Turner	Princess Charlotte of Wales's (Royal Berkshire Regiment)	28 September 1915*^{[C]}	Vermelles, France
Thomas Turrall	Worcestershire Regiment	3 July 1916	La Boiselle, France
Edward Unwin	HMS River Clyde	25 April 1915	Gallipoli, Turkey
James Upton	Sherwood Foresters	9 May 1915	Rouges Bancs, France
John Vallentin	South Staffordshire Regiment	7 November 1914*	Zillebeke, Belgium
Bernard Vann	Sherwood Foresters	29 September 1918	Bellenglise, France
Theodore Veale	Devonshire Regiment	20 July 1916	High Wood, France
John Vereker	Grenadier Guards	27 September 1918	Canal du Nord, France
Arthur Vickers	Royal Warwickshire Regiment	25 September 1915	Hulloch, France
Geoffrey Vickers	Sherwood Foresters	14 October 1915	Hohenzollern Redoubt, France
Richard Wain	Tank Corps	20 November 1917*	Marcoing, France
Garth Walford	Royal Artillery	26 April 1915*	Gallipoli, Turkey
Samuel Wallace	Royal Field Artillery	20 November 1917	Gonnelieu, France
Horace Waller	King's Own (Yorkshire Light Infantry)	10 April 1917*	Heninel, France
Sidney Ware	Seaforth Highlanders	6 April 1916	Sanna-i-Yat, Mesopotamia
William Waring	Royal Welsh Fusiliers	18 September 1918*	Ronssoy, France
Blair Wark	32nd Battalion, AIF	29 September 1918 to 1 October 1918	Bellicourt, France
Reginald Warneford	No. 1 Squadron RNAS	7 June 1915	Ghent, Belgium
Edward Warner	Bedfordshire Regiment	1 May 1915*	Ypres, Belgium
Arnold Waters	Corps of Royal Engineers	4 November 1918	Ors, France
Oliver Watson	King's Own (Yorkshire Light Infantry)	28 March 1918*	Rossignol Wood, France
Joseph Watt	Royal Naval Reserve	15 May 1917	Straits of Otranto, Italy
Henry Weale	Royal Welsh Fusiliers	26 August 1918	Bazentin-le-Grand, France
Frank Wearne	Essex Regiment	28 June 1917*	Loos, France
Lawrence Weathers	43rd Battalion, AIF	2 September 1918	Péronne, France
James Welch	Princess Charlotte of Wales's (Royal Berkshire Regiment)	29 April 1917	Oppy, Pas-de-Calais, France
Harry Wells	Royal Sussex Regiment	25 September 1915*	Le Rutoire, France
Ferdinand West	No. 8 Squadron RFC	12 August 1918	Over France
Richard West	North Irish Horse	21 August 1918; 2 September 1918*	Courcelles-le-Comte, France
George Wheeler	9th Gurkha Rifles	23 February 1917	Shumran, Mesopotamia
George Wheeler	7th Hariana Lancers	12–13 April 1915*	Shaiba, Mesopotamia
Albert White	South Wales Borderers	19 May 1917*	Monchy-le-Preux, France
Archie White	Green Howards	21 September 1916 to 1 October 1916	Stuff Redoubt, France
Geoffrey White	HMS E14	28 January 1918*	Dardanelles, Turkey
Jack White	King's Own (Royal Lancaster Regiment)	7 March 1917	Dialah River, Mesopotamia
William White	Machine Gun Corps	18 September 1918	Gouzeaucourt, France
Harold Whitfield	King's (Shropshire Light Infantry)	10 March 1918	Burj El Lisaneh, Egypt
Thomas Whitham	Coldstream Guards	31 July 1917	Pilkem, Belgium
John Whittle	12th Battalion, AIF	9–10 April 1917	Boursies, France
Alfred Wilcox	Oxfordshire and Buckinghamshire Light Infantry	12 September 1918	Laventie, France
Alfred Wilkinson	Manchester Regiment	20 October 1918	Marou, France
Thomas Wilkinson	Loyal North Lancashire Regiment	5 July 1916	La Boiselle, France
Jack Williams	South Wales Borderers	7–8 October 1918	Villers Outreaux, France
William Williams	Royal Naval Reserve, HMS Pargust	7 June 1917	Atlantic
William Williams	HMS River Clyde	25 April 1915*	Gallipoli, Turkey
Richard Willis	Lancashire Fusiliers	25 April 1915	Gallipoli, Turkey
George Wilson	Highland Light Infantry	14 September 1914	Verneuill, France
Harry Wood	Scots Guards	13 October 1918	St. Python, France
Wilfred Wood	Northumberland Fusiliers	28 October 1918	Casa Vana, Italy
Joseph Woodall	Prince Consort's Own (Rifle Brigade)	11 April 1918	La Pannerie, France
Thomas Woodcock	Irish Guards	12–13 September 1917	Broenbeek, Belgium
Sidney Woodroffe	Prince Consort's Own (Rifle Brigade)	30 July 1915*	Hooge, Belgium
James Woods	48th Battalion, AIF	18 September 1918	Le Verguier, France
Geoffrey Woolley	Queen Victoria's Rifles	20–21 April 1915	Hill 60, Belgium
Theodore Wright	Corps of Royal Engineers	23 August 1914; 14 September 1914*	Mons, Belgium
George Wyatt	Coldstream Guards	25–26 August 1914	Landrecies, France
Charles Yate	King's Own (Yorkshire Light Infantry)	26 August 1914	Le Cateau, France
Frederick Youens	Durham Light Infantry	7 July 1917*	Hill 60, Belgium
Jack Youll	Northumberland Fusiliers	15 June 1918	Asiago, Italy
Frank Young	Hertfordshire Regiment	18 September 1918*	Havrincourt, France
John Young	87th Battalion, CEF	2 September 1918	Dury-Arras Sector, France
Thomas Young	Durham Light Infantry	25–31 March 1918	Bucquoy, France
William Young	East Lancashire Regiment	22 December 1915	Fonquevillers, France
Raphael Zengel	5th Battalion (Western Cavalry), CEF	9 August 1918	Warvillers, France

== Footnotes ==
A Victoria Cross was awarded for several acts in the time period.
B Chavasse died of his wounds two days after the deed which merited his second Victoria Cross.
C Died of his wounds
D Martin-Leake's second Victoria Cross
