= Elcock =

Elcock is a surname. Notable people with the surname include:

- Ancil Elcock (born 1969), footballer from Trinidad and Tobago
- Edson Elcock (born 1985), American soccer player of Trinidadian heritage
- Roland Elcock VC MM (1899–1944), English recipient of the Victoria Cross
- Steve Elcock (born 1957), Anglo-French composer
- Ward Elcock, Canadian civil servant who served as the Director of the Canadian Security Intelligence Service 1994–2004
- Wayne Elcock (born 1974), English boxer
