= Cecil Sewell =

Cecil Harold Sewell
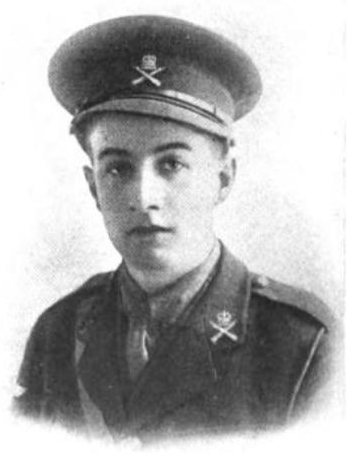
- Born: 27 January 1895; Greenwich, London, England
- Died: 29 August 1918 (aged 23); Fremicourt, France
- Burial place: Vaulx Hill Cemetery, Vaulx-Vraucourt
- Military career
- Allegiance: United Kingdom
- Branch: British Army
- Service years: –1918
- Rank: Lieutenant
- Units: Royal West Kent Regiment; Tank Corps
- Conflicts: World War I †
- Awards: Victoria Cross

Cecil Harold Sewell VC (27 January 1895 – 29 August 1918) was an English recipient of the Victoria Cross, the highest award for gallantry in the face of the enemy that can be awarded to British and Commonwealth forces.

== Biography ==
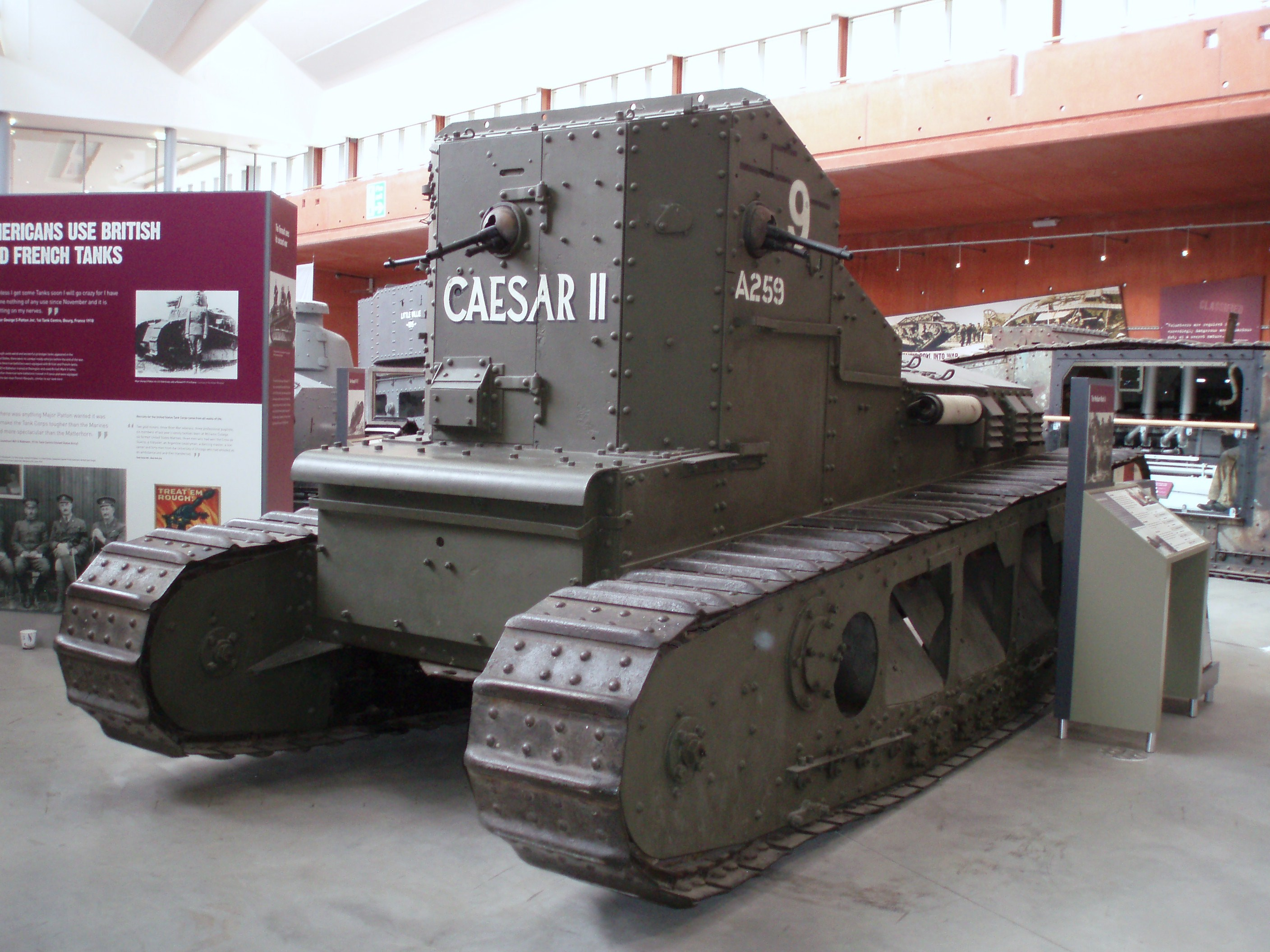
Sewell's tank, Whippet A259, Caesar II at The Tank Museum (2010)

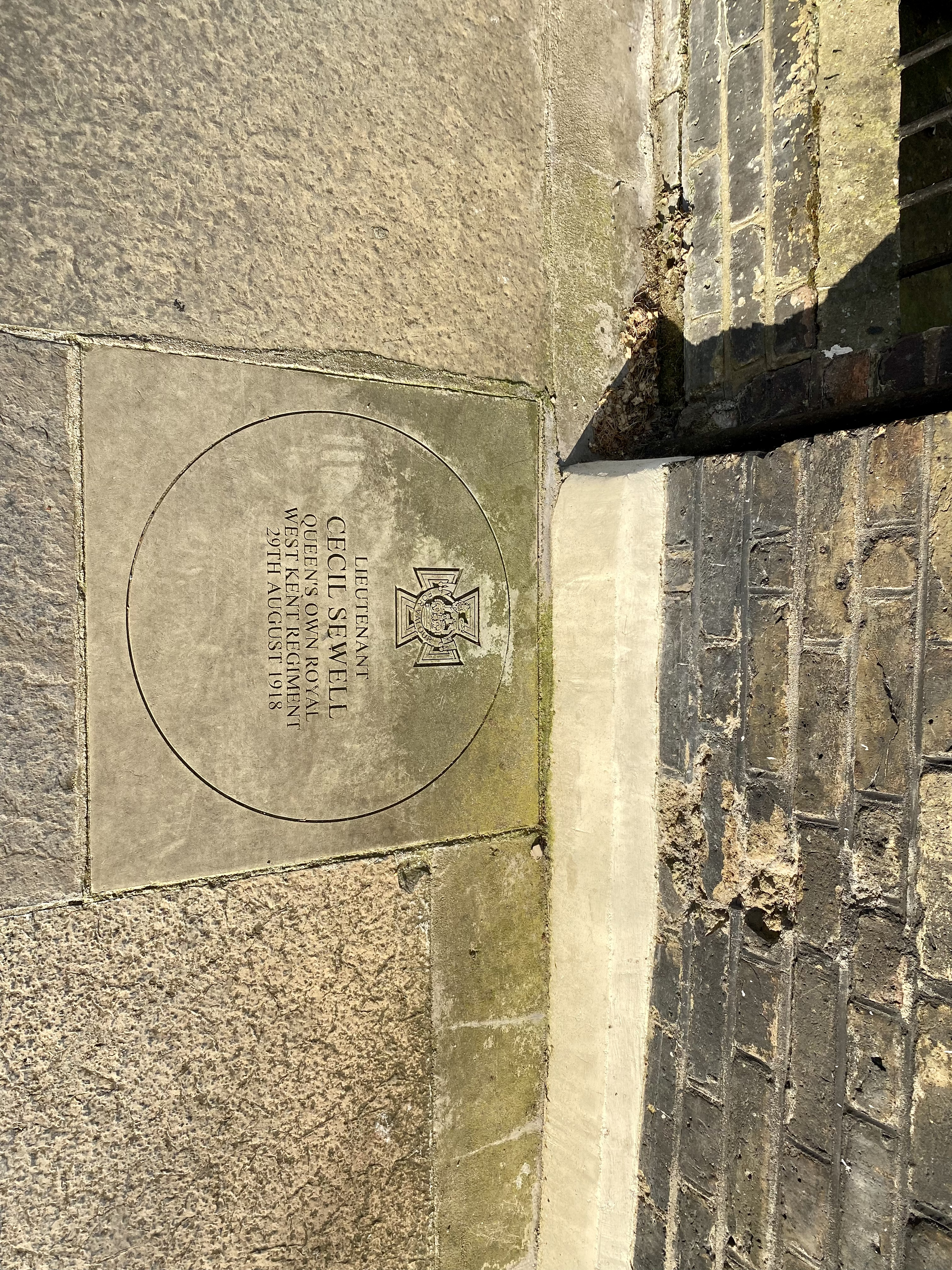
Plaque to Sewell at the corner of Crooms Hill and Gloucester Circus in Greenwich, London

One of nine children, he was educated at Dulwich College between 1907 and 1912. He was 23 years old, and a lieutenant in the Queen's Own Royal West Kent Regiment, British Army, attached to 3rd (Light) Battalion, Tank Corps during the First World War when the following deed took place for which he was awarded the VC.

On 29 August 1918 at Fremicourt, France, Lieutenant Sewell, who was in command of a section of Whippet Medium tanks, got out of his own tank and crossed open ground under heavy machine-gun fire to rescue the crew of another Whippet of his section which had side-slipped into a shell-hole, overturned and caught fire. The door of the tank had become jammed against the side of the shell-hole, but Lieutenant Sewell, unaided, dug away the entrance to the door and released the crew. Having done this, he saw one of his own crew lying wounded behind his tank. He crossed the open ground to go to his assistance. Although hit while doing so, he reached the tank. Only few minutes later he was hit, fatally this time, while dressing his wounded driver.

His Victoria Cross and his Whippet tank are displayed at The Tank Museum, Dorset, England.

Two of his brothers were also killed in action. His brother, Bert Sewell, a lieutenant in the Royal Artillery, was killed in November 1916. He has no known grave and is commemorated on the Thiepval memorial. His story was featured on the Channel 4 documentary The Last Heroes of the Somme.

== See also ==
- List of First World War Victoria Cross recipients

== Bibliography ==
- Gliddon, Gerald (2014) [2002]. Road to Victory 1918. VCs of the First World War. The History Press. ISBN 978-0750953610.
- Ingleton, Roy (2011). Kent VCs. Pen and Sword Books. ISBN 978-1848844094.
