= David Lowe MacIntyre =

David Lowe Macintyre VC CB
- Born: 18 June 1895; Portnahaven, Islay, Argyll
- Died: 31 July 1967 (aged 72); Edinburgh, Scotland
- Military career
- Allegiance: United Kingdom
- Branch: British Army
- Rank: Captain
- Units: Argyll and Sutherland Highlanders
- Conflicts: World War I
- Awards: Victoria Cross; Order of the Bath
- Other work: Under Secretary for Scotland, Ministry of Works

David Lowe Macintyre VC, CB (18 June 1895 – 31 July 1967) was a Scottish recipient of the Victoria Cross, the highest and most prestigious award for gallantry in the face of the enemy that can be awarded to British and Commonwealth forces.

== Details ==
After graduating from the University of Edinburgh, the 23 years old, and a temporary lieutenant in The Argyll and Sutherland Highlanders (Princess Louise's), British Army, was attached to 1/6th Battalion, The Highland Light Infantry during the First World War when the following deeds took place for which he was awarded the VC. On 24 August 1918, and three days later, on 27 August near Hénin and Fontaine-lès-Croisilles, France, Lieutenant Macintyre, when acting as adjutant of his battalion, was constantly in evidence in the firing line and by his coolness under most heavy shell and machine-gun fire inspired the confidence of all ranks. On one occasion when extra strong barbed wire entanglements were encountered, he organised and took forward a party and under heavy fire supervised the making of gaps. Subsequently, when relieved of command of the firing line and an enemy machine-gun opened fire close to him, he rushed it single-handed, putting the team to flight, and then brought in the gun. The full citation was published in a supplement to the London Gazette of 25 October 1918, and read:

War Office, 26th October, 1918.

His Majesty the KING has been graciously pleased to approve of the award of the Victoria Cross to the undermentioned Officer, Non-commissioned Officers and Man : —

T./Lt. David Lowe Macintyre, Arg. & Suth'd Highrs.

For most conspicuous bravery in attack when, acting as Adjutant of his battalion, he was constantly in evidence in the firing line, and by his coolness under most heavy shell and machine-gun fire inspired the confidence of all ranks.

Three days later he was in command of the firing line during an attack, and showed throughout most courageous and skilful leading in face of heavy machine-gun fire. When barbed wire was encountered, he personally reconnoitred it before leading his men forward. On one occasion, when extra strong entanglements were reached, he organised and took forward a party of men. and under heavy machine-gun fire supervised the making of gaps.

Later, when the greater part of our line was definitely held up, Lt. Macintyre rallied a small party, pushed forward through the enemy barrage in pursuit of an enemy machine-gun detachment, and ran them to earth in a "pill-box" a short distance ahead, killing three and capturing an officer, ten other ranks and five machine guns. In this redoubt he and his party raided three "pill-boxes" and disposed of the occupants, thus enabling the battalion to capture the redoubt.

When the battalion was ordered to take up a defensive position, Lt. Macintyre, after he had been relieved of command of the firing line, reconnoitred the right flank which was exposed. When doing this an enemy machine gun opened fire close to him. Without any hesitation he rushed it singlehanded, put the team to flight and brought in the gun. On returning to the redoubt he continued to show splendid spirit while supervising consolidation.

The success of the advance was largely due to Lt. Macintyre's fine leadership and initiative, and his gallantry and leading was an inspiring example to all.

After the war, he entered the Civil Service in the Office of Works and by the time of his appointment as a Companion of the Order of the Bath (CB) in the 1949 New Year Honours, he was Under Secretary for Scotland in its successor, the Ministry of Works. He still held the post at his retirement in 1959.

The medal is now on display in the National War Museum of Scotland, Edinburgh Castle.

== Bibliography ==
- Scotland's Forgotten Valour (Graham Ross, 1995)
- Gliddon, Gerald (2014) [2002]. Road to Victory 1918. VCs of the First World War. The History Press. ISBN 978-0750953610.
