= John William Sayer =

British soldier (1879–1918)

John William Sayer VC
- Sayer c. 1900
- Born: 12 April 1879; Islington, London
- Died: 18 April 1918 (aged 39); Le Verguier, France
- Burial place: Le Cateau Military Cemetery, France
- Military career
- Allegiance: United Kingdom
- Branch: British Army
- Service years: 1916−1918
- Rank: Lance corporal
- Service number: 14498
- Units: Queen's (Royal West Surrey Regiment)
- Conflicts: World War I
- Awards: Victoria Cross

Lance Corporal John William Sayer VC (12 April 1879 – 18 April 1918) was a British Army soldier and an English recipient of the Victoria Cross (VC), the highest and most prestigious award for gallantry in the face of the enemy that can be awarded to British and Commonwealth forces.

He was 38 years old, and a Lance Corporal in the 8th Battalion, The Queen's (Royal West Surrey Regiment), British Army during the First World War when the following deed took place for which he was awarded the VC.

On 21 March 1918 at Le Verguier, France, Lance Corporal Sayer held the flank of a small isolated post for two hours. Owing to mist the enemy approached from both sides to within 30 yards before being discovered, but the lance corporal, on his own initiative without assistance, beat off a succession of attacks, inflicting heavy losses. During the whole time he was exposed to heavy fire but his contempt of danger and skill in the use of his fire-arms enabled the post to hold out until nearly all the garrison had been killed and he himself wounded and captured. He died as a result of wounds four weeks later.

== Bibliography ==
- Gliddon, Gerald (2013) [2004]. Spring Offensive 1918. VCs of the First World War. The History Press. ISBN 978-0-7524-8730-4.
