= Arthur Henderson (VC) =

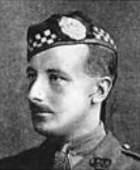
- Born: 6 May 1893; Paisley, Renfrewshire, Scotland
- Died: 24 April 1917 (aged 23); Fontaine-les-Croisilles, France
- Burial place: Cojeul British Cemetery, Saint-Martin-sur-Cojeul
- Military career
- Allegiance: United Kingdom
- Branch: British Army
- Service years: 1914–1917
- Rank: Captain
- Units: Argyll & Sutherland Highlanders
- Conflicts: World War I †
- Awards: Victoria Cross; Military Cross

Arthur Henderson VC, MC (6 May 1893 – 24 April 1917) was a Scottish recipient of the Victoria Cross, the highest and most prestigious award for gallantry in the face of the enemy that can be awarded to British and Commonwealth forces.

Henderson was born 6 May 1893 to Baillie George Henderson, a Magistrate of Paisley, and Elizabeth Purdie.

Aged 23, he was an acting Captain who was initially commissioned into the 3rd/6th Battalion, The Argyll and Sutherland Highlanders (Princess Louise's), British Army, on 5 April 1915. He then served in France with the 4th Battalion during the First World War and was attached to the 2nd Battalion. On 23 April 1917 near Fontaine-les-Croisilles, France, he performed the deed for which he was awarded the Victoria Cross. He died the following day.

== Citation ==
2nd Lieutenant (acting Captain) Arthur Henderson, M.C., late Argyll and Sutherland Highlanders.

For most conspicuous bravery.

During an attack on the enemy trenches this officer, although almost immediately wounded in the left arm, led his Company through the front enemy line until he gained his final objective.

He then proceeded to consolidate his position, which, owing to heavy gun and machine gun fire and bombing attacks, was in danger of being isolated.

By his cheerful courage and coolness he was enabled to maintain the spirit of his men under most trying conditions.

Captain Henderson was killed after he had successfully accomplished his task.

— London Gazette

== Further information ==
Buried at the Commonwealth War Graves Commission's Cojeul British Cemetery, Saint-Martin-sur-Cojeul, Pas-de-Calais, France.

His name appears on the war memorial in Gordon in the Scottish borders, showing the fact that he won the VC.

His VC is on display in the Lord Ashcroft Gallery at the Imperial War Museum, London.

== Bibliography ==
- Gliddon, Gerald (2012) [1998]. Arras and Messines 1917. VCs of the First World War. The History Press. ISBN 978-0-7524-6604-0.
