= Amey =

Amey may refer to:

- Amey (company), a UK infrastructure support company

== People ==
- Abdihakim Amey (born 1965), former vice president of Puntland
- Colin Amey, Canadian singer
- François Pierre Joseph Amey (1768–1850), French general
- Jessica Amey (born 1976), Canadian swimmer
- Otis Amey (born 1981), American footballer
- William Amey (1881–1940), English soldier and recipient of the Victoria Cross
- Wisdom Amey (born 2005), Italian footballer
