= Montague Shadworth Seymour Moore =

- Born: 9 October 1896; Worthing, Sussex, United Kingdom
- Died: 12 September 1966 (aged 69); Kiganjo, Kenya
- Military career
- Allegiance: United Kingdom
- Branch: British Army
- Rank: Major
- Units: Hampshire Regiment; King's African Rifles
- Conflicts: World War I Russian Civil War
- Awards: Victoria Cross; Croix de Guerre (France)

Montague Shadworth Seymour Moore VC (9 October 1896 – 12 September 1966) was an English recipient of the Victoria Cross, the highest and most prestigious award for gallantry in the face of the enemy that can be awarded to British and Commonwealth forces.

== Early life ==
Born at 13 Montague Place, Worthing, Moore attended Bedford School from 1906 to 1913.

== Details ==
He was 20 years old, and a Second Lieutenant in the 15th Bn., The Hampshire Regiment (later the Royal Hampshire Regiment), British Army during the First World War when the following deed took place for which he was awarded the VC.

On 20 September 1917 near Tower Hamlets, east of Ypres, Belgium, Second Lieutenant Moore volunteered to make a fresh attack on a final objective and went forward with some 70 men, but they met such heavy opposition that when he arrived at his objective he had only one sergeant and four men. Nothing daunted he at once bombed a large dug-out, taking 28 prisoners, two machine-guns and a light field-gun. Gradually more officers and men arrived, numbering about 60 and he held the post for 36 hours beating off counter-attacks, until his force was reduced to 10 men. He eventually got away his wounded and withdrew under cover of thick mist.

He later achieved the rank of Major.

Lance Corp G Kenton of the Hampshire Regiment received the following citation from Major General Sydney Lawford, comdg 41st Division: "I wish to place on record my appreciation of your gallantry and devotion to duty on the 20th September 1917 when you were held up by an Enemy Strong Point you collected up your men and led them with great dash to the attack and captured the enemy Strong Point."

The citation was given for his actions on 20 September 1917 near Tower Hamlets, east of Ypres, Belgium, when he went forward with some 70 men, but met such heavy opposition that when he arrived at his objective only five men were left standing. Nothing daunted he led his men with great dash and captured the enemy strong point: a large dug-out, taking 28 prisoners, two machine-guns and a light field-gun. Gradually more officers and men arrived, numbering about 60 they held the post for 36 hours beating off counter-attacks, until the force was reduced to 10 men. They eventually got away with their wounded and withdrew under cover of thick mist. Sadly, Lance Corp G. Kenton didn't receive a VC for his actions, as a working class lad of lowly rank he received a citation that his son kept in a tin beneath his bed – a cherished possession.

== Bibliography ==
- Monuments to Courage (David Harvey, 1999)
- The Register of the Victoria Cross (This England, 1997)
- VCs of the First World War: Passchendaele 1917 (Stephen Snelling, 1998)
