= Herbert James =

English recipient of the Victoria Cross

Herbert James VC, MC
- Born: 31 October 1887; Ladywood, Birmingham
- Died: 15 August 1958 (aged 69); Kensington, London
- Burial place: West London Crematorium, Kensal Green Cemetery, London
- Military career
- Allegiance: United Kingdom
- Branch: British Army
- Service years: 1909–1930
- Rank: Major
- Units: 21st Lancers; Worcestershire Regiment; East Lancashire Regiment; York and Lancaster Regiment
- Conflicts: World War I
- Awards: Victoria Cross; Military Cross; Mentioned in Despatches; Medal of La Solidaridad (Panama); Croix de Guerre (France)

Major Herbert James VC MC (31 October 1887 – 15 August 1958) was an English recipient of the Victoria Cross, the highest and most prestigious award for gallantry in the face of the enemy that can be awarded to British and Commonwealth forces.

Herbert James was born at 11 Ingleby Street in Ladywood, Birmingham. He was the son of Walter James and Emily James (née Danford). By the 1891 Census his family were living at 76 Three Shires Oak Road in Bearwood, Smethwick. He attended Bearwood Road Infants School and later went on to become a teacher there, and subsequently at Brasshouse Lane School.

James was 26 years old and a second lieutenant in the 4th Battalion, The Worcestershire Regiment, British Army during the First World War when the following deed took place for which he was awarded the VC.

On 28 June 1915 in the southern zone of Gallipoli, when the advance of part of the regiment had been checked, Second-Lieutenant James, from a neighbouring unit, gathered together a body of men and led them forward under heavy fire. He then returned, organised a second party and again advanced, putting fresh life into the attack. On 3 July he headed a party of bomb throwers up a Turkish communication trench and when all his party had been killed or wounded, he remained alone, under murderous fire and kept back the enemy until a barrier had been built behind him and the trench secured.

James returned home, after his award of the VC and received Civic receptions in both Birmingham and Smethwick. His family address, as of his visit in November 1915, was 141 Poplar Avenue in Edgbaston, Birmingham.

He later achieved the rank of major. His medals are on display at the Maryborough Military and Colonial Museum in Maryborough, Queensland, Australia.

Two memorials to James were unveiled in 2010. on 2 July a memorial stone was unveiled at the East Chapel in Kensal Green Cemetery, where he was cremated. On 12 November a plaque was unveiled at Bearwood Road School. This was presented to the school by Smethwick Heritage Centre.

== Bibliography ==
- Snelling, Stephen (2012) [1995]. Gallipoli. VCs of the First World War. The History Press. ISBN 978-0752456539.
