= William McNally =

English recipient of the Victoria Cross (1894–1976)

William McNally VC MM
- Born: 16 December 1894; Murton, County Durham, England
- Died: 1 May 1976 (aged 81); Murton, County Durham, England
- Military career
- Allegiance: United Kingdom
- Branch: British Army
- Service years: 1914 - 1919
- Rank: Sergeant
- Service number: 13820
- Units: Green Howards
- Conflicts: World War I
- Awards: Victoria Cross; Military Medal & bar

Sergeant William McNally VC, MM and Bar (16 December 1894 – 5 January 1976) was a British Army soldier and an English recipient of the Victoria Cross (VC), the highest and most prestigious award for gallantry in the face of the enemy that can be awarded to British and Commonwealth forces.

== Details ==
James Hall and William McNally.

He was 23 years old, and a sergeant in the 8th (S) Battalion, The Yorkshire Regiment (Alexandra, Princess of Wales's Own), British Army during the First World War when the following deed took place for which he was awarded the VC.

On 27 October 1918 at Piave River, Italy, when his company was most seriously hindered by machine-gun fire, Sergeant McNally, regardless of personal safety, rushed the machine-gun post single-handed, killing the team and capturing the gun. Later, at Vazzola on 29 October the sergeant crept up to the rear of an enemy post, put the garrison to flight and captured the machine-gun. On the same day, when holding a newly captured ditch, he was strongly counter-attacked from both flanks, but coolly controlling the fire of his party, he frustrated that attack, inflicting heavy casualties on the enemy.

His VC is displayed at the Imperial War Museum, London, in the Ashcroft Gallery. His replica medals and personal story are held at the Green Howards Museum, Richmond, North Yorkshire, alongside the medals of a fellow resident of Murton, James Hall DCM MM.

== Bibliography ==
- Ashcroft, Michael (2007) [2006]. Victoria Cross Heroes. London: Headline Review. ISBN 978-0-7553-1633-5.
- Buzzell, Nora, ed. (1997). The Register of the Victoria Cross. Cheltenham, Gloucestershire: This England Alma House. ISBN 0-906324-27-0.
- Gliddon, Gerald (2005). The Sideshows. VCs of the First World War. Gloucestershire: Sutton Publishing. ISBN 978-0-7509-2084-1.
