= Thomas Kenny (VC) =

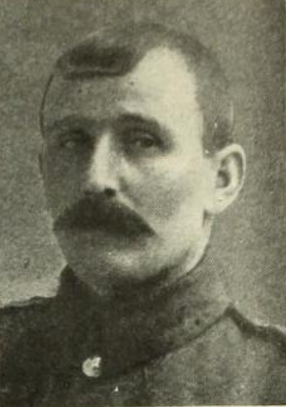
- Born: 4 April 1882; South Wingate, County Durham
- Died: 29 November 1948 (aged 66); South Wingate
- Burial place: Wheatley Hill Cemetery
- Military career
- Allegiance: United Kingdom
- Branch: British Army
- Service years: 1914–1918 17424
- Rank: Lance Sergeant
- Service number: 17424
- Units: Durham Light Infantry
- Conflicts: World War I
- Awards: Victoria Cross
- Other work: Coal miner

Lance Sergeant Thomas Kenny VC (4 April 1882 − 29 November 1948) was a British Army soldier and an English recipient of the Victoria Cross (VC), the highest award for gallantry in the face of the enemy given to British and Commonwealth forces.

On 4 November 1915 near La Houssoie, France, 33-year-old Kenny performed an act of bravery for which he was awarded the Victoria Cross.

== Biography ==
He was a private in the 13th Battalion, The Durham Light Infantry, British Army during the First World War when the following deed took place for which he was awarded the VC.

In thick mist, an officer in charge of a patrol was shot through both thighs. Private Kenny, although repeatedly fired on by the enemy, crawled about for more than an hour with his wounded officer on his back, trying to find his way through the fog to the British trenches. He refused to leave the officer although told several times to do so, and at last, utterly exhausted, left him in a comparatively safe ditch and went for help. He found a rescue party and guided them to the wounded officer who was then brought to safety.

The officer Lt. Philip Brown later died of his wounds.

== Bibliography ==
- Batchelor, Peter; Matson, Christopher (2011). The Western Front 1915. VCs of the First World War. The History Press. ISBN 978-0-7524-6057-4.
- Oldfield, Paul (2015). Victoria Crosses on the Western Front, April 1915–June 1916. Pen and Sword Books. ISBN 978-1783030439.
- Whitworth, Alan (2015). VCs of the North: Cumbria, Durham & Northumberland. Pen and Sword Books. ISBN 978-1473848221.
