= Tom Dresser =

Recipient of the Victoria Cross

Tom Dresser VC
- Born: 1891; Laund House Farm, Huby, Yorkshire
- Died: 9 April 1982 (aged 90–91); Middlesbrough
- Burial place: Thorntree Cemetery, Thorntree, Middlesbrough
- Military career
- Allegiance: United Kingdom
- Branch: British Army
- Rank: Private
- Units: Green Howards; Machine Gun Corps; Home Guard
- Conflicts: World War I World War II
- Awards: Victoria Cross

Tom Dresser VC (1891 – 9 April 1982) was an English recipient of the Victoria Cross, the highest and most prestigious award for gallantry in the face of the enemy that can be awarded to British and Commonwealth forces.

Dresser was born at Laund House Farm, Huby in 1891. He was 25 years old, and a private in the 7th Battalion, The Yorkshire Regiment (Alexandra, Princess of Wales's Own), British Army during the First World War when the following deed took place for which he was awarded the VC.

On 12 May 1917 near Roeux, France, Private Dresser, in spite of having been twice wounded on the way and suffering great pain, succeeded in conveying an important message from battalion headquarters to the front line trenches, which he eventually reached in an exhausted condition. His fearlessness and determination to deliver this message at all costs proved of the greatest value to his battalion at a critical period.

His Victoria Cross is displayed at the Green Howards Museum in Richmond, North Yorkshire.

== Bibliography ==
- Gliddon, Gerald (2012) [1998]. Arras and Messines 1917. VCs of the First World War. The History Press. ISBN 978-0-7524-6604-0.
