= Maurice Buckley =

Australian soldier

Maurice Vincent Buckley VC DCM
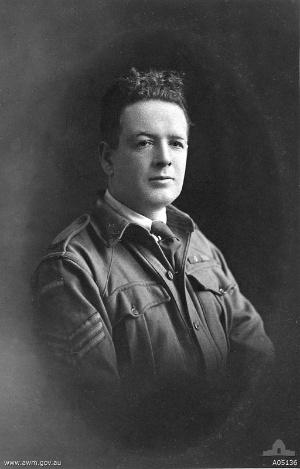
- Studio portrait of M. V. Buckley
- Born: 13 April 1891; Melbourne, Victoria
- Died: 27 January 1921 (aged 29); Melbourne, Victoria
- Burial place: Brighton Cemetery, Melbourne
- Military career
- Allegiance: Australia
- Branch: Australian Imperial Force
- Service years: 1914–19
- Rank: Sergeant
- Units: 13th Battalion
- Conflicts: First World War; Western Front; Battle of St Quentin Canal
- Awards: Victoria Cross; Distinguished Conduct Medal

Maurice Vincent Buckley, VC, DCM (13 April 1891 – 27 January 1921) was an Australian soldier serving under the pseudonym Gerald Sexton who was awarded the Victoria Cross during the First World War. This is the highest award for gallantry in the face of the enemy that can be awarded to British and Commonwealth forces.

== Life ==
Buckley was born at Upper Hawthorn, Melbourne, to Timothy Buckley, brickmaker, and his wife Agnes, née Sexton. His father was a native of Cork, Ireland; his mother was Victorian-born. Maurice Buckley was educated at the Christian Brothers' School in Abbotsford. He joined the 13th Light Horse Regiment on 18 December 1914 shortly after the outbreak of the First World War at Warrnambool, Victoria. In July 1915, he arrived in Egypt with reinforcements for his regiment, but in Cairo contracted the venereal disease chancroid. The following month he was sent back to Australia with 274 other VD-infected men on the Australian troopship HMAT A18 Wiltshire, and in late September 1915 was admitted to an Australian army medical isolation-detention barracks at Langwarrin, near Melbourne, that had been established earlier in 1915 to receive and treat VD-infected soldiers from Egypt. In January 1916 he escaped from Langwarrin, and was declared a deserter on 20 March.

On 6 May 1916 he enlisted again, this time in Sydney, using the name 'Gerald Sexton' – comprising his recently deceased younger brother's first name and his mother's maiden surname. He was sent to France in early 1917, where he fought on the Western Front. Following the award of the Distinguished Conduct Medal he was promoted to sergeant in August 1918 and involved in the advance on the Hindenburg Line.

He was awarded the Victoria Cross in the name 'Gerald Sexton' for his actions on 18 September 1918, at Le Verguier near Saint-Quentin. His unit was advancing under cover of a creeping barrage but was held up by German machine gun posts. Buckley attacked them with his Lewis gun section and captured 30 German prisoners of war. When the advance was again held up by machine-gun fire, Sergeant Buckley, supported by another platoon, put the enemy guns out of action. Later, he again showed conspicuous initiative in capturing hostile posts and machine-guns. According to the citation, he was "to the fore dealing with enemy machine-guns, rushing enemy posts, and performing great feats of bravery and endurance without faltering or for a moment taking cover".

The award of the VC was originally gazetted under the name 'Gerald Sexton', but he had disclosed his real identity by the time that it was presented to him by King George V at a ceremony at Buckingham Palace on 29 May 1919. and was discharged in December 1919.

== Death ==
He was severely injured in a riding accident at Boolarra, Gippsland on 15 January 1921, and died on 27 January, aged 29. Ten Victoria Cross recipients were pallbearers at his funeral. He is buried at Brighton Cemetery in Melbourne. He was unmarried.

== Medals ==
His Victoria Cross is displayed at the Australian War Memorial in Canberra, Australia. Medals: Victoria Cross, Distinguished Conduct Medal, 1914–15 Star, British War Medal, Victory Medal
