= Arthur Forbes Gordon Kilby =

Recipient of the Victoria Cross (1885–1915)

- Born: 3 February 1885; Cheltenham, Gloucestershire
- Died: 25 September 1915 (aged 30) near Cuinchy, France
- Burial place: Arras Road Cemetery, Roclincourt
- Military career
- Allegiance: United Kingdom
- Branch: British Army
- Service years: 1905 - 1915
- Rank: Captain
- Units: The South Staffordshire Regiment
- Conflicts: World War I: Western Front; Battle of Loos (MIA)
- Awards: Victoria Cross; Military Cross

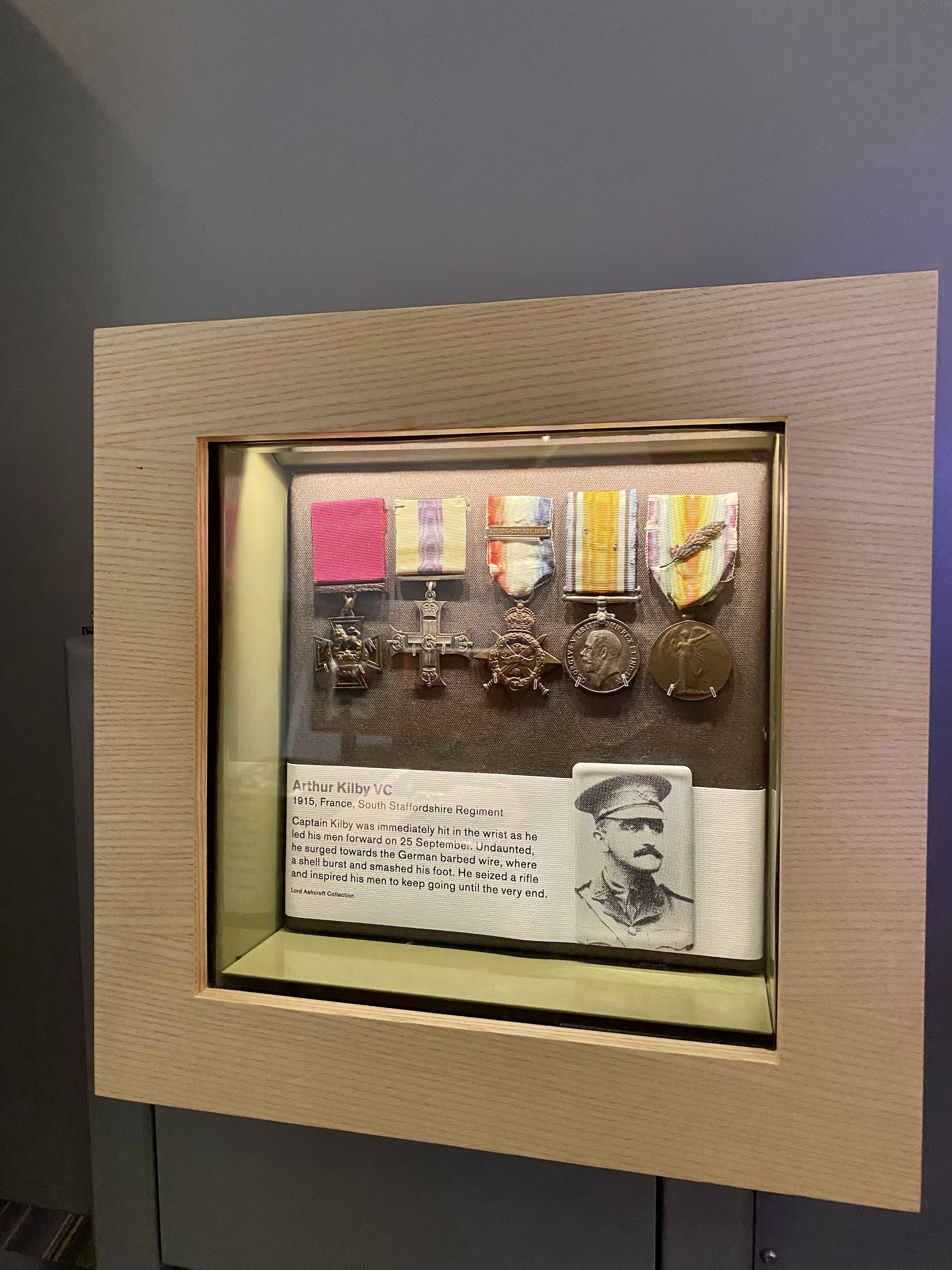
Kilby's Victoria Cross and medal group at the Imperial War Museum, London, in 2023

Arthur Forbes Gordon Kilby VC MC (3 February 1885 – 25 September 1915) was an English officer in the British Army during the First World War, and recipient of the Victoria Cross.

== Early life ==
Forbes was born on 3 February 1885 in East Hayes, Cheltenham, the only son of Sandford and Alice F. Kilby, He was educated at Bilton Grange near Rugby and Winchester College. He graduated from the Royal Military College, Sandhurst in July 1905, and was commissioned into the South Staffordshire Regiment.

== Military career ==
Kilby was promoted to Captain on 1 April 1910 when he was only 25. An accomplished linguist, he was fluent in Hungarian and German, and when war broke out in August 1914 he was learning Spanish. He was posted to the British Expeditionary Force in France and Flanders with the 2nd Battalion, The South Staffordshire Regiment during the First World War.

Kilby was 30 years old, and a captain when he performed an act for which he was awarded the VC and during which he died. He was killed in action on 25 September 1915 whilst leading his company attacking enemy positions near Cuinchy, on the Le Bassee Canal, on the first day of the Battle of Loos. Kilby's extreme heroism and gallantry during this attack was noted and he was awarded a posthumous Victoria Cross on 30 March 1916.

=== Citation ===
For most conspicuous bravery. Captain Kilby was specially selected at his own request, and on account of the gallantry which he had previously displayed on many occasions, to attack with his Company a strong enemy redoubt. The Company charged along the narrow towpath, headed by Captain Kilby, who, though wounded at the outset, continued to lead his men right up to the enemy wire under a devastating machine gun fire and a shower of bombs. Here he was shot down, but, although his foot had been blown off, he continued to cheer on his men and to use a rifle. Captain Kilby has been missing since the date of the performance of this great act of valour, and his death has now to be presumed.

— London Gazette, dated 30 March 1916

== Legacy ==
Kilby's heroism was acknowledged by the German defenders who erected a memorial cross at the location of his death. His body was eventually found on 19 February 1929 and interred at Arras Road Cemetery, Roclincourt, Plot III, Row N, Grave 27.

In 1919 a memorial was placed in St Nicholas's Chapel, York Minster; which was inscribed with details of Arthur Kilby's deeds and awards, and contained a bust of him surmounted by the family coat-of-arms. His name is also listed on a war memorial in St Cuthbert's Church, Peasholme Green, York.

In 2012, Kilby's Victoria Cross, along with another awarded to Private Sidney Godley, the very first VC recipient of World War I, was sold at a London auction for £276,000 each to Lord Ashcroft. Captain Kilby's medal are now part of the Lord Ashcroft Medal Collection in the Imperial War Museum in London.

== Bibliography ==
- Batchelor, Peter; Matson, Christopher (2011). The Western Front 1915. VCs of the First World War. The History Press. ISBN 978-0-7524-6057-4.
