= Frederick Booth =

Captain Frederick Booth VC DCM
- Born: 6 March 1890; Holloway, London
- Died: 14 September 1960 (aged 70); Brighton, Sussex
- Burial place: Bear Road Cemetery, Brighton
- Military career
- Allegiance: Southern Rhodesia; United Kingdom
- Branch: British Army
- Service years: 1912–1939
- Rank: Captain
- Units: British South Africa Police; Rhodesia Native Regiment (attached); Middlesex Regiment; Auxiliary Military Pioneer Corps
- Conflicts: World War I World War II
- Awards: Victoria Cross; Distinguished Conduct Medal

Captain Frederick Charles Booth VC, DCM (6 March 1890 – 14 September 1960) was a Rhodesian recipient of the Victoria Cross, the highest and most prestigious award for gallantry in the face of the enemy that can be awarded to British and Commonwealth forces.

== Details ==
Booth was born in Holloway, North London, and educated at Cheltenham College. He served in the British South Africa Police in Southern Rhodesia from 1912 to 1917 and his regimental number was 1630. He was 26 years old, and a sergeant in the British South Africa Police attached to the Rhodesian Native Regiment during the First World War, when the following deed took place for which he was awarded the VC.

On 12 February 1917 in Johannes Bruck, German East Africa (now Tanzania), during an attack in thick scrub on an enemy position, Sergeant Booth went forward alone to rescue an injured man. He then rallied the poorly organised native troops and brought them to the firing line.

In 1918 he was commissioned into the Middlesex Regiment and in June 1919 he resigned his commission.

In 1939 he served with the Auxiliary Military Pioneer Corps.

Booth died on 14 September 1960 in Brighton, Sussex, England. He is buried at Bear Road Cemetery, Brighton, in the Red Cross Plot.

== Bibliography ==
- Gliddon, Gerald (2005). The Sideshows. VCs of the First World War. Gloucestershire, England: Sutton Publishing. ISBN 978-0-7509-2084-1.
