= David Lauder =

David Ross Lauder
- Born: 31 January 1894; Airdrie, Lanarkshire, Scotland
- Died: 4 June 1972 (aged 78); Glasgow, Lanarkshire, Scotland
- Military career
- Allegiance: United Kingdom
- Branch: British Army
- Rank: Private
- Units: Royal Scots Fusiliers
- Conflicts: World War I
- Awards: Victoria Cross; Medal for Bravery (Serbia)

David Ross Lauder VC (31 January 1894 – 4 June 1972) was a Scottish recipient of the Victoria Cross, the highest and most prestigious award for gallantry in the face of the enemy that can be awarded to British and Commonwealth forces.

== Details ==
Lauder was 21 years old, and a private in the 1/4th Battalion, The Royal Scots Fusiliers, British Army during the First World War when the following deed took place for which he was awarded the VC.

On 13 August 1915 at Cape Helles, Gallipoli, Turkey, Private Lauder was with a bombing party retaking a sap when he threw a bomb which failed to clear the parapet and fell amongst the bombing party. There was no time to smother the bomb and Private Lauder at once put his foot on it, thereby localizing the explosion. His foot was blown off, but the remainder of the party escaped unhurt.

== Bibliography ==
- Snelling, Stephen (2012) [1995]. Gallipoli. VCs of the First World War. The History Press. ISBN 978-0752456539.
