= Frederick William Dobson =

English Victoria Cross recipient (1886–1935)

Frederick William Dobson VC
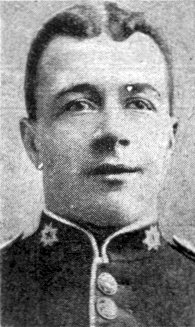
- Born: 9 November 1886; Ovingham, Northumberland
- Died: 15 November 1935 (aged 49); Newcastle-upon-Tyne
- Burial place: Ryton & Crawcrook Cemetery
- Military career
- Allegiance: United Kingdom
- Branch: British Army
- Rank: Lance-Corporal
- Units: Coldstream Guards
- Conflicts: World War I
- Awards: Victoria Cross

Frederick William Dobson, VC (9 November 1886 – 15 November 1935) was an English recipient of the Victoria Cross, the highest and most prestigious award for gallantry in the face of the enemy that can be awarded to British and Commonwealth forces.

Dobson was 27 years old, and a private in the 2nd Battalion, Coldstream Guards, British Army during the First World War when the following deed at the First Battle of the Aisne took place for which he was awarded the VC.

On 28 September 1914 at Chavonne, Aisne, France, Private Dobson twice volunteered to go out under heavy fire to bring in two wounded men. This undertaking involved crossing a good deal of open ground in full view of the enemy. Private Dobson, however, crawled out and found one of the men dead and the other wounded. He dressed the wounds and then crawled back, to return with a corporal and a stretcher, on to which they put the wounded man and then dragged him back to safety.

He later achieved the rank of lance-corporal. His Victoria Cross is displayed at The Guards Regimental Headquarters (Coldstream Guards RHQ), Wellington Barracks in London.

== VC Commemoration ==
As part of the United Kingdom national commemoration of the First World War memorial stones of VC recipients of that war were laid in their birthplaces. Dobson was born in Ovingham, Northumberland on 19 November 1886. Northumberland County Council organised a church service to unveil the VC Memorial Stone to Frederick Dobson VC on 27 September 2014.

A memorial to Frederick William Dobson another VC recipient from High Spen, Sergeant Thomas Young, and was unveiled in July 2007 and can be seen in the grounds of High Spen primary school.

== Bibliography ==
- Gliddon, Gerald (2011) [1994]. 1914. VCs of the First World War. The History Press. ISBN 978-0752459080.
