= Charles Jarvis (VC) =

Scottish Victoria Cross recipient (1881–1948)

Charles Jarvis VC
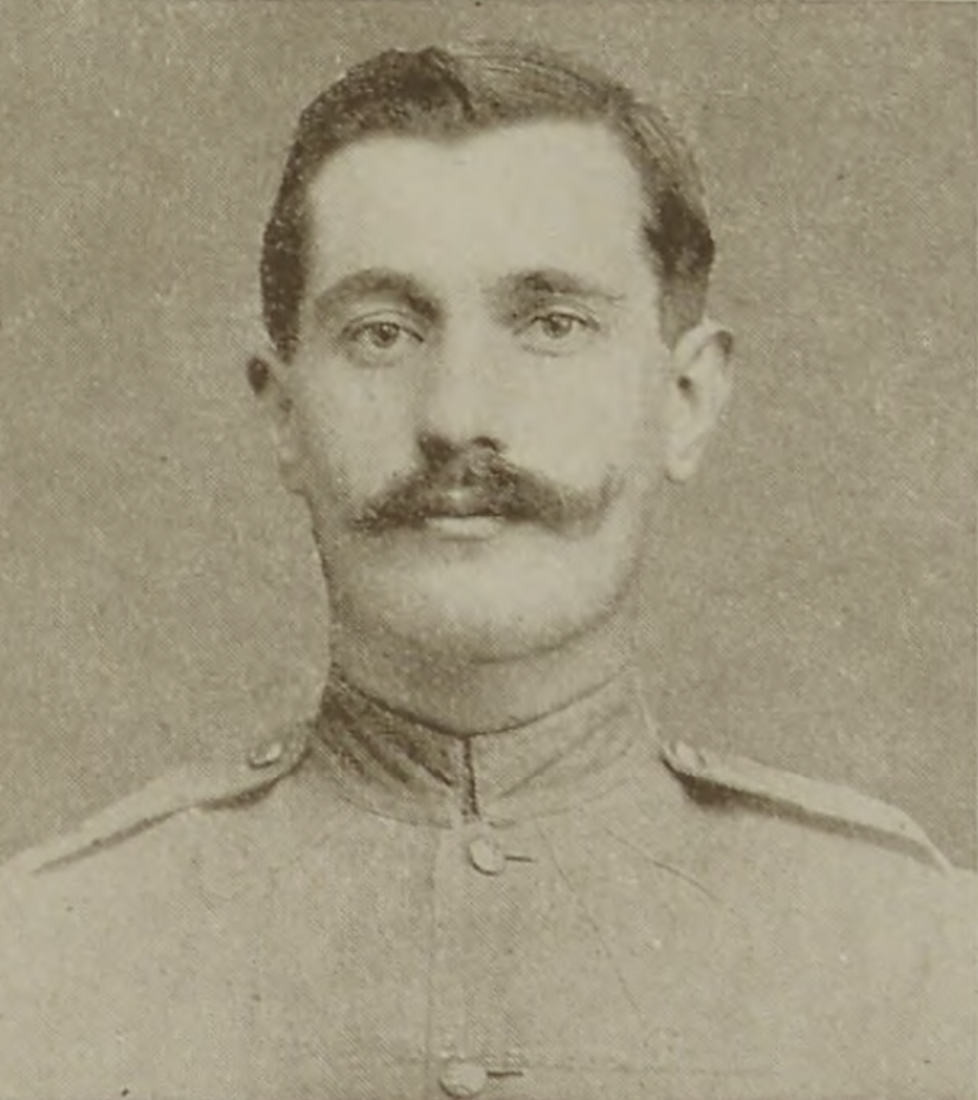
- Born: 29 March 1881; Fraserburgh, Aberdeenshire
- Died: 19 November 1948 (aged 67); Dundee, Scotland
- Burial place: Cupar Cemetery, Fife
- Military career
- Allegiance: United Kingdom
- Branch: British Army
- Service years: 1899–1907, 1914–1917
- Rank: Corporal
- Units: Royal Engineers
- Conflicts: World War I
- Awards: Victoria Cross

Charles Alfred Jarvis VC (29 March 1881 – 19 November 1948) was a Scottish recipient of the Victoria Cross, the highest and most prestigious award for gallantry in the face of the enemy that can be awarded to British and Commonwealth forces.

Jarvis was born in the Admiralty Buildings, Saltoun Place, Fraserburgh, Aberdeenshire, on 29 March 1881. His father was a coastguard and also called Charles Alfred Jarvis. He lived most of his early life in Carnoustie, Angus, where there is now a memorial to him. He was also honoured by Fraserburgh in 2014. He joined the Royal Engineers in 1899 and travelled with his unit to Singapore. He was transferred to the reserve in 1907. In civilian life, Jarvis was a metalworker and a member of the Walthamstow Branch of the Amalgamated Society of Engineers.

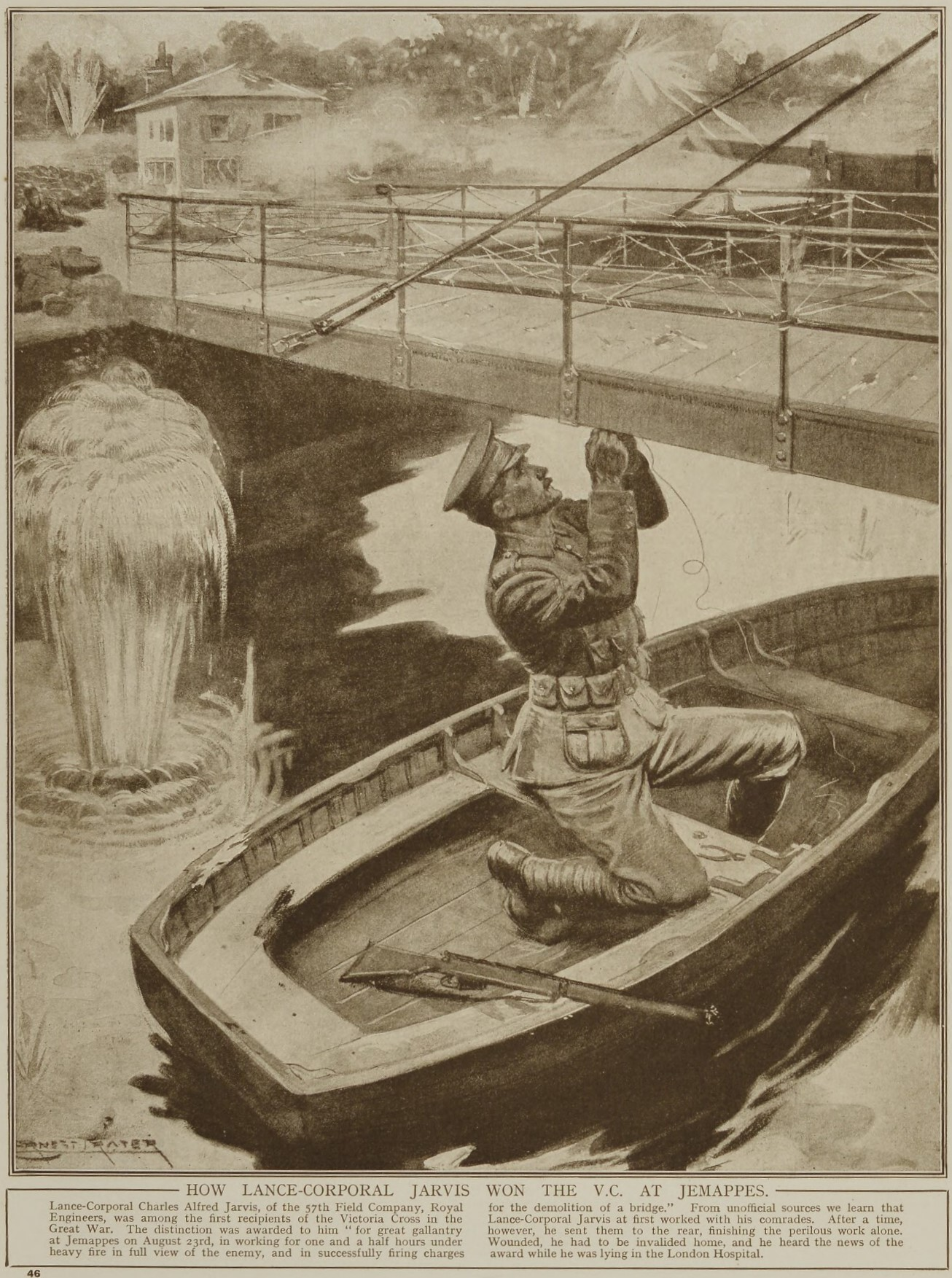
How Lance-Corporal Jarvis won the V.C. at Jemappes (illustration by Ernest Prater)

At the outbreak of World War I he was recalled to service. He was 33 years old, and a lance-corporal in the 57th Field Company, Royal Engineers, British Army during the First World War when the following deed took place for which he was awarded the VC.

Only three weeks into the war on 23 August 1914 at Jemappes, Belgium, Lance-Corporal Jarvis worked for 1½ hours under heavy fire, in full view of the enemy and finally succeeded in firing charges for the demolition of a bridge. He was wounded in the process. Private Samuel Heron of the first battalion Royal Scots Fusiliers was also awarded a DCM for his part in this action.

In 1915 he returned to Britain and was presented with his medal at Buckingham Palace. He was later promoted to second corporal and corporal before being discharged from the Army in 1917. He went on to work at the Naval Dockyard at Portsmouth. He returned to Dundee in 1941.

== Early life ==
Soon after he was born, his father was transferred to Rattray Head Coastguard Station where the family stayed for eight years while Charles went to Crimond School. The family then moved to North Berwick where his father received the Royal Humane Society medal for bravery for rescuing two boys. His father was then transferred to Carnoustie where Charles completed his education in Carnoustie School.

== Working life ==
After leaving school he was an apprentice plumber but was unable to complete due to the death of his mother and sister within a month and two years later his father died.

== Bibliography ==
- Napier, Gerald (1998). The Sapper VCs: The Story of Valour in the Royal Engineers and Its Associated Corps. The Stationery Office. ISBN 978-0117728356.
- Scotland's Forgotten Valour (Graham Ross, 1995)
- Gliddon, Gerald (2011) [1994]. 1914. VCs of the First World War. The History Press. ISBN 978-0752459080.
