= James Huffam =

Scottish recipient of the Victoria Cross (1897–1968)

James Palmer Huffam
- Born: 31 March 1897; Dunblane, Scotland
- Died: 16 February 1968 (aged 70); Burnt Oak, Middlesex, England
- Military career
- Allegiance: United Kingdom
- Branch: British Army
- Rank: Major
- Units: Duke of Wellington's Regiment
- Conflicts: World War I World War II
- Awards: Victoria Cross

Major James Palmer Huffam VC (31 March 1897 – 16 February 1968) was a Scottish recipient of the Victoria Cross, the highest and most prestigious award for gallantry in the face of the enemy that can be awarded to British and Commonwealth forces.

== Early years ==
He was born in Dunblane on 31 March 1897. He was the fourth son of Edward Valentine Huffam, an Army Pensioner (Royal Highlanders) and High Bailiff, and Dorothy Roughead Huffam, of 2 West Street, Spittal, Berwick-on-Tweed. His siblings were Alfred Meek, John Henry, Elizabeth Clara Margery, Dorothy Francis, Henry Harold and Dorothy Gertrude Beatrice. Huffam was educated at Spittal Council School.

== First World War ==
He was 21 years old, and a second lieutenant in the 5th Battalion, The Duke of Wellington's (West Riding) Regiment, British Army, attd, 2nd Battalion during the First World War. On 31 August 1918 at St. Servin's Farm, France, Huffam with three men rushed an enemy machine-gun post and put it out of action. His position was then heavily attacked and he withdrew, carrying back a wounded comrade. Again in the night, accompanied by two men only, he rushed an enemy machine-gun, capturing eight prisoners and enabling the advance to continue. He was awarded the Victoria Cross for his actions; his medal is privately owned and not on display.

== Post-war and Second World War ==
After the war, James Palmer Huffam remained in the army. He was initiated as a Freemason at St David's Lodge No 393 Berwick on Tweed on 17 Feb 1920, age 22. On 23 April 1935, he married Constance Marion Huffam at Valletta, Malta and they had two children. He was for a time seconded to the Royal Air Force as a flying officer, He undertook service in India and West Africa. He eventually rose to the rank of major and retired in 1938 for the first time.

During the Second World War he went back into the service and was the Assistant Provost Marshal for France, and was involved in the Normandy landings. He achieved the rank of major. He retired for the second time in 1945 and died in 1968 at Burnt Oak in Middlesex, on 16 February 1968.

== Bibliography ==
- Gliddon, Gerald (2014) [2002]. Road to Victory 1918. VCs of the First World War. The History Press. ISBN 978-0750953610.
