= Roland Elcock =

English recipient of the Victoria Cross (1899–1944)

Roland Edward Elcock
- Born: 5 June 1899; Wolverhampton, England
- Died: 6 October 1944 (aged 45); Dehra Dun, British India
- Burial place: St Thomas's Churchyard, Dehra Dun
- Military career
- Allegiance: United Kingdom
- Branch: British Army; British Indian Army
- Rank: Major
- Units: The Royal Scots
- Conflicts: World War I World War II
- Awards: Victoria Cross; Military Medal

Major Roland Edward Elcock VC MM (5 June 1899 – 6 October 1944) was an English recipient of the Victoria Cross, the highest and most prestigious award for gallantry in the face of the enemy that can be awarded to British and Commonwealth forces.

Elcock was born on 5 June 1899. He initially enlisted in the British Army in October 1914 when he was 15. Being underage for army service, he was discharged when his real age was discovered. He worked as a clerk in Wolverhampton before re-enlisting at the age of 18.

He was 19 years old, and an acting corporal in the 11th Battalion, The Royal Scots (The Lothian Regiment), British Army during the First World War, and was awarded the VC for his actions on 15 October 1918 south-east of Capelle St. Catherine, Belgium.

Corporal Elcock was in charge of a Lewis gun team, and entirely on his own initiative he rushed his gun up to within 10 yards of enemy guns which were causing heavy casualties and holding up the advance. He put both guns out of action, capturing five prisoners and undoubtedly saved the whole attack from being held up. Later, near the River Lys, this NCO again attacked an enemy machine-gun and captured the crew.

He later achieved the rank of major after enlisting in the British Indian Army during World War II. He died in October 1944.

His Victoria Cross is displayed at the Royal Scots Museum, Edinburgh Castle, Scotland.

== Bibliography ==
- Buzzell, Nora, ed. (1997). The Register of the Victoria Cross. Cheltenham, Gloucestershire: This England Alma House. ISBN 0-906324-27-0.
- Gliddon, Gerald (2014) [2000]. The Final Days 1918. VCs of the First World War. Stroud, Gloucestershire: History Press. ISBN 978-0-7509-5368-9.
- Harvey, David (2000). Monuments to Courage. Naval & Military Press Ltd. ISBN 1-84342-356-1.
