= William Amey =

Recipient of the Victoria Cross

- Born: 5 March 1881; Birmingham, England
- Died: 28 May 1940 (aged 59); Leamington Spa, Warwickshire, England
- Burial place: Leamington Cemetery, Brunswick Street, Leamington Spa
- Military career
- Allegiance: United Kingdom
- Branch: British Army
- Rank: Corporal
- Units: The Warwickshire Regiment
- Conflicts: World War I: Western Front; Hundred Days Offensive
- Awards: Victoria Cross; Military Medal

Hall of Memory Centenary Square

William Amey (5 March 1881 – 28 May 1940) was an English recipient of the Victoria Cross, the highest and most prestigious award for gallantry in the face of the enemy that can be awarded to British and Commonwealth forces.

Amey was 37 years old, and a lance-corporal in the 1/8th Battalion, The Royal Warwickshire Regiment, British Army during the First World War when the following deed took place for which he was awarded the VC.

On 4 November 1918 at Landrecies, France, when many hostile machine-gun nests were missed by the leading troops owing to fog, Lance-Corporal Amey led his section against a machine-gun nest under heavy fire and drove the garrison into a neighbouring farm, finally capturing 50 prisoners and several machine-guns. Later, single-handed and under heavy fire he attacked a machine-gun post in a farmhouse, killed two of the garrison and drove the remainder into a cellar until assistance arrived. Subsequently, he rushed a strongly held post, capturing 20 more prisoners.

Amey later achieved the rank of corporal, and was demobilised in 1919. He is buried at Leamington Cemetery, Brunswick Street, Leamington Spa, Warwickshire, England. His Victoria Cross is displayed at the Royal Regiment of Fusiliers Museum (Royal Warwickshire), in [Pageant House, 2 Jury street Warwick, England.

== Bibliography ==
- Gliddon, Gerald (2014) [2000]. The Final Days 1918. VCs of the First World War. The History Press. ISBN 978-0-7509-5368-9.
