= Missy-sur-Aisne =

- Commune
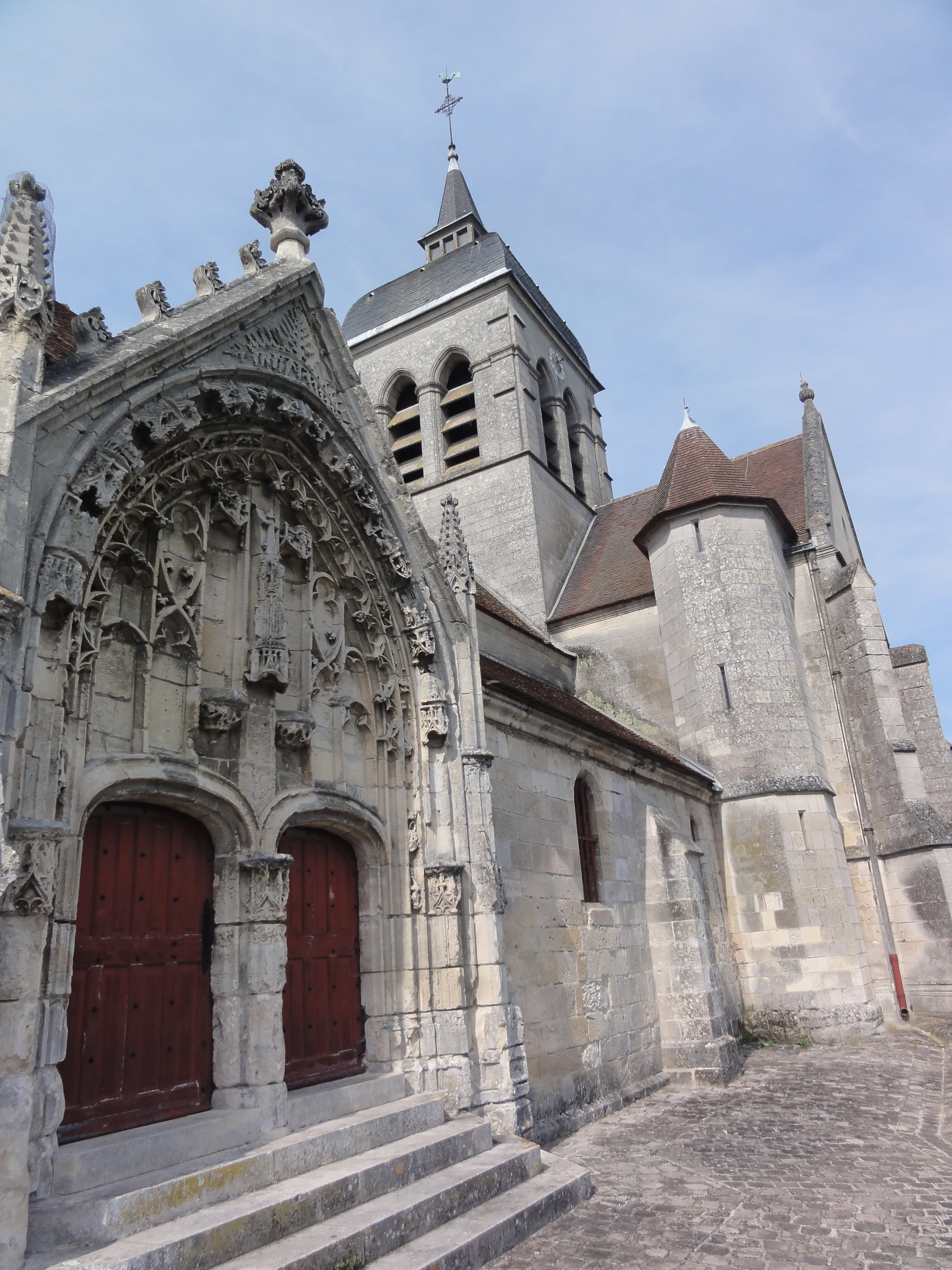
- The church of Missy-sur-Aisne
- Location of Missy-sur-Aisne
- Location within France Location within Hauts-de-France
- Coordinates: 49°23′14″N 3°26′11″E
- Country: France
- Region: Hauts-de-France
- Department: Aisne
- Arrondissement: Soissons
- Canton: Fère-en-Tardenois
- Intercommunality: Val de l'Aisne

Government
  - Mayor (2026–32): Claude Madiot
- Area^{1}: 3.25 km^{2} (1.25 sq mi)
- Elevation: 63 m (207 ft)
- Highest elevation: 152 m (499 ft)
- Lowest elevation: 42 m (138 ft)
- Population (2023): 625
  - Density: 192/km^{2} (498/sq mi)
- Time zone: UTC+01:00 (CET)
  - Summer (DST): UTC+02:00 (CEST)
- INSEE/Postal code: 02487 /02880
- ^{1} French Land Register data, which excludes lakes, ponds, glaciers > 1 km^{2} (0.386 sq mi or 247 acres) and river estuaries.

Missy-sur-Aisne (French pronunciation: [misi syʁ ɛn], literally Missy on Aisne) is a commune in the Aisne department in Hauts-de-France in northern France.

== Population ==
Historical population
Year	Pop.	±% p.a.
1968	320	—
1975	384	+2.64%
1982	522	+4.48%
1990	597	+1.69%
1999	667	+1.24%
2007	694	+0.50%
2012	672	−0.64%
2017	640	−0.97%
2023	625	−0.39%
Source: INSEE

== See also ==
- Communes of the Aisne department
