= Frémicourt =

- Commune
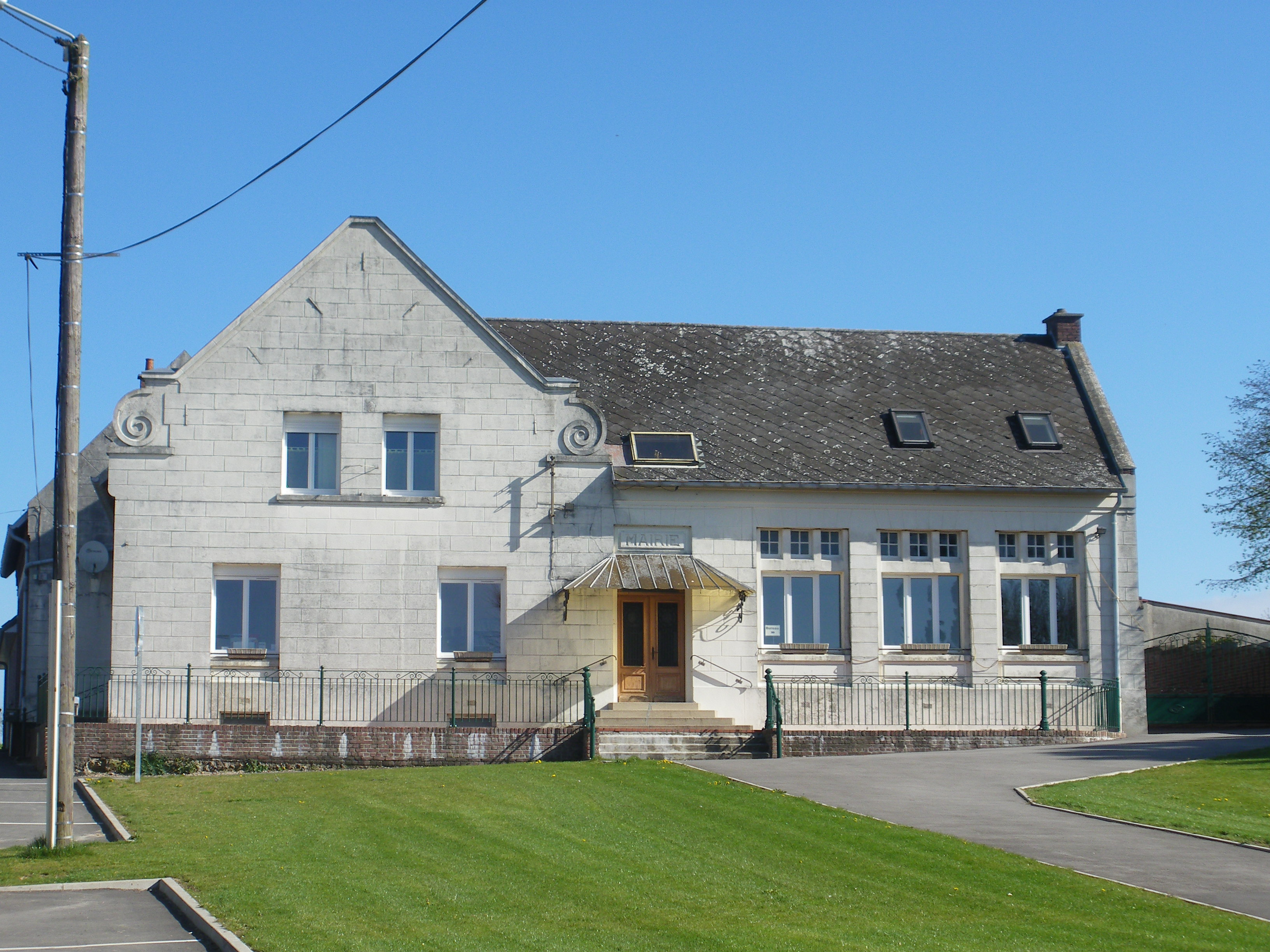
- The town hall of Frémicourt

- Coat of arms
- Location of Frémicourt
- Location within France Location within Hauts-de-France
- Coordinates: 50°06′42″N 2°54′11″E
- Country: France
- Region: Hauts-de-France
- Department: Pas-de-Calais
- Arrondissement: Arras
- Canton: Bapaume
- Intercommunality: CC Sud-Artois

Government
  - Mayor (2020–2026): Daniel Tabary
- Area^{1}: 5.63 km^{2} (2.17 sq mi)
- Elevation: 115 m (377 ft)
- Highest elevation: 127 m (417 ft)
- Lowest elevation: 98 m (322 ft)
- Population (2023): 239
  - Density: 42.5/km^{2} (110/sq mi)
- Time zone: UTC+01:00 (CET)
  - Summer (DST): UTC+02:00 (CEST)
- INSEE/Postal code: 62353 /62450
- ^{1} French Land Register data, which excludes lakes, ponds, glaciers > 1 km^{2} (0.386 sq mi or 247 acres) and river estuaries.

Frémicourt (French pronunciation: [fʁemikuʁ]) is a commune in the Pas-de-Calais department in the Hauts-de-France region of France 15 miles (24 km) south-southeast of Arras.

== Population ==
Historical population
Year	Pop.	±% p.a.
1968	301	—
1975	260	−2.07%
1982	219	−2.42%
1990	253	+1.82%
1999	285	+1.33%
2007	312	+1.14%
2012	265	−3.21%
2017	244	−1.64%
2023	239	−0.34%
Source: INSEE

== See also ==
- Communes of the Pas-de-Calais department
- Cecil Sewell Victoria Cross recipient after WW1 action near Frémicourt
