= Fontaine-lès-Croisilles =

- Commune
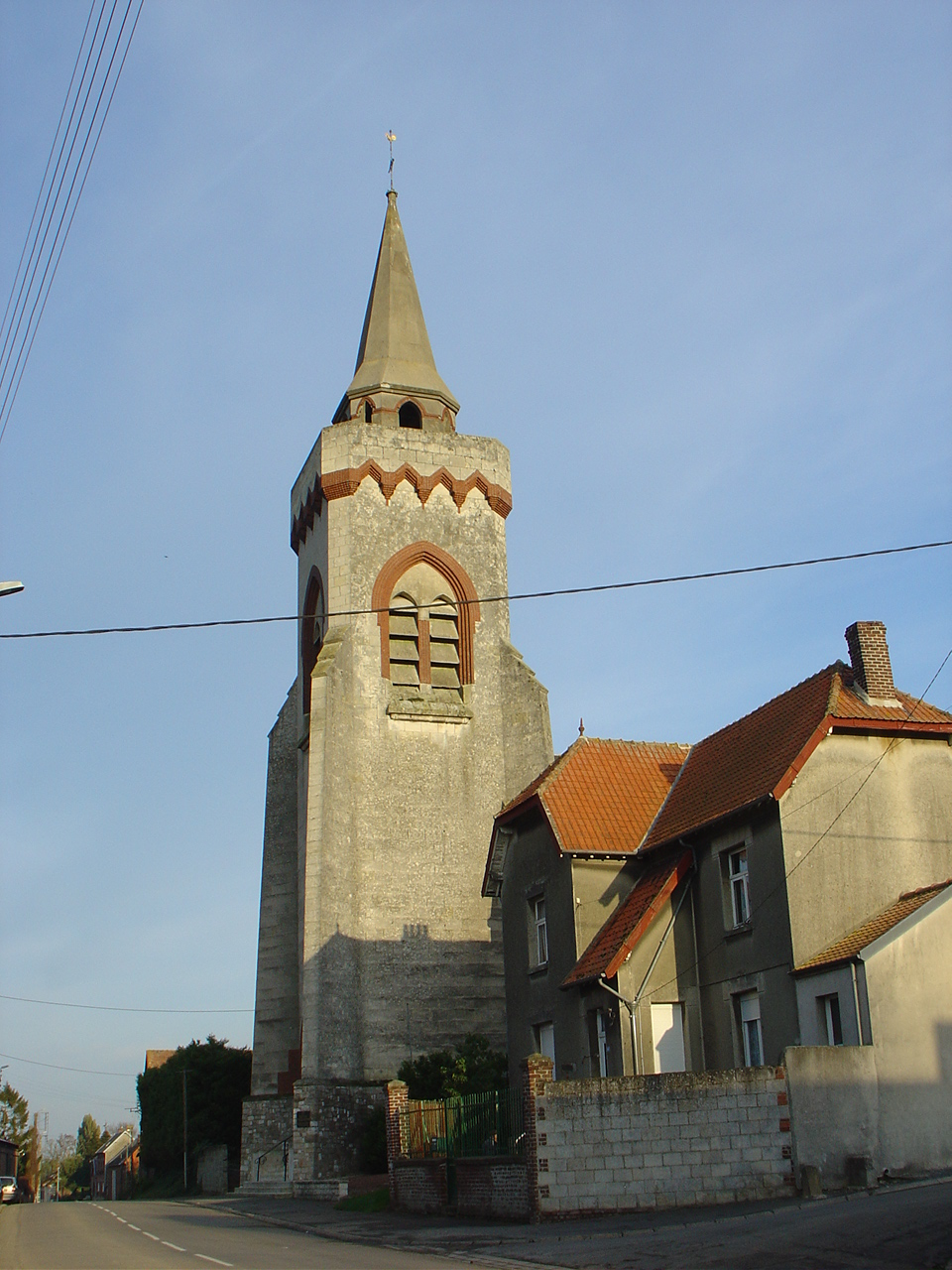
- The church of Fontaine-lès-Croisilles

- Coat of arms
- Location of Fontaine-lès-Croisilles
- Location within France Location within Hauts-de-France
- Coordinates: 50°13′10″N 2°54′34″E
- Country: France
- Region: Hauts-de-France
- Department: Pas-de-Calais
- Arrondissement: Arras
- Canton: Bapaume
- Intercommunality: CC Sud-Artois

Government
  - Mayor (2020–2026): Danièle Tabary
- Area^{1}: 6.26 km^{2} (2.42 sq mi)
- Elevation: 63 m (207 ft)
- Highest elevation: 98 m (322 ft)
- Lowest elevation: 57 m (187 ft)
- Population (2023): 273
  - Density: 43.6/km^{2} (113/sq mi)
- Time zone: UTC+01:00 (CET)
  - Summer (DST): UTC+02:00 (CEST)
- INSEE/Postal code: 62343 /62128
- ^{1} French Land Register data, which excludes lakes, ponds, glaciers > 1 km^{2} (0.386 sq mi or 247 acres) and river estuaries.

Fontaine-lès-Croisilles (French pronunciation: [fɔ̃tɛn lɛ kʁwazij], literally Fontaine near Croisilles) is a commune in the Pas-de-Calais department in the Hauts-de-France region of France 9 miles (14 km) southeast of Arras.

== Population ==
Historical population
Year	Pop.	±% p.a.
1968	235	—
1975	222	−0.81%
1982	228	+0.38%
1990	238	+0.54%
1999	257	+0.86%
2007	285	+1.30%
2012	280	−0.35%
2017	278	−0.14%
2023	273	−0.30%
Source: INSEE

== See also ==
- Communes of the Pas-de-Calais department
