= Le Verguier =

- Commune
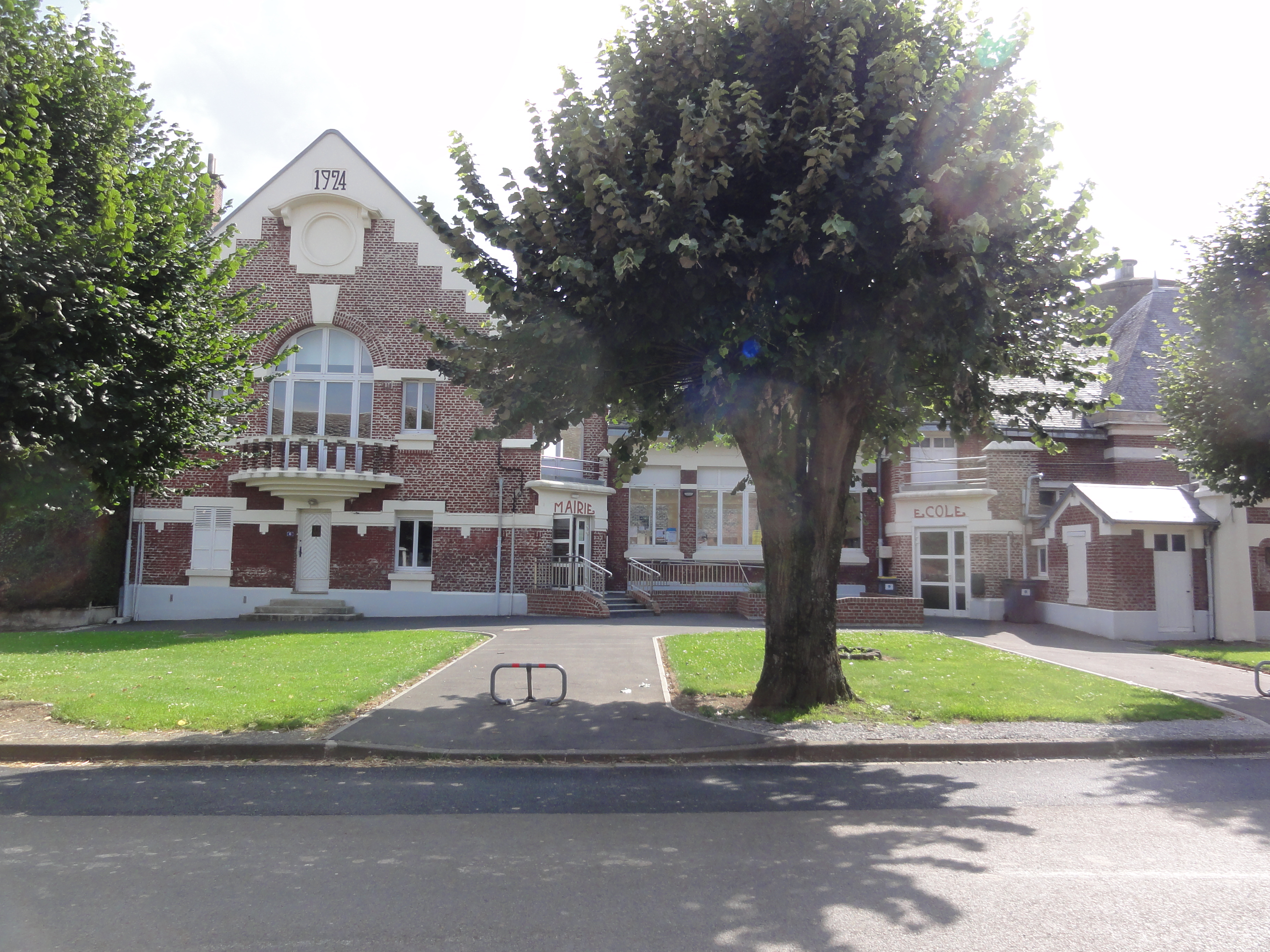
- The town hall and school of Le Verguier
- Location of Le Verguier
- Location within France Location within Hauts-de-France
- Coordinates: 49°55′30″N 3°10′15″E
- Country: France
- Region: Hauts-de-France
- Department: Aisne
- Arrondissement: Saint-Quentin
- Canton: Saint-Quentin-1
- Intercommunality: Pays du Vermandois

Government
  - Mayor (2026–32): Abdel Boudjemline
- Area^{1}: 4.28 km^{2} (1.65 sq mi)
- Elevation: 118 m (387 ft)
- Highest elevation: 135 m (443 ft)
- Lowest elevation: 74 m (243 ft)
- Population (2023): 212
  - Density: 49.5/km^{2} (128/sq mi)
- Time zone: UTC+01:00 (CET)
  - Summer (DST): UTC+02:00 (CEST)
- INSEE/Postal code: 02782 /02490
- ^{1} French Land Register data, which excludes lakes, ponds, glaciers > 1 km^{2} (0.386 sq mi or 247 acres) and river estuaries.

Le Verguier (French pronunciation: [lə vɛʁɡje]) is a commune in the Aisne department in Hauts-de-France in northern France.

== Population ==
Historical population
Year	Pop.	±% p.a.
1968	256	—
1975	218	−2.27%
1982	204	−0.94%
1990	225	+1.23%
1999	230	+0.24%
2007	231	+0.05%
2012	216	−1.33%
2017	219	+0.28%
2023	212	−0.54%
Source: INSEE

== See also ==
- Communes of the Aisne department
