= VCs of the First World War =

Books that list the Victoria Cross recipients of the First World War

VCs of the First World War is a series of books that list the Victoria Cross recipients of the First World War. The series consists of 13 books written by four different authors, first published under the label Sutton Publishing Limited, part of The History Press. A new paperback edition of the series was commissioned in 2010 under The History Press imprint.

== Books ==
=== Gerald Gliddon ===
Gerald Gliddon wrote eight of the books and has therefore written the majority of the series:

- VCs of the First World War: 1914
- VCs of the First World War: The Somme 1916
- VCs of the First World War: Arras & Messines 1917
- VCs of the First World War: Cambrai 1917
- VCs of the First World War: Spring Offensive 1918
- VCs of the First World War: The Road to Victory 1918
- VCs of the First World War: The Final Days 1918 covers the end of the First World War with the telling of the Battle of the Canal du Nord by seven Victoria Cross recipients, the battle led to the conquest of Cambrai by the Allied Powers. The book covers the remaining six weeks of the war in which 56 people received the Victoria Cross.
- VCs of the First World War: The Sideshows

=== Stephen Snelling ===
Stephen Snelling wrote 3 books:

- VCs of the First World War: Gallipoli covers the 39 recipients awarded the VC for their actions during the Gallipoli Campaign.
- VCs of the First World War: Passchendaele 1917 covers the 65 recipients awarded the VC for actions during the five month Battle of Passchendaele.
- VCs of the First World War: The Naval VCs covers the recipients in the Royal Navy.

=== Peter Cooksley and Peter F Batchelor ===
- VCs of the First World War: The Air VCs covers the recipients awarded the VC for actions in the air, this includes the Royal Naval Air Service, Royal Flying Corps and Royal Air Force.

=== Peter F Batchelor and Christopher Matson ===
- VCs of the First World War: The Western Front 1915 covers the recipients from the action on the Western Front in 1915.
