= Edward Cooper (VC) =

English recipient of the Victoria Cross

- Born: 4 May 1896; Stockton-on-Tees
- Died: 19 August 1985 (aged 89); Stockton-on-Tees
- Burial place: Teesside Crematorium, Middlesbrough
- Military career
- Allegiance: United Kingdom
- Branch: British Army
- Service years: 1914–1919
- Rank: Major
- Service number: 2794
- Units: King's Royal Rifle Corps
- Conflicts: World War I
- Awards: Victoria Cross; Médaille militaire (France)

Major Edward Cooper VC (4 May 1896 – 19 August 1985) was an English recipient of the Victoria Cross (VC), the highest and most prestigious award for gallantry in the face of the enemy that can be awarded to British and Commonwealth forces.

== Details ==
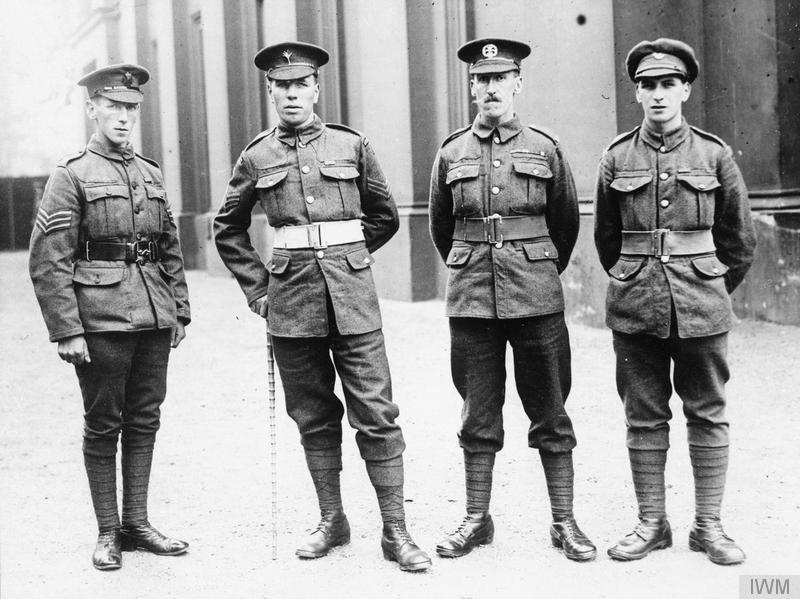
Group portrait of VC winners. Left to right: Edward Cooper (left), awarded the VC: Belgium, 16 August 1917; Robert Bye, awarded the VC, Belgium, 31 July 1917; William Ratcliffe, awarded the VC, Belgium, 14 June 1917; Wilfred Edwards, awarded the VC, Belgium, 16 August 1917.

Cooper was 21 years old, and a Sergeant in the 12th Battalion, The King's Royal Rifle Corps, British Army during the First World War when the following deed took place on 16 August 1917 at Langemarck, during the Battle of Passchendaele for which he was awarded the VC.

The citation was published in the London Gazette on 14 September 1917, and reads:

"No. R.2794 Sjt. Edward Cooper, K.R.R.C. (Stockton).

For most conspicuous bravery and initiative in attack. Enemy machine guns from a concrete blockhouse, 250 yards away, were holding up the advance of the battalion on his left, and were also causing heavy casualties to his own battalion. Sjt. Cooper, with four men, immediately rushed towards the blockhouse, though heavily fired on. About 100 yards distant he ordered his men to lie down and fire at the blockhouse. Finding this did not silence the machine guns, he immediately rushed forward straight at them and fired his revolver into an opening in the blockhouse. The machine guns ceased firing and the garrison surrendered. Seven machine guns and forty-five prisoners were captured in this blockhouse.

By this magnificent act of courage he undoubtedly saved what might have been a serious check to the whole advance, at the same time saving a great number of lives."

== Later years ==
He later achieved the rank of Major. His medal is on display at Preston Park Museum & Grounds in Stockton. Major Cooper was cremated at Teesside Crematorium.

== Bibliography ==
- Snelling, Stephen (2012) [1998]. Passchendaele 1917. VCs of the First World War. The History Press. ISBN 978-0752476667.
- Whitworth, Alan (2015). VCs of the North: Cumbria, Durham & Northumberland. Pen and Sword Books. ISBN 978-1473848221.
