= Wilfred Edwards (VC) =

English recipient of the Victoria Cross

Major Wilfred Edwards VC
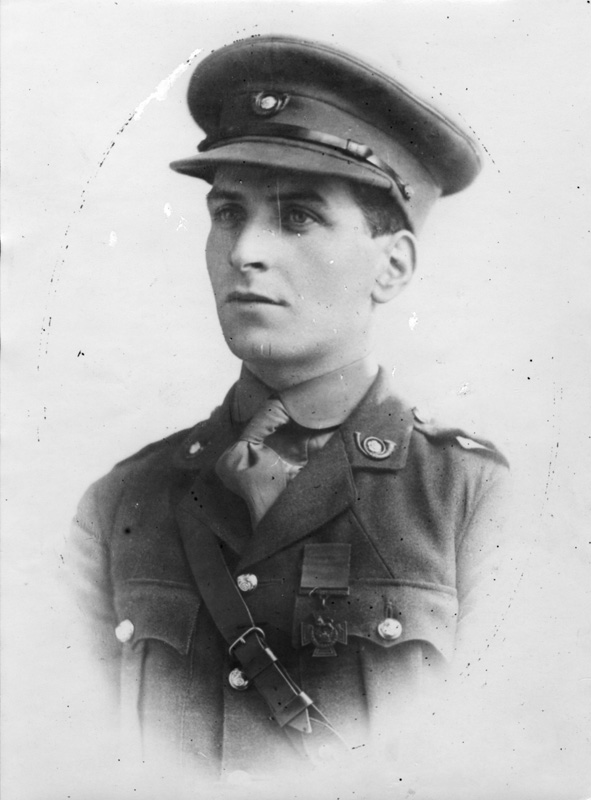
- Born: 16 February 1893; Norwich, Norfolk
- Died: 4 January 1972 (aged 78); Leeds, West Yorkshire
- Burial place: Upper and Lower Wortley Cemetery, Leeds
- Military career
- Allegiance: United Kingdom
- Branch: British Army
- Rank: Major
- Units: King's Own Yorkshire Light Infantry; Royal Army Ordnance Corps
- Conflicts: World War I World War II
- Awards: Victoria Cross

Major Wilfred Edwards VC (16 February 1893 – 4 January 1972) was an English recipient of the Victoria Cross, the highest and most prestigious award for gallantry in the face of the enemy by British and Commonwealth forces.

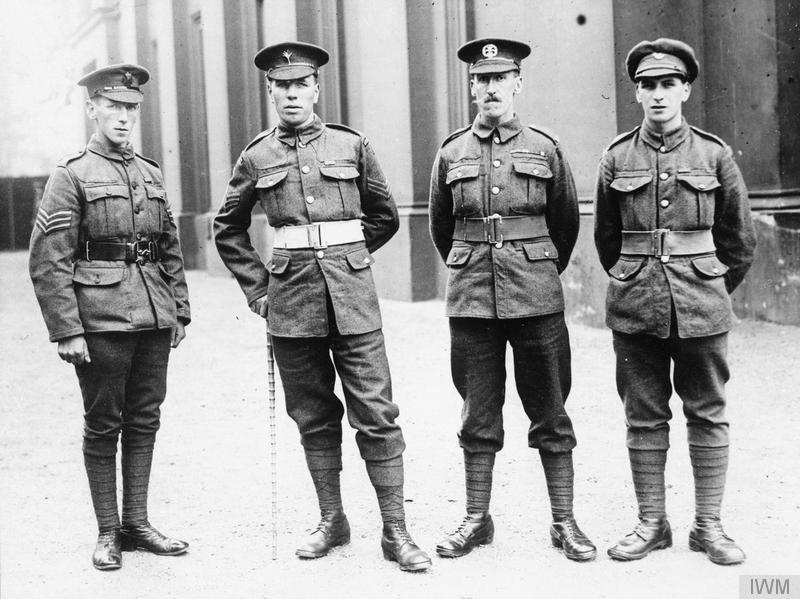
Group portrait of VC winners. Left to right: Edward Cooper (left), awarded the VC: Belgium, 16 August 1917; Robert Bye, awarded the VC, Belgium, 31 July 1917; William Ratcliffe, awarded the VC, Belgium, 14 June 1917; Wilfred Edwards, awarded the VC, Belgium, 16 August 1917.

Edwards was born on 16 February 1893. He was 24 years old, and a private in the 7th Battalion, The King's Own Yorkshire Light Infantry, British Army during the First World War, and was awarded the VC for his actions on 16 August 1917 at Langemarck, Belgium:

When all the company officers were lost, Private Edwards, without hesitation and under heavy machine-gun and rifle fire from a strong concrete fort, dashed forward at great personal risk, bombed through the loopholes, surmounted the fort and waved to his company to advance. Three officers and 30 other ranks were taken prisoner by him in the fort. Later he did most valuable work as a runner and eventually guided most of the battalion out through very difficult ground. Throughout he set a splendid example and was utterly regardless of danger.

Edwards was commissioned a second lieutenant in December 1917 and was demobilised in June 1919. He re-enlisted in the army when World War II broke out and rose to the rank of major.

He died in January 1972. His medals are displayed in the Kings Own Yorkshire Light Infantry Museum, Doncaster, England.

== Bibliography ==
- Snelling, Stephen (2012) [1998]. Passchendaele 1917. VCs of the First World War. The History Press. ISBN 978-0752476667.
- Whitworth, Alan (2012). Yorkshire VCs. Pen and Sword Books. ISBN 978-1-84884-778-1.
