= Robert Bye =

Recipient of the Victoria Cross

Robert James Bye
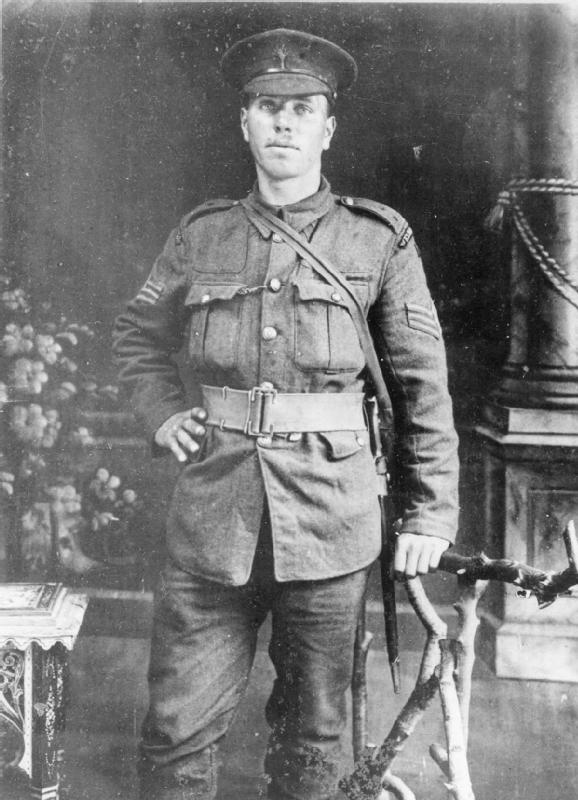
- Born: 12 December 1889; Pontypridd, Glamorganshire, Wales
- Died: 23 August 1962 (aged 72); Warsop, Nottinghamshire, England
- Burial place: Warsop Cemetery
- Military career
- Allegiance: United Kingdom
- Branch: British Army
- Service years: 1914−1921; 1939−1940
- Rank: Sergeant Major
- Service number: 939
- Units: Welsh Guards; Sherwood Foresters
- Conflicts: World War I World War II
- Awards: Victoria Cross

Sergeant Major Robert James Bye VC (12 December 1889 − 23 August 1962) was a British Army soldier and a Welsh recipient of the Victoria Cross (VC), the highest and most prestigious award for gallantry in the face of the enemy that can be awarded to British and Commonwealth forces. He was born in Pontypridd.

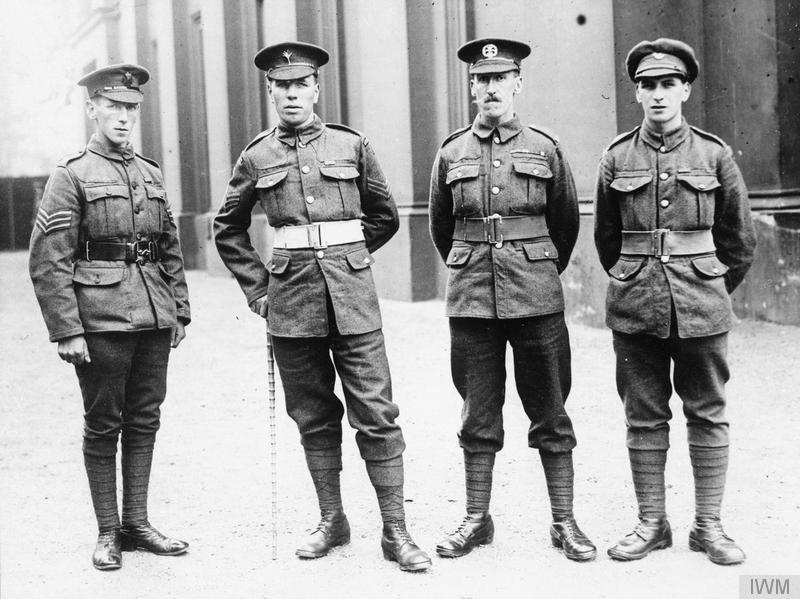
Group portrait of VC winners. Left to right: Edward Cooper (left), awarded the VC: Belgium, 16 August 1917; Robert Bye, awarded the VC, Belgium, 31 July 1917; William Ratcliffe, awarded the VC, Belgium, 14 June 1917; Wilfred Edwards, awarded the VC, Belgium, 16 August 1917.

He was 27 years old, and a Sergeant in the 1st Bn., Welsh Guards, British Army during the First World War when the following deed took place on 31 July 1917 at the Yser Canal, Belgium during the Third Battle of Ypres for which he was awarded the VC.

When the 1/Welsh Guards attacked Pilckem Ridge the leading units, following a creeping barrage, achieved their first objective of the Black Line, but were then halted by two pill boxes. Bye rushed one, put it out of action and then rejoined his unit.

After suffering heavy casualties the Guards moved on to attack the Green Line. Held up by a series of blockhouses, Bye volunteered to take charge of a party, which captured the blockhouses along with many prisoners. Still more prisoners were taken when he advanced to the Green Line.

His citation read:

No. 939 Sgt. Robert Bye, Welsh Guards (Penrhiwceiber, Glamorgan).

For most conspicuous bravery. Sgt.Bye displayed the utmost courage and devotion to duty during an attack on the enemy's position. Seeing that the leading waves were being troubled by two enemy blockhouses, he, on his own initiative, rushed at one of them and put the garrison out of action. He then rejoined his company and went forward to the assault of the second objective.

When the troops had gone forward to the attack on the third objective, a party was detailed to clear up a line of blockhouses which had been passed. Sgt. Bye volunteered to take charge of this party, accomplished his object, and took many prisoners. He subsequently advanced to the third objective, capturing a number of prisoners, thus rendering invaluable assistance to the assaulting companies. He displayed throughout the most remarkable initiative.

Bye, who moved to Nottinghamshire to work as a coal miner, also served in World War II as a sergeant major in the Sherwood Foresters guarding prisoners of war until ill health (arising from his pit work) forced him to leave the army. He then served in the Home Guard and as a temporary police constable.

His Victoria Cross is displayed at The Guards Regimental Headquarters (Welsh Guards RHQ) in London, England.

== Bibliography ==
- Snelling, Stephen (2012) [1998]. Passchendaele 1917. VCs of the First World War. The History Press. ISBN 978-0752476667.
