= William Ratcliffe =

English Victoria Cross recipient (1884–1963)

- Born: 18 January 1884; Liverpool, Lancashire, England
- Died: 26 March 1963 (aged 79); Liverpool, Lancashire, England
- Burial place: Allerton Cemetery, Liverpool, England
- Military career
- Allegiance: United Kingdom
- Branch: British Army
- Rank: Private
- Units: The South Lancashire Regiment
- Conflicts: Second Boer War; World War I
- Awards: Victoria Cross; Military Medal

William Ratcliffe VC MM (18 January 1884 – 26 March 1963) was an English private of South Lancashire Regiment. He was a recipient of the Victoria Cross, the highest and most prestigious award for gallantry in the face of the enemy that can be awarded to British and Commonwealth forces.

== Biography ==
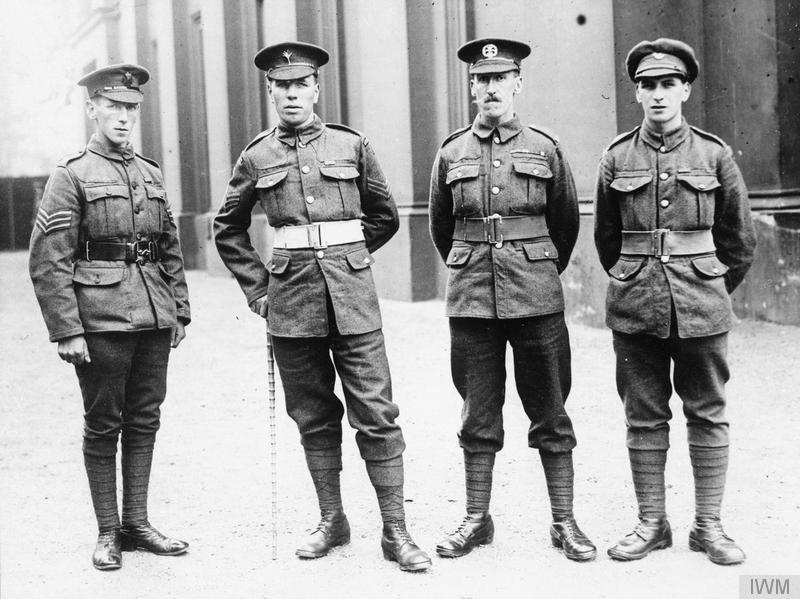
Group portrait of VC winners. Left to right: Edward Cooper (left), awarded the VC: Belgium, 16 August 1917; Robert Bye, awarded the VC, Belgium, 31 July 1917; William Ratcliffe, awarded the VC, Belgium, 14 June 1917; Wilfred Edwards, awarded the VC, Belgium, 16 August 1917.

William Ratcliffe was born on 18 January 1884 at 38 Newhall Street, Liverpool, Lancashire. His parents were William Ratcliffe and Mary Ann Kelly. He was baptised at St Vincent de Paul Roman Catholic Church on 21 January 1884. His birth was not registered by his mother until 31 March 1884. His mother gave his month of birth as February in order to avoid late registration of the birth. He was educated at St. Vincent de Paul's Roman Catholic School in Norfolk Street, Liverpool.

Ratcliffe worked on the Liverpool docks briefly after leaving school, then joined the British Army at the age of 17 and served in South Africa during the Second Boer War and in India. He initially served with the South Lancashire Regiment, 3rd Battalion and later transferred to the Durham Light Infantry. By 1914 he had left the army and was back working as a docker in Liverpool. When war was declared he quickly re-joined, enlisting with the South Lancashire Regiment in August 1914. He won the Military Medal and Victoria Cross at the Battle of Messines (1917).

In 1929 Victoria Cross winners were invited, by the Prince of Wales, to attend a dinner at the Royal Gallery of the House of Lords. Ratcliffe was reluctant to attend due to lack of funds. After a newspaper story was published about him, the people of Liverpool raised money to kit him out in a new suit suitable for the occasion. He worked on the Liverpool Docks until an industrial accident forced him into early retirement in the 1940s. In 1956 he attended the Centennial of the institution of the Victoria Cross in London's Hyde Park, where the living holders were reviewed by Queen Elizabeth II. On this occasion the Victoria Cross Association paid for a new suit and accommodation.

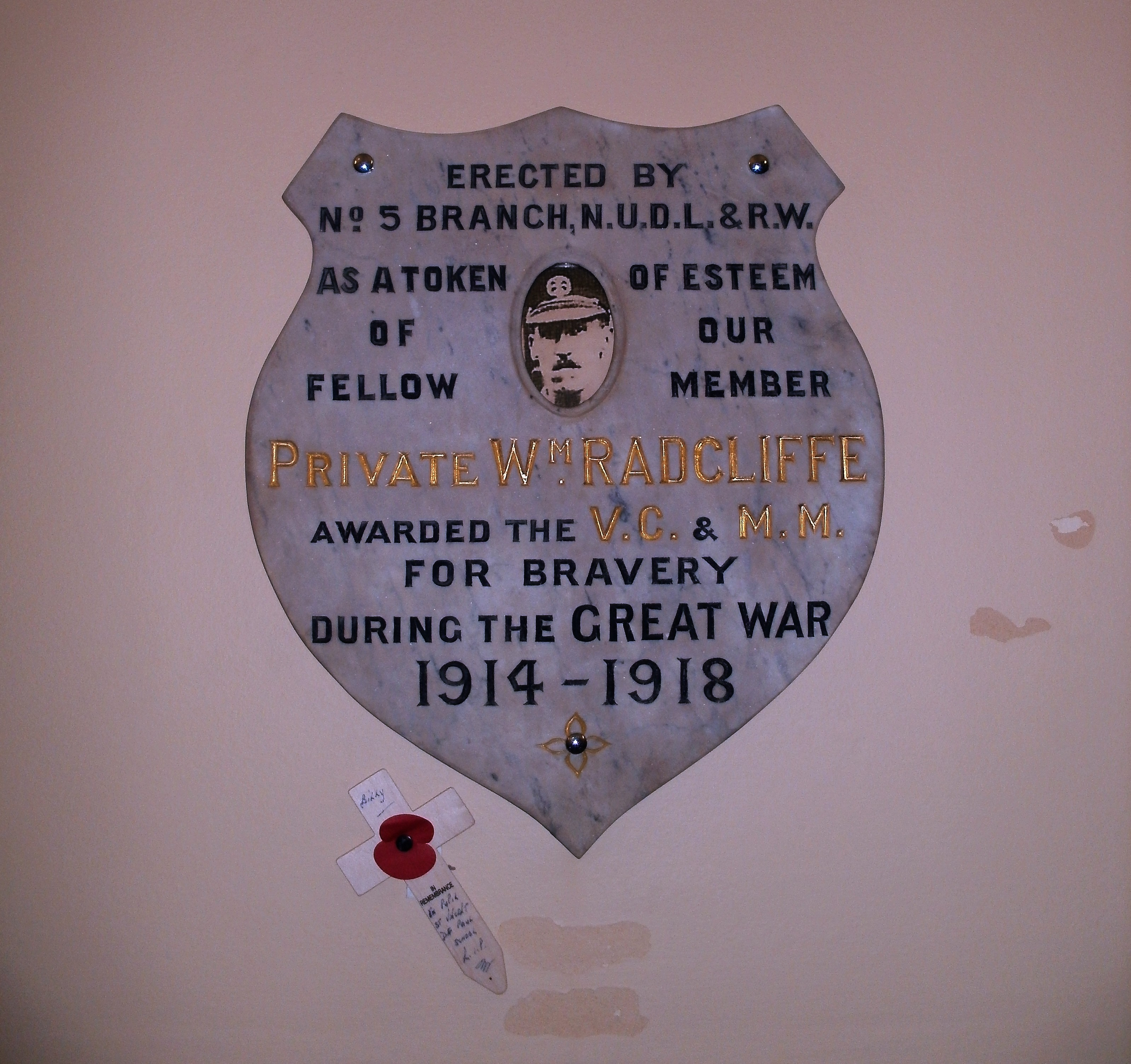
Memorial in Liverpool Town Hall

== Details ==
Ratcliffe was 33 years old, and a private in the 2nd Battalion, the South Lancashire Regiment, British Army during the First World War when the following deed took place during the Battle of Messines for which he was awarded the VC.

On 14 June 1917 at Messines, Belgium, after an enemy trench had been captured, Private Ratcliffe located an enemy machine-gun which was firing on his comrades from the rear, and single-handed, on his own initiative, immediately rushed the machine-gun position and bayoneted the crew. He then brought the gun back into action in the front line. Private Ratcliffe had displayed similar gallantry and resource on previous occasions.

== The medal ==
His VC is on loan to the Imperial War Museum in Lambeth Road, London.

== Bibliography ==
- Gliddon, Gerald (2012) [1998]. Arras and Messines 1917. VCs of the First World War. Stroud, Gloucestershire: The History Press. ISBN 978-0-7524-6604-0.
- Murphy, James (2008). Liverpool VCs. Pen and Sword Books. ISBN 978-1844157808.
