= Masnières =

- Commune
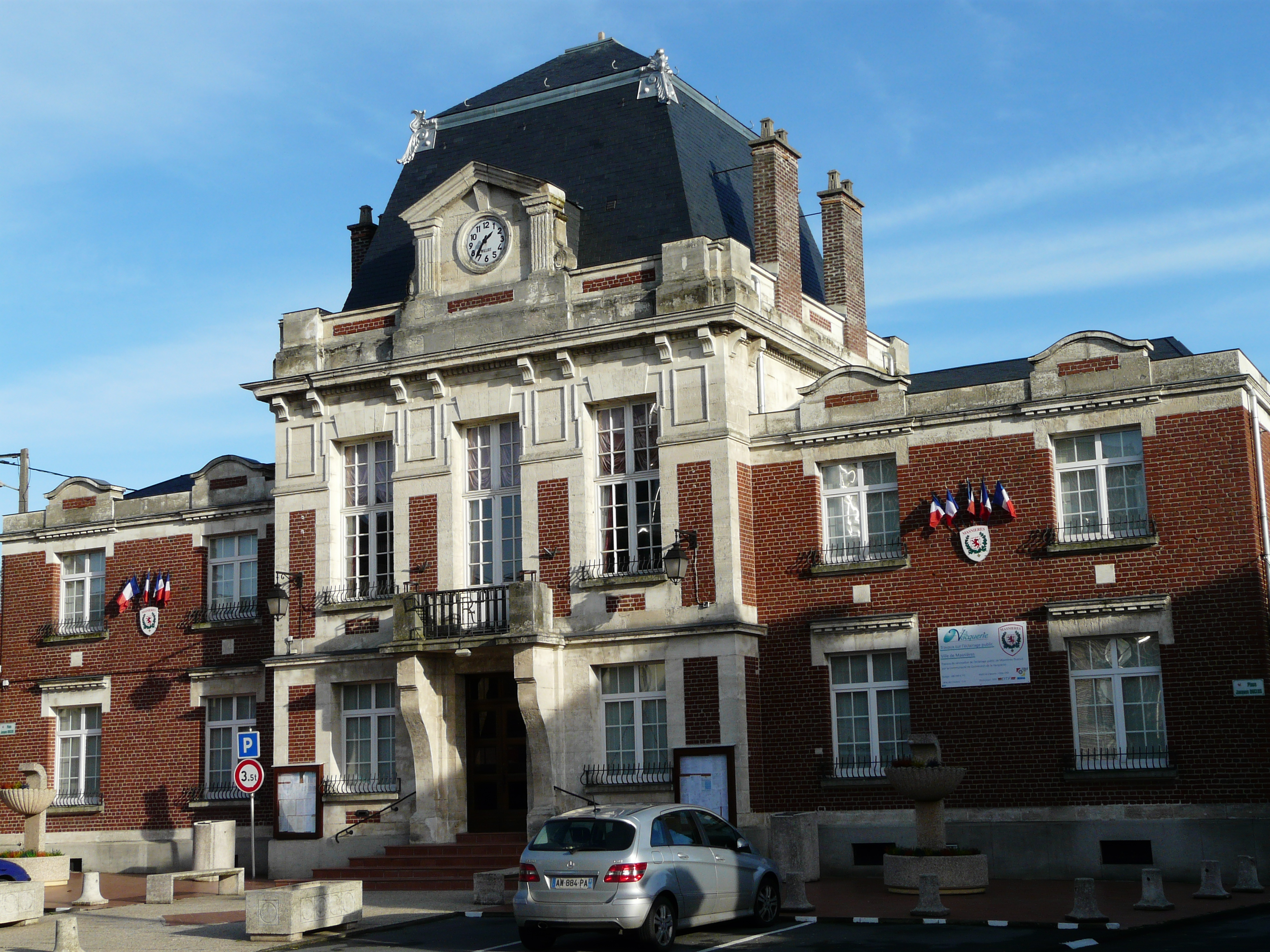
- The town hall in Masnières

- Coat of arms
- Location of Masnières
- Location within France Location within Hauts-de-France
- Coordinates: 50°06′57″N 3°12′38″E
- Country: France
- Region: Hauts-de-France
- Department: Nord
- Arrondissement: Cambrai
- Canton: Le Cateau-Cambrésis
- Intercommunality: CA Cambrai

Government
  - Mayor (2020–2026): Francis Noblecourt
- Area^{1}: 10.97 km^{2} (4.24 sq mi)
- Elevation: 62 m (203 ft)
- Highest elevation: 119 m (390 ft)
- Lowest elevation: 54 m (177 ft)
- Population (2023): 2,689
  - Density: 245.1/km^{2} (634.9/sq mi)
- Time zone: UTC+01:00 (CET)
  - Summer (DST): UTC+02:00 (CEST)
- INSEE/Postal code: 59389 /59241
- ^{1} French Land Register data, which excludes lakes, ponds, glaciers > 1 km^{2} (0.386 sq mi or 247 acres) and river estuaries.

Masnières (French pronunciation: [manjɛʁ]) is a commune in the Nord department in northern France.

== Population ==
Historical population
Year	Pop.	±% p.a.
1968	2,351	—
1975	2,446	+0.57%
1982	2,655	+1.18%
1990	2,708	+0.25%
1999	2,525	−0.77%
2007	2,589	+0.31%
2012	2,650	+0.47%
2017	2,717	+0.50%
2023	2,689	−0.17%
Source: INSEE

== Heraldry ==
Arms of Masnières	The arms of Masnières are blazoned: Azure, an inescutcheon between in orle 11 billets argent. (Ligny-en-Cambrésis, Masnières and Villers-au-Tertre use the same arms.)

== History ==
Masnières figured into the 1917 Battle of Cambrai during which time it was briefly captured by the British on the first day of the battle, November 20, and held for twelve days to protect vital bridgeheads between Masnières and Marcoing before the British withdrawal under the weight of heavy German counter-attack.

The actions of the battle are commemorated in and around Masnières by several Commonwealth War Graves Commission landmarks in and around the town, including:

- Masnières Newfoundland Memorial
- Masnières British Cemetery
- Marcoing British Cemetery

== See also ==
- Communes of the Nord department
- Marcel Gaumont. Sculpture on church
