= Thomas Neely =

Recipient of the Victoria Cross

Thomas Patrick Neely
- Born: 28 March 1897; Poulton-cum-Seacombe, Wallasey, Cheshire, England
- Died: 1 October 1918 (aged 21) †; Rumilly-en-Cambrésis, near Cambrai, France
- Burial place: Masnieres British Cemetery, Marcoing, France
- Military career
- Allegiance: United Kingdom
- Branch: British Army
- Service years: 1914–1918
- Rank: Lance Sergeant
- Service number: 32827
- Units: Cheshire Regiment; The King's Own Royal Lancaster Regiment
- Conflicts: First World War: Hundred Days Offensive; Battle of the Canal du Nord †
- Awards: Victoria Cross; Military Medal

Lance Sergeant Thomas Patrick Neely, VC, MM (28 March 1897 – 1 October 1918) was an English recipient of the Victoria Cross (VC), the highest award for gallantry in the face of the enemy that can be awarded to British and Commonwealth forces. A soldier with The King's Own Royal Lancaster Regiment, he was awarded the VC for his actions in late September 1918, during the Hundred Days Offensive of the First World War. He was killed in action a few days later.

== Early life ==
Thomas Neely was born on 28 March 1897 in Poulton-cum-Seacombe, Wallasey, then part of Cheshire, one of seven children of James and Agnes Neely. The family surname was often spelt Neeley. His father was a gasfitter but performed labouring work for several years. The family moved to Walton in Liverpool, where Neely attended St. Fancis de Sales School. After finishing his education, Neely worked for a grain mill that produced animal feed.

== First World War ==
In September 1914, Neely enlisted in the British Army. Of small stature, he was posted to the Cheshire Regiment's Bantam Battalion, but later transferred to The King's Own Royal Lancaster Regiment, part of 76th Brigade, 3rd Division. In July 1918, Neely's award of a Military Medal (MM) was gazetted and he was sent on leave shortly afterwards. On his return to his unit, the 8th Battalion, he was promoted to corporal.

During the Battle of the Canal du Nord on 27 September, the 8th Battalion was leading the advance of 76th Brigade. It encountered a series of machinegun posts at the village of Flesquières, which made casualties of most of the battalion's officers. The advance was held up until Neely and two others assaulted the machinegun posts. Later in the advance, he made additional solo forays to deal with German-held positions that were delaying the battalion. For his actions, he was awarded the Victoria Cross (VC). The VC, instituted in 1856, was the highest award for valour that could be bestowed on a soldier of the British Empire. The citation read as follows:

For most conspicuous bravery during operations at Flesquières on 27 Sept. 1918. His company was held up during the advance by heavy machine-gun fire from a flank. Corporal Neeley [sic], realising the seriousness of the situation, at once, under point-blank fire, dashed out with two men and rushed the positions, disposing of the garrisons and capturing three machine-guns. Subsequently, on two successive occasions, he rushed concrete strongpoints, killing or capturing the occupants. The splendid initiative and fighting spirit displayed by this gallant non-commissioned officer in dealing with a series of posts, in some cases single-handed, was largely responsible for the taking and clearing of a heavily fortified and strongly garrisoned position, and enabled his company to advance 3,000 yards along the Hindenburg support line.

— The London Gazette, 13 December 1918

Immediately after his VC-winning action, Neely was promoted in the field to lance sergeant. Neely was killed in action just a few days later, on 1 October 1918, at Rumilly-en-Cambrésis, just south of Cambrai. He was buried at Masnieres British Cemetery in Marcoing. King George V presented Neely's VC to his parents in a ceremony at Buckingham Palace on 27 February 1920.

There are several memorials to Neely; a plaque at the Priory in Lancaster, a memorial board in Wallasey Town Hall, and he is listed, along with the names of 11 other VC winners from the Wirral, Ellesmere Port, and Neston districts, on a plaque on the Birkenhead Cenotaph Memorial.

== Medals ==
Neely's family retained his medals, absent the campaign medals to which he was entitled but which was never received, for several decades. In June 2010, it was alleged that the VC and MM was stolen from his grand-nephew's home. However, this was found to be a hoax and the grand-nephew was later charged for wasting police time. The family later put the VC and MM up for auction and it was sold on 25 November 2010 to a private buyer for £110,000.
