= Beugny =

- Commune
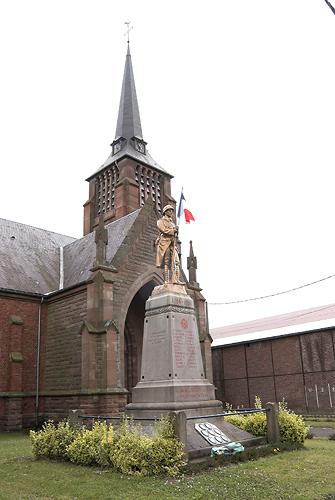
- The church of Beugny

- Coat of arms
- Location of Beugny
- Location within France Location within Hauts-de-France
- Coordinates: 50°07′15″N 2°56′06″E
- Country: France
- Region: Hauts-de-France
- Department: Pas-de-Calais
- Arrondissement: Arras
- Canton: Bapaume
- Intercommunality: CC du Sud-Artois

Government
  - Mayor (2020–2026): Jean-Claude Mayeux
- Area^{1}: 5.83 km^{2} (2.25 sq mi)
- Elevation: 121 m (397 ft)
- Highest elevation: 127 m (417 ft)
- Lowest elevation: 99 m (325 ft)
- Population (2023): 351
  - Density: 60.2/km^{2} (156/sq mi)
- Time zone: UTC+01:00 (CET)
  - Summer (DST): UTC+02:00 (CEST)
- INSEE/Postal code: 62122 /62124
- ^{1} French Land Register data, which excludes lakes, ponds, glaciers > 1 km^{2} (0.386 sq mi or 247 acres) and river estuaries.

Beugny (French pronunciation: [bœɲi]) is a commune in the Pas-de-Calais department in the Hauts-de-France region in northern France.

== Geography ==
A farming village located 20 miles (32 km) southeast of Arras at the junction of the N30 and D20 roads.

== History ==
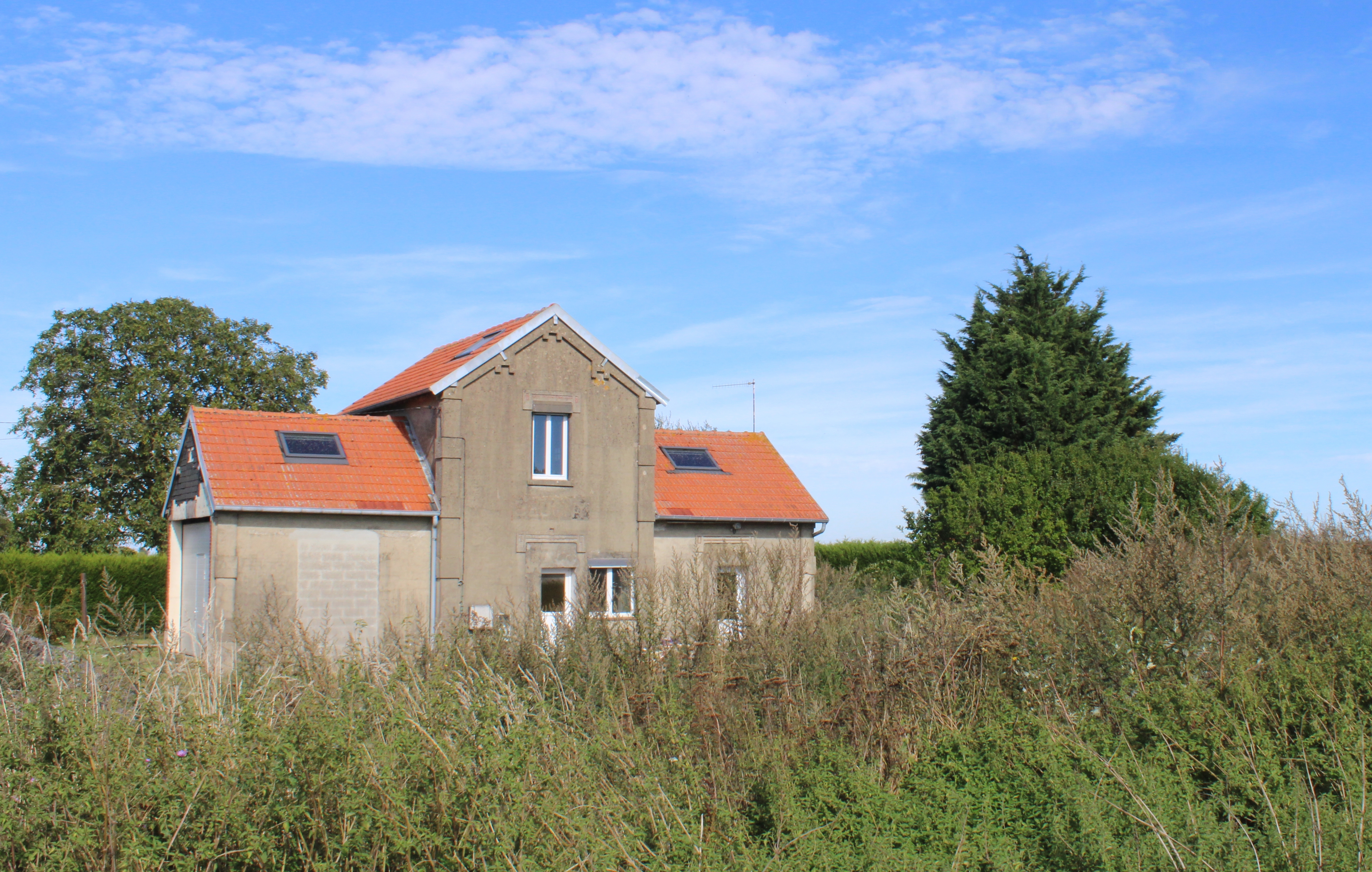
Railway station of Beugny

In 1877 the Bapaume to Havrincourt section of the Achiet–Marcoing railway opened. This line was built to further expand sugar beet cultivation in the area. The station was still standing in 2022.

== Population ==
Historical population
Year	Pop.	±% p.a.
1968	354	—
1975	360	+0.24%
1982	300	−2.57%
1990	319	+0.77%
1999	319	+0.00%
2007	329	+0.39%
2012	376	+2.71%
2017	376	+0.00%
2023	351	−1.14%
Source: INSEE

== Sights ==
- The church of St. Géry, rebuilt, like most of the village, after the ravages of World War I.
- The ruins of a chateau.

== See also ==
- Communes of the Pas-de-Calais department
