= Masnieres British Cemetery =

CWGC cemetery in Nord, France

Coordinates: 50°7′04.0″N 3°11′15.2″E

- Commonwealth War Graves Commission
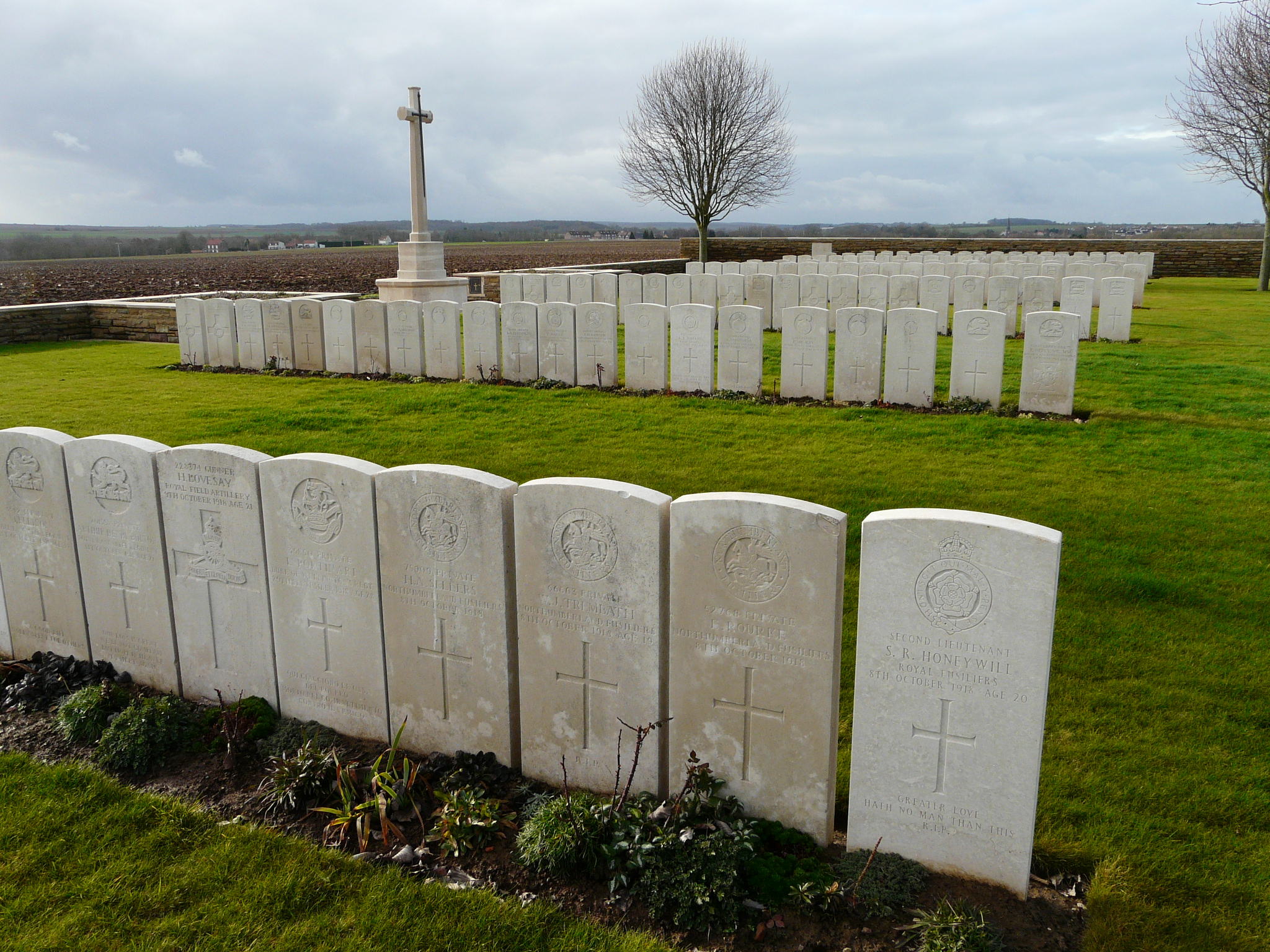
- Used for those deceased September–October 1918
- Established: 1918
- Location: near Marcoing, Cambrai, France
- Total burials: 225
- Unknowns: 56

Burials by nation
- Allied Powers: United Kingdom: 147 (16 unidentified); New Zealand: 19; Central Powers: German Empire: 59 (40 unidentified)

Burials by war
- World War I: 225

Masnieres British Commonwealth War Graves Commission Cemetery is a small Commonwealth War Graves Commission (CWGC) burial site for British Empire (later Commonwealth) troops killed during the First World War Battle of Cambrai (1918) between September–October 1918. It also contains a number of German graves, although these are mostly unidentified.

The cemetery is located 1 kilometre southeast of the village of Marcoing, 4 miles (6.4 km) southwest of Cambrai. Opened by the III Corps Burial Officer in October 1918, the cemetery covers an area of 995 square metres (10,710 sq ft) and is enclosed by a stone rubble wall. Its grounds were assigned to the British Empire in perpetuity by the French state in recognition of the sacrifices made by the Allies in the defence of France during the war.

The Masnières Newfoundland Memorial, which commemorates the Royal Newfoundland Regiment's losses in 1917 in the Battle of Cambrai is located nearby, but is not a part of the cemetery. The Royal Newfoundland Regiment are honoured by 5 overseas memorials: the Beaumont Hamel Memorial, the Gueudecourt Memorial, the Monchy-le-Preux Memorial and the Masnières Memorial.

== Notable graves ==
The cemetery contains the grave of Thomas Neely VC MM (1897–1918), who was killed in action just south of Cambrai on 1 October 1918, three days after his Victoria Cross action. A second Victoria Cross holder, Henry Tandey VC, DCM, MM, had his ashes interred in the cemetery at his request following his death in 1977.
