= Lone gunner of Flesquières =

Possibly-mythical German soldier (1917)

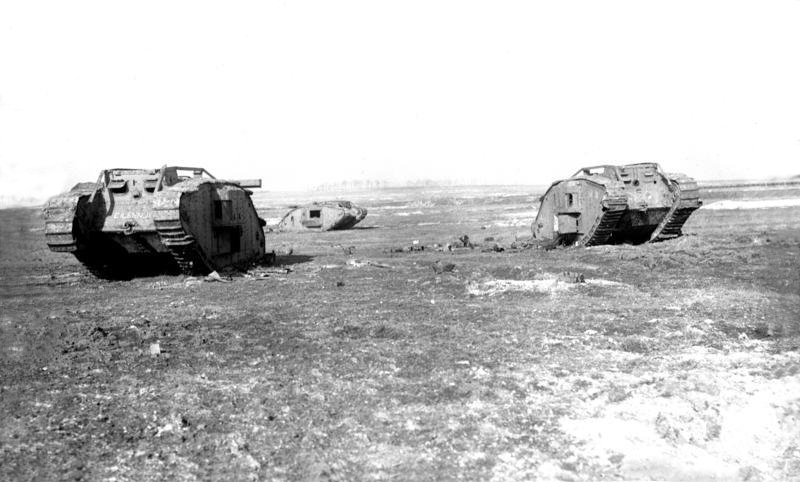
Destroyed British Mark IV tanks at Cambrai

The lone gunner of Flesquières is a possibly mythical German officer who is credited with destroying up to 16 British tanks at Flesquières, France, during the first day of the Battle of Cambrai on 20 November 1917. British tanks were generally successful in their attacks on 20 November, except at Flesquières, where many were disabled by German artillery. British Commander-in Chief Field Marshal Sir Douglas Haig visited the battlefield two days later and was given an account by a British officer that stated that many of the tanks were destroyed by a single German artillery officer who had remained with his gun when his men fled and was killed at his post. Haig included the account in his March 1918 dispatch on the battle. It provided a convenient excuse for the failure to progress at Flesquières and a reminder to his men of the importance of close cooperation between infantry and the tanks.

The story was retold in various works after the war, though the British official history of the battle and other works have labelled it a myth. In the post-war era, the Germans, particularly the Nazi Party, were keen to celebrate the lone gunner as a hero and efforts were made to identify him. In 1929, a work by fervent Nazi Lieutenant Erwin Zindler identified Unteroffizier Johannes Joachim Theodor Krüger of No. 8 Battery, 108th Field Artillery Regiment, as the lone gunner. This identification may be spurious; Krüger was badly wounded in battle and died in British captivity on 10 December. Former members of the 108th Field Artillery Regiment suggested Feuerwerksleutnant Behrmann, commander of No. 9 Battery, as a more likely candidate, though his unit was based at Marcoing on the day of the action.

== Background ==
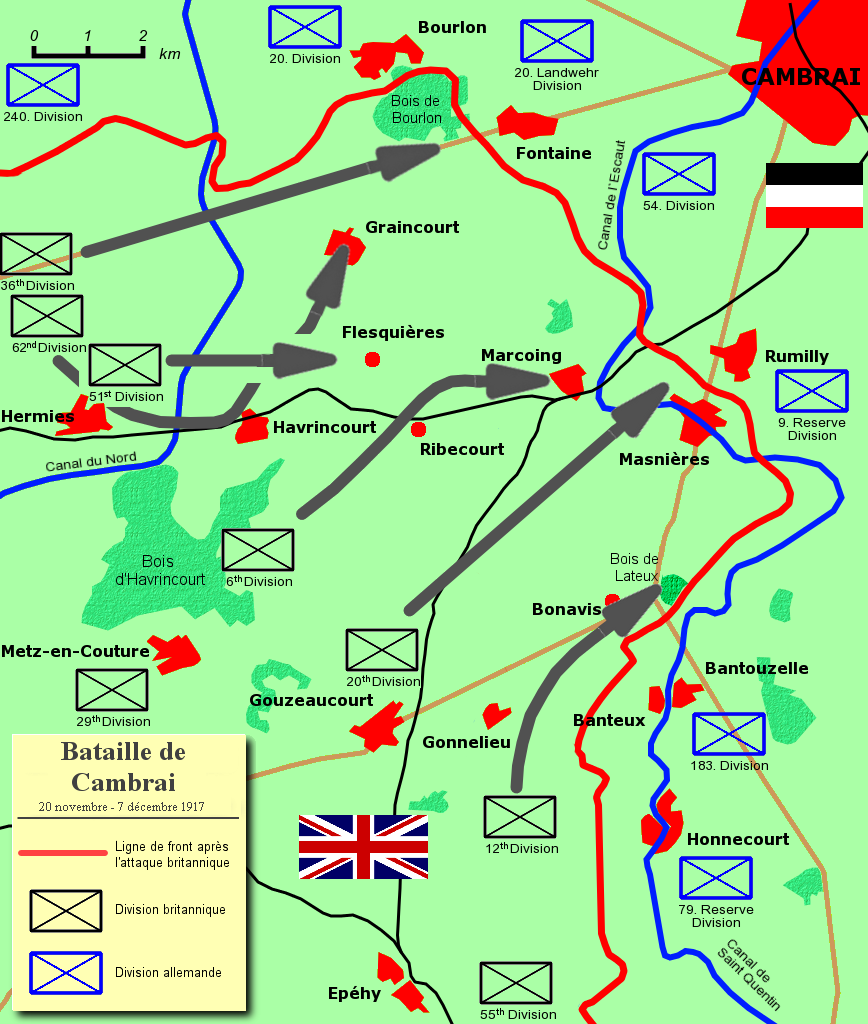
Map of the Battle of Cambrai, showing British gains from 20 November to the end of the month. The 20 November attack by the 51st Division on Flesquières is shown at upper left

Frustrated by the stalemate of trench warfare, the British had developed the tank as a weapon to break through German defensive lines. It was first deployed at the Battle of the Somme in September 1916 but was prone to bogging down in mud. Tank Corps commander Brigadier-General Hugh Elles proposed an attack on the firmer chalky ground near Cambrai, which had seen little fighting and whose ground was not cratered by shell holes. The German lines here were heavily fortified and, thought to be unlikely to be attacked, manned by units recovering from casualties suffered elsewhere on the front line. At 6:20 am on 20 November 1917, a British attack, preceded by a short artillery bombardment, was launched. It included 500 tanks and men from 8 infantry and 5 cavalry divisions. The attack was a success east of Flesquières, with the German line overrun and tanks pushing 5 miles (8 km) to the rear. At Flesquières, where the German line was protected by a ridge, Major-General George Harper, leading the 51st Highland Division, opted to keep his infantry back and sent the tanks forward unsupported. The tanks suffered heavily from German field artillery fire, with sixteen disabled.

Further advances were made elsewhere on the front on the following days but German reinforcements were rushed to Cambrai and counterattacks from 30 November reversed many of the territorial losses. The battle ended on 6 December. The British had taken little ground but showed that the tank could break the strongest of defensive lines.

== Myth ==
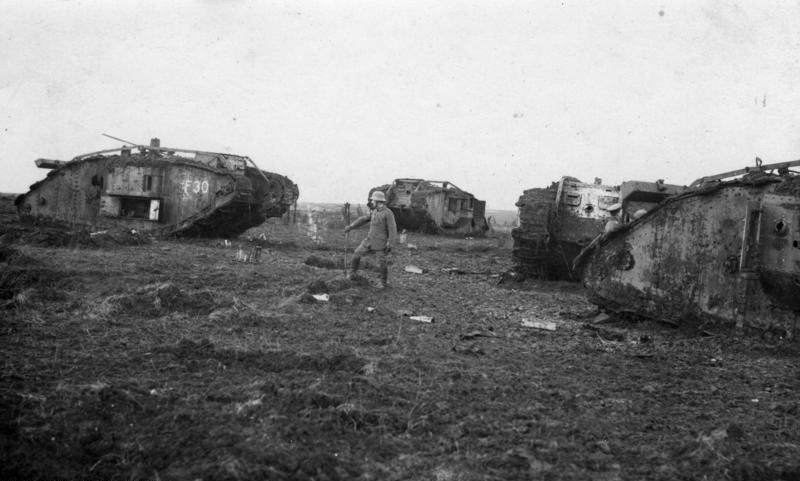
A German soldier at Cambrai with disabled British tanks

British Commander-in Chief Field Marshal Sir Douglas Haig thought that the failure to penetrate the German line at Flesquières had prevented a wider breakthrough that could have been exploited by his cavalry. He visited the battlefield on 22 November and saw 12 disabled British tanks. Haig was passed an eyewitness account that stated the tanks were taken out by a single German battery. The account stated that the artillerymen had fled from the tanks but a single German officer had stood firm and, gathering a few men, was able to man a gun and disable 8 or 9 British tanks. Other accounts stated that the officer manned the gun on his own and credit him with between 5 and 16 tank kills. The only account that claims to have witnessed the officer's body by a gun was by Captain Geoffrey Dugdale, a staff officer with 60th Brigade in the 20th (Light) Division, who viewed the captured German line on the afternoon of 20 November. He stated that "the first thing we came to was a German field battery, every gun out of action with the exception of one. By this was lying a single German officer, quite dead. In front of him were five tanks, which he had evidently succeeded in knocking out himself, single-handed, with his gun. A brave man". Dugdale's account was one of those passed to Haig. Dugdale's unit was stationed at Villers-Plouich, some 3 miles (5 km) south of Flesquières, though the story may have become associated with the latter place as it was where the greatest loss of British tanks was suffered. Even Dugdale's account gives no real evidence that the officer manned the gun alone, as his comrades could have withdrawn rather than be killed alongside him.

An account from an officer in the 1st battalion, Welsh Guards, on 24 November noted that their brigade commander ordered them to find the body of the German officer, stated here to be a major, and to bury it. Despite a search being carried out, the body could not be located.

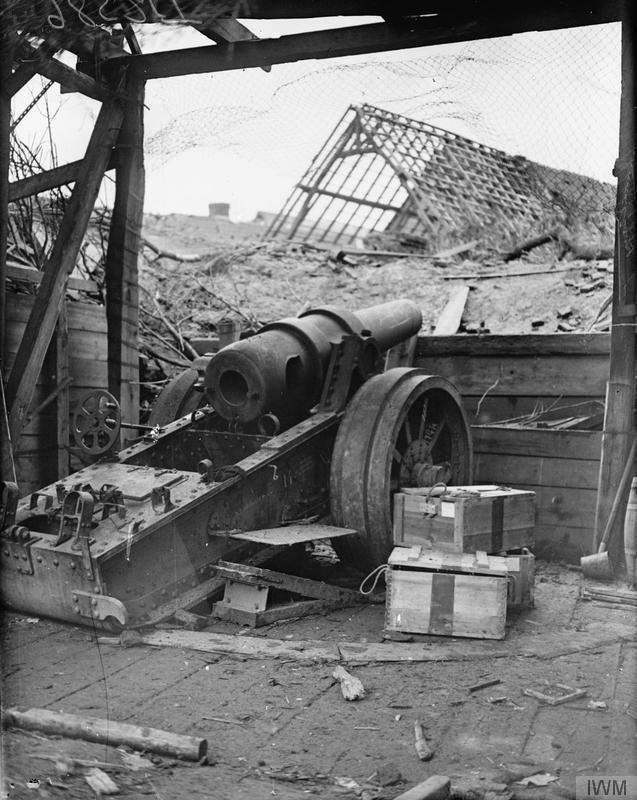
A captured German field artillery piece at Flesquières

Haig noted in his diary that the lone gunner could have accounted for at most nine tanks. However, he saw the story as a good reminder to his men of the importance of infantry operating in close cooperation with tanks to act as skirmishers to carry out reconnaissance and to clear German artillery positions.

The story gave Haig a convenient excuse for the lack of success at Flesquières and provided some comfort to the British tank crews who had failed to break through. In actuality, the opposing 54th Infantry Division had recently engaged in specific anti-tank training, which might explain its greater success in resisting the British attack than other German units.

Haig included the account of the lone gunner in his despatch on the battle, published in the London Gazette on 1 March 1918 and widely covered in contemporary newspapers. Haig presumably intended the story to explain the setback at Flesquières, though Major-General J. F. C. Fuller, who helped plan the attack, was annoyed that Haig had included it. Haig was also criticised for praising the bravery of the lone gunner without also commending that of his tank crews. It was also suggested that Haig's account could raise German morale and lead to the questioning of the military value of tanks, if so many could fall to a single artillery piece.

The capture of these two villages secured the flanks of the 51st (Highland) Division (T.), advancing on the left centre of our attack up the slopes of Flesquieres Hill against the German trench lines on the southern side of Flesquieres Village. Here very heavy fighting took place. The stout brick wall skirting the Chateau grounds opposed a formidable obstacle to our advance, while German machine guns swept the approaches.

A number of tanks were knocked out by direct hits from German field batteries in position beyond the crest of the hill. None the less, with the exception of the village itself, our second objectives in this area were gained before midday.

Many of the hits upon our tanks at Flesquieres were obtained by a German artillery officer who, remaining alone at his battery, served a field gun single-handed until killed at his gun. The great bravery of this officer aroused the admiration of all ranks!

— Field Marshal Sir Douglas Haig, extract from despatch of 20 February 1918, published in: "No. 30554". The London Gazette (Supplement). 1 March 1918. pp. 2717–2726.

== Legacy ==
After the war, the lone gunner story was recounted in many memoirs and histories, including Haig's intelligence chief Brigadier-General John Charteris's 1931 memoirs, Sir Arthur Conan Doyle's history of the Western Front (published 1916–1920) and Philip Gibbs's 1920 history of the war. Gibbs provides an account of a Highland soldier killing the lone gunner with a bayonet thrust, after saying "you're a brave man but you've got to dee [die]". Other accounts were the subject of British Army lectures in 1935 and in articles, written by Major Archibald Becke, in the Journal of the Royal Artillery.

Royal Flying Corps fighter ace James McCudden, VC wrote of the Cambrai offensive in his 1918 memoir Five Years in the Royal Flying Corps that "the advance was hung up at Flesquières by a Hun anti-tank gun which stopped a certain part of our line for twenty-four hours. When the anti-tank gunner was killed we were able to advance again. This gunner was found to be an officer, who, having had all his gun crew killed, worked the gun himself and knocked out fourteen tanks. One of our tank officers spoke very highly of the courage of this German officer. Of course, if the weather had been fine the anti-tank gun would have been spotted at once and knocked out by our low bombers, but the weather prevented the R.F.C. from taking a part in the proceedings and greatly hampered our advance".

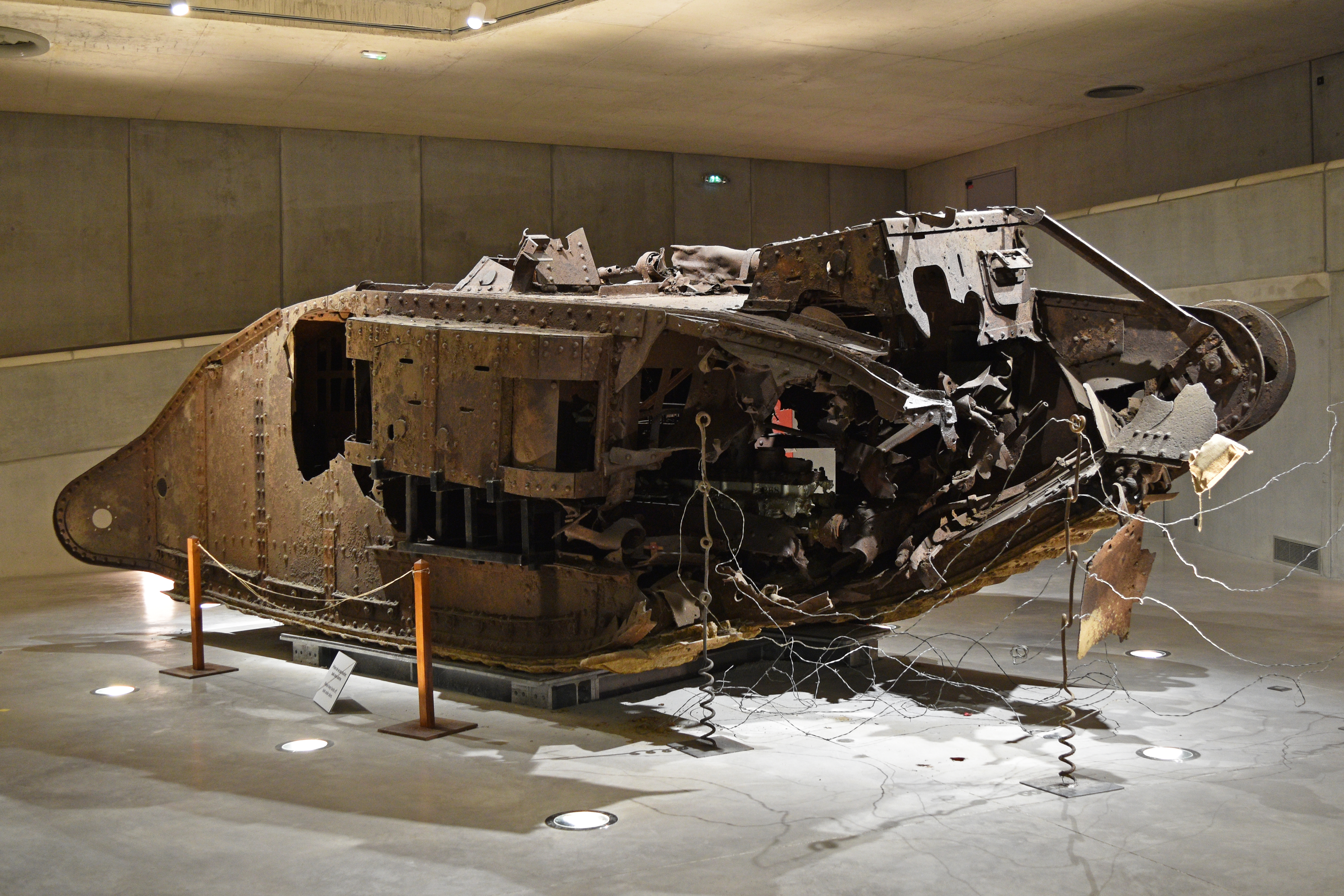
Deborah, a British tank destroyed by a German field gun on 20 November at Flesquières. Recovered in 1998 and now in the collection of the Cambrai Tank 1917 Museum.

In the post-war years, some British writers attempted to discredit the story. This included Tank Corps officer Major Frederick Hotblack, who had passed by the scene of action on 21 November and noted that the positions of the disabled tanks rendered it impossible for a single gun, or indeed a single battery of guns, to have accounted for them all. He notes that if any officer was found at the battery, he could well have been a wounded German infantry commander, carried to the relative safety of the gun position. Captain Wilfred Miles, author of the British government's official history of the Battle of Cambrai, attempted to resolve the matter. He found many conflicting accounts and noted an attempt by Elles to enquire into the incident, including liaison with the German official historian of the battle. Elles was unable to substantiate the story and Miles' history records it as a legend.

The Germans, particularly the Nazi Party, were keen to celebrate the lone gunner as an example of heroism in the German Army but struggled to identify the man as they had lost very few artillery officers on the first day of the battle. Official attention focused on the 108th Field Artillery Regiment, which had been posted to Flesquières. The lone gunner account was not mentioned in the 1919 history of the regiment by Lieutenant Erwin Zindler, though his personal memoir of 1929 included the action and attributed it to Unteroffizier Johannes Joachim Theodor Krüger of No. 8 Battery. Zindler was by then a fervent Nazi and his loyalty to the party and strong nationalism may have led to him falsely reporting on the action. Zindler admits that Krüger, as a non-commissioned officer, does not tally with the British accounts of a lone artillery officer but states that after discussions with the commander of No. 8 Battery, Lieutenant Behrmann, he was the only man who fit the circumstances. Krüger actually survived the battle, badly wounded by a gunshot, and was taken prisoner. He died in a British hospital near Dieppe on 10 December and was buried at Mont-Huon Military Cemetery. Kruger's artillery piece was located around 1 kilometre (0.6 mi) east of the Flesquières sugar refinery on the first day of the battle.

Zindler's attribution became widely accepted at the time and is recounted in later histories by both sides. The Old Comrades Association of the 108th Field Artillery Regiment disputed the attribution in 1931, suggesting instead that the lone gunner was Lieutenant Karl Müller of No. 9 Battery, who was killed in action on 20 November. Müller's battery claimed 12 tanks destroyed on 20 November, the most of any German battery that day, but was located at Marcoing, which lies some 2 miles (3 km) east of Flesquières. A memorial to the lone gunner was erected in Cologne in 1936. It was damaged by Allied bombing in the Second World War and removed by British engineers shortly afterwards. A barracks was named after Krüger in Kusel but has since closed.

The legend was the subject of blackened death metal band Kanonenfieber's song Panzerhenker (lit. Tank slayer) from their 2024 album Die Urkatastrophe.

== See also ==
- Angel of Mons
- Ghost of Kyiv, a mythical MiG-29 Fulcrum ace credited with shooting down multiple aircraft on the first day of the 2022 Russian invasion of Ukraine
- Colonel Tomb
- Lei Feng
