= Otto von Moser =

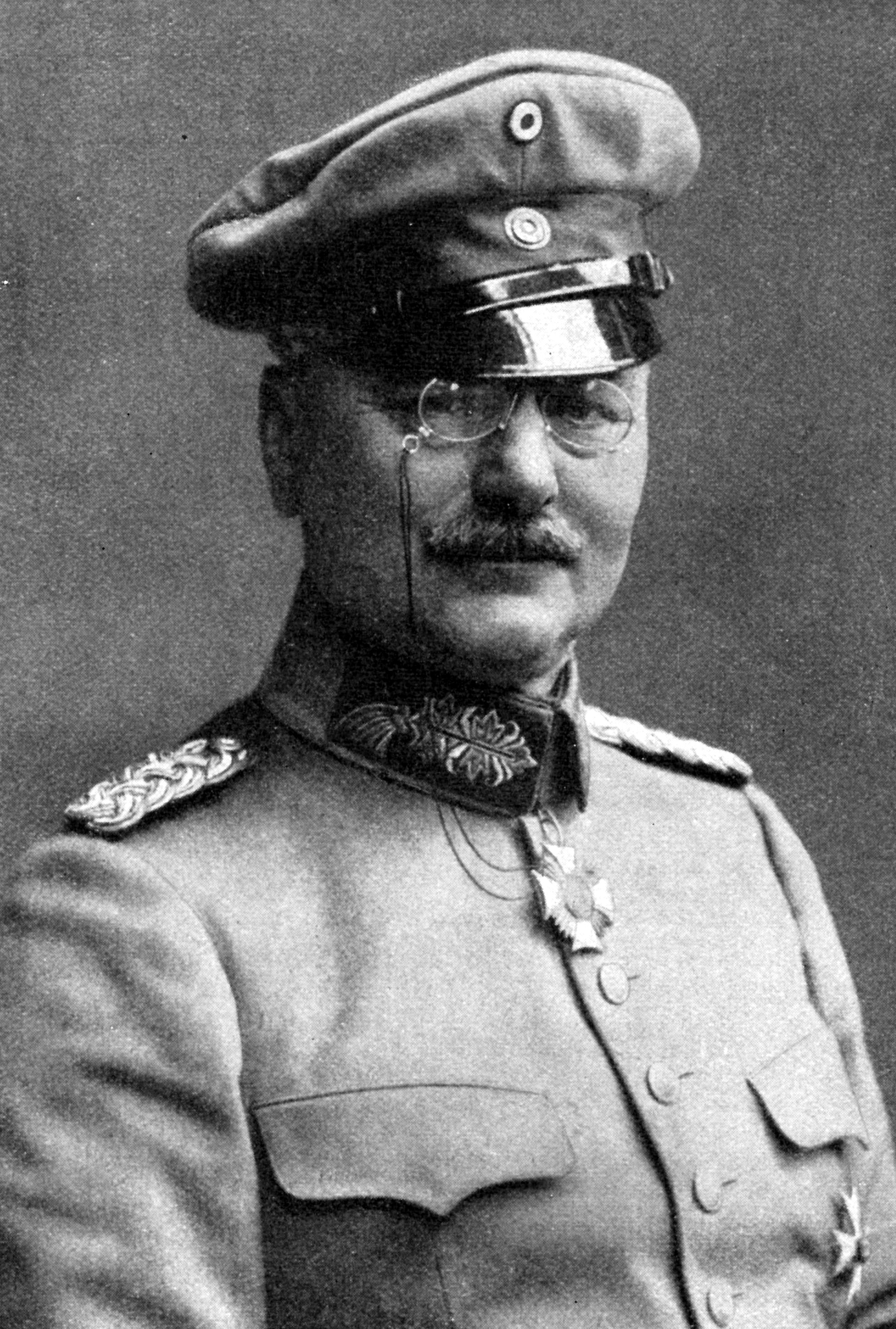
- Born: Otto Moser; 31 March 1860; Stuttgart, Kingdom of Württemberg
- Died: 11 October 1931 (aged 71); Isny im Allgäu, Württemberg, Germany
- Occupations: Army officer military historian

Otto von Moser (31 March 1860 – 11 October 1931) was a German army officer, originally from Stuttgart in Württemberg, who ended his army career as a lieutenant general. After the First World War he settled at Isny im Allgäu, near the frontier with Bavaria and embarked upon a career as a prolific military historian and author.

== Life ==
=== Provenance and early years ===
Otto Moser was the fifth son of Alwin Moser (1823–1906), whose professional career took him to the chairmanship of Deutsche Verlags-Anstalt, at Stuttgart. His mother was Auguste Moser (born Auguste Kleinlogel, 1827–1900). After five years at secondary school he enrolled, in 1874, in a Cadet Corps, first in Bensberg and later in Berlin. In 1877 he entered the 8th Württemberg Infantry Regiment ("Großherzog Friedrich von Baden" Nr. 126) as an ensign (Fähnrich). He was promoted to the rank of second lieutenant on 7 October, 1878.

=== Pre-war military career ===
In the late 19th century and before the First World War Otto Moser achieved rapid promotion up through the military hierarchy. From 31 July 1882 to 1 March 1883, he was sent to a military academy where he served as a teaching assistant. On 2 May 1884, he returned to his regiment where he was appointed an adjutant in a fusilier battalion, a capacity in which on 23 February 1889 he was promoted to the rank of a first lieutenant. For nearly three years, starting on 1 October 1889, he attended the Prussian Military Academy.

After this Moser was seconded to work with the German General Staff in Berlin for a year. Promotion to Hauptmann (captain) followed on 14 September 1893 and on 1 April 1894 he was given command of a company in the "Queen Olga" Grenadier Regiment" (first Württemberg) No. 119, where he remained until 12 September 1896 when he was transferred to the German General Staff. From there, as a First General Staff Officer, he moved on 18 November 1897 into the General Staff of the 27th Division (2nd Royal Württemberg).

Moser became a major on 13 September 1899 and served from 22 July 1900 to 27 February 1902 in the General Staff of the XVIII Army Corps, and then, till 23 April 1904, in the same position with the XIII (Royal Württemberg) Corps. Until 9 April 1906, Moser commanded the First Battalion in the "King of Prussia" Infantry Regiment (2nd Württemberg) No. 120. Following a promotion to the rank of lieutenant colonel, he briefly joined the staff of the "Grand Prince Frederick of Baden" (8th Württemberg) No. 126, before being sent back to the Prussian Military Academy as an instructor on 21 May 1906. Moser taught at the academy until November 1909, being promoted on 24 March 1909, to the rank of colonel and made a department head in the General Staff.

On 25 February 1908 King William II of Württemberg bestowed the Honour Cross of the Royal Order of Württemberg on him. The honour from the King of Württemberg was accompanied by automatic ennoblement and after 1908, sources refer to Otto Moser as Otto von Moser.

From 1 April 1910 till 12 September 1912 Moser served as commander of the "Old Württemberg" (3rd Württemberg) No. 121 Infantry Regiment, aged 52, he was promoted to major general and placed on immediate availability for service as an army officer.

=== First World War ===
With effect from 27 January 1913, Otto von Moser was appointed to the command of the 53rd Infantry Brigade (3rd Royal Württemberg), based in Ulm. (A lieutenant who joined his battalion in 1914, Erwin Rommel, later became one of Germany's most respected military commanders.) Moser was in command of the brigade at the outbreak of the First World War in July 1914. Moser was disabled by a severe shrapnel wound on 2 September 1914, at Romagne during the course of the Battle of Varennes–Montfaucon. On returning to duty on 25 May 1915, he was given a command of the 107th Division which was sent to fight on the Eastern Front. The division took part in the capture of Brest-Litovsk in August, before being switched to participate in the Serbian Campaign. Moser was promoted to the rank of lieutenant general on 18 August 1915 and on 13 June 1916 he was transferred to the Western Front, to command the 27th Division (2nd Royal Württemberg). On 12 March 1917 he was appointed to command the XIV Reserve Corps, fighting in the Battle of Arras and winning the Pour le Mérite, for his skill and leadership. At the end of November, during the Battle of Cambrai, the XIV Reserve Corps was surprised by the British offensive but held its positions in a costly defensive battle while groups to the south were forced back by the British.

=== Retirement ===
Moser retired due to exhaustion in February 1918, his retirement becoming permanent on 18 July. His retirement was marked with the award of the Military Merit Order. After the war Moser lived a short distance to the east of Lake Constance, on the Ludwigshöhe estate at Isny which he had inherited through his wife. He had already published several works on military history while still a serving officer, and his written output now increased. On 31 July 1927 the University of Tübingen celebrated his literary endeavours by awarding him an honorary doctorate. Moser applied the royalties from his book "Die Württemberger im Weltkriege" (1927), to set up in Isny a foundation with social objectives.

== Awards and decorations ==
This is a list of selected orders and decorations awarded to Moser.

- Pour le Mérite (26 April 1917)
- Order of the Red Eagle 2nd class with swords (7 February 1916)
- Order of the Prussian Crown 3rd class (7 February 1907)
- Iron Cross (1914) 1st and 2nd class (11 May 1915)
- Military Merit Order of Bavaria, 2nd class with star and swords (24 May 1917)
- Commander's Cross 1st class of the Albert Order with swords (24 May 1917)
- Commander's Cross 1st class of the Order of the Württemberg Crown with star and swords (5 September 1916)
- Commander's Cross 2nd class of the Order of the Zähringer Lion (17 September 1909)
- Commander's Cross of the Military Merit Order of Württemberg (18 July 1918)
- Grand Cross of the Friedrich Order with swords (20 April 1917)
- Knight's Cross 1st class of the Hessian Order of Philip the Magnanimous (25 April 1902)
- Hanseatic Cross of Hamburg (7 April 1916)
- War Merit Cross of Brunswick (8 March 1918)
- War Merit Cross of Lippe (1 June 1917)
- Commander's Cross of the Japanese Order of the Rising Sun (20 May 1911)
- Military Merit Cross of Austria-Hungary, 2nd class with war decoration (4 May 1916)
- Imtiaz Medal in silver (7 April 1916)
- Gallipoli Star (7 April 1916)
- Grand Cross of the Bulgarian Order of Military Merit (4 May 1918)

== Publications ==
- Kurzer strategischer Überblick über den Krieg 1870/71. Mittler-Verlag. Berlin 1908. OCLC 458230180.
- Die Führung des Armeekorps im Feldkriege. Mittler-Verlag. Berlin 1913. OCLC 719187118.
- Ausbildung und Führung des Bataillons, des Regiments und der Brigade. Gedanken und Vorschläge. Mittler-Verlag. Berlin 1914. OCLC 67339884.
- Kampf- und Siegestage 1914; Feldzugsaufzeichnungen eines höheren Offiziers. Mittler-Verlag. Berlin 1915. OCLC 21538110.
- Feldzugsaufzeichnungen 1914–1918 als Brigade-Divisionskommandeur und als Kommandierender General. Belser-Verlag. Stuttgart 1920. OCLC 5828572.
- Kurzer strategischer Überblick über den Weltkrieg 1914–1918. Mittler & Sohn Verlag. Berlin 1921. OCLC 185149124.
- Ernsthafte Plaudereien über den Weltkrieg; eine kritische, militär-politische Geschichte des Krieges für Fachleute und Nichtfachleute zur Rückschau in die Vergangenheit und zur Ausschau in die Zukunft. Belser-Verlag. Stuttgart 1925. OCLC 1321181.
- Das militärisch und politisch Wichtigste vom Weltkriege. Belser-Verlag. Stuttgart 1926. OCLC 251432888.
- Die Württemberger im Weltkriege: ein Geschichts-, Erinnerungs- und Volksbuch. Belser-Verlag. Stuttgart 1927. OCLC 23833653.
- Die obersten Gewalten im Weltkrieg; das Werk der Staatsmänner, Heerführer, Parlaments-, Presse- und Volksführer bei der Entente und bei den Mittelmächten. Belser-Verlag. Stuttgart 1931. OCLC 3980987
- Der Weltkrieg und die akademische Jugend der Nachkriegszeit: ein offenes Wort. Belser-Verlag. Stuttgart 1929. OCLC 923914121.
