= Henry Tandey =

Recipient of the Victoria Cross

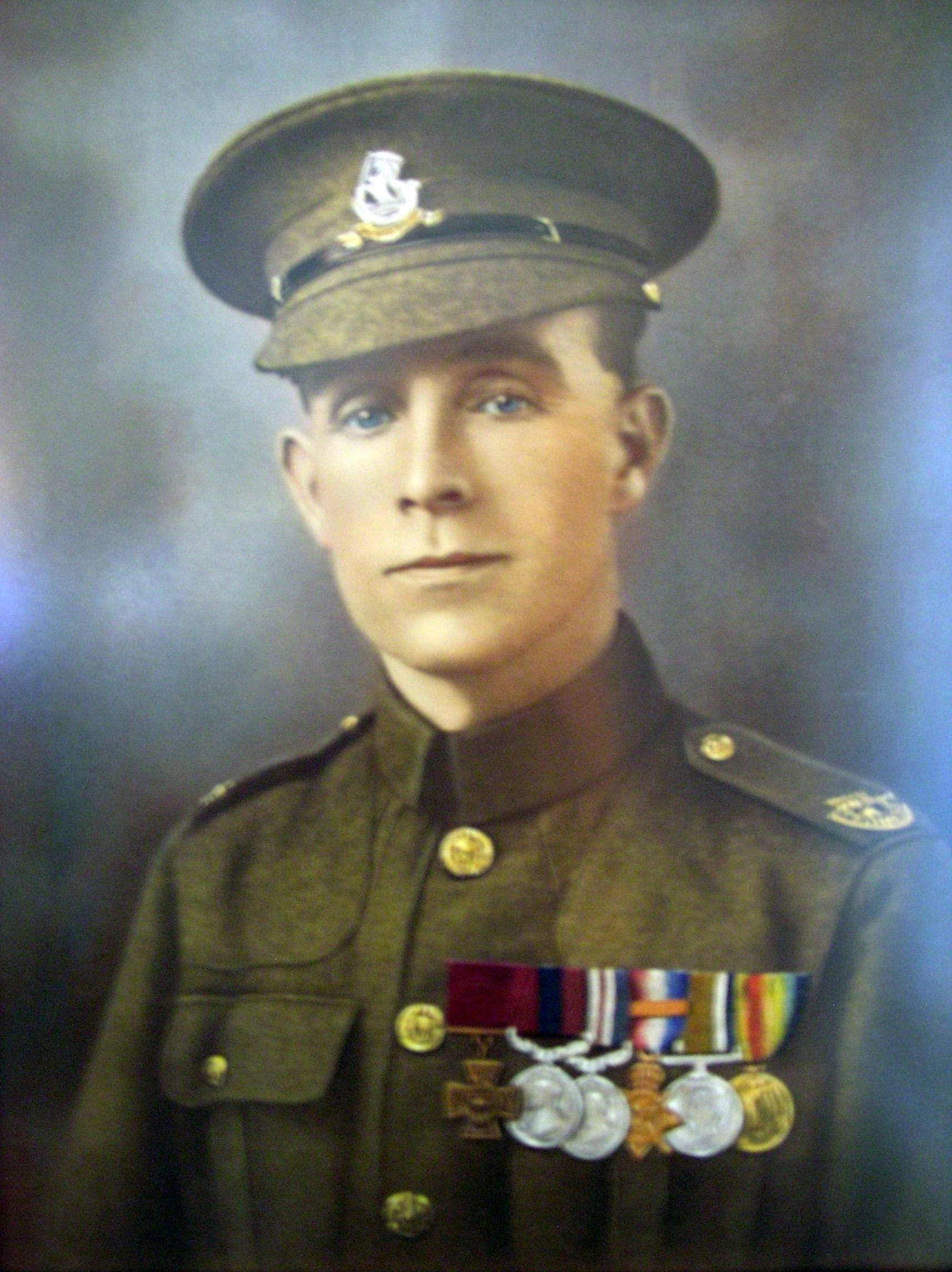
- Private Henry Tandey
- Born: Henry James Tandy; 30 August 1891; Leamington, Warwickshire, England
- Died: 20 December 1977 (aged 86); Coventry, West Midlands, England
- Military career
- Allegiance: United Kingdom
- Branch: British Army
- Service years: 1910–1926
- Rank: Lance Corporal
- Nickname: "Napper"
- Service number: 34506
- Units: The Yorkshire Regiment (Green Howards) (1910–18); West Riding Regiment (Duke of Wellington's Regiment) (1918–26)
- Conflicts: First World War; First Battle of Ypres; Battle of the Somme (WIA); Battle of Passchendaele (WIA)
- Awards: Victoria Cross; Distinguished Conduct Medal; Military Medal; Mentioned in Despatches (5)

Henry James Tandey, VC, DCM, MM (born Tandy, 30 August 1891 – 20 December 1977) was a British soldier and a recipient of the Victoria Cross, (Note: Awarded on 13 December 1918. As published in issue/supplement 31067 on the London Gazette in page 14,773 of that date.) the highest award for gallantry in the face of the enemy that can be awarded to British and Commonwealth forces. He was the second most highly decorated British private of the First World War and is most commonly remembered as the soldier who allegedly spared Adolf Hitler's life near the end of the war. Born with the family name of Tandy, he later changed his surname to Tandey after problems with his father, and because of this, some military records have a different spelling of his name.

== Early life ==
Henry James Tandey was born at the Angel Hotel, Regent Street, Leamington, Warwickshire, the son of a former soldier whose wife had died early in their child's life. He attended St Peter's primary school in Augusta Place, Leamington. He also spent part of his childhood in an orphanage before becoming a boiler attendant at a hotel.

== Military service ==
Tandey enlisted into the Green Howards on 12 August 1910. After basic training he was posted to the 2nd Battalion of the regiment on 23 January 1911, serving with them in Guernsey and South Africa prior to the outbreak of World War I. He took part in the Battle of Ypres in October 1914, and was wounded on 24 October 1916, at the Battle of the Somme. On discharge from hospital he was posted to the 3rd Battalion on 5 May 1917, before moving to the 9th Battalion on 11 June 1917. He was wounded a second time on 27 November 1917, during the Battle of Passchendaele. After his second period of hospital treatment he returned to the 3rd Battalion, on 23 January 1918, before being posted to the 12th Battalion on 15 March 1918, where he remained until 26 July 1918. On 26 July 1918 Tandey transferred from the Green Howards to The Duke of Wellington's (West Riding Regiment). He was posted to their 5th Battalion on 27 July 1918.

=== Distinguished Conduct Medal ===
On 28 August 1918, during the Second Battle of Cambrai, the 5th Battalion was in action to the west of the Canal du Nord. Tandey was in charge of one of several bombing parties on the German trenches. As the forward parties were being held up Tandey took two men and dashed across open ground (No man's land) under fire and bombed a trench. He returned with twenty prisoners. This action led to the capture of the German positions and Tandey was awarded the Distinguished Conduct Medal (DCM) on 5 December 1918, the citation read:

34506 Pte. H. Tandey, 5th Bn., W. Rid. R.

(T.F.) (Leamington).

He was in charge of a reserve bombing party in action, and finding the advance temporarily held up, he called on two other men of his party, and working across the open in rear of the enemy, he rushed a post, returning with twenty prisoners, having killed several of the enemy. He was an example of daring courage throughout the whole of the operations.

On 12 September, the 5th Battalion was involved in an attack at Havrincourt, where Tandey again distinguished himself. Having rescued several wounded men under fire the previous day, Tandey again led a bombing party into the German trenches, returning with more prisoners. For this action Tandey was awarded the Military Medal (MM) on 13 March 1919.

=== Victoria Cross ===
Tandey was 27 years old and a private in the 5th Battalion Duke of Wellington's (West Riding) Regiment when he performed the actions which earned him the Victoria Cross (VC).

On 28 September 1918, during a counter-attack at the canal, following the capture of Marcoing, France, his platoon was stopped by machine-gun fire. Tandey crawled forward, located the gun position and with a Lewis gun team, silenced it. Reaching the canal crossing, he restored the plank bridge under heavy fire. In the evening, he and eight comrades were surrounded by an overwhelming number of the enemy. Tandey led a bayonet charge, fighting so fiercely that 37 of the enemy were driven into the hands of the remainder of his company. Although twice wounded, Tandey refused to leave until the fight was won, eventually going into hospital for the third time on 4 October 1918.

An eyewitness, Private H Lister, recounted the episode:

On 28th September 1918 during the taking of the crossing over the Canal de St. Quentin at Marcoing, I was No.1 of the Lewis gun team of my platoon. I witnessed the whole of the gallantry of Private Tandey throughout the day. Under intensely heavy fire he crawled forward in the village when we were held up by the enemy MG and found where it was, and then led myself and comrades with the gun into a house from where we were able to bring Lewis gun fire on the MG and knock it out of action. Later when we got to the canal crossings and the bridge was down, Pte Tandey, under the fiercest of aimed MG fire went forward and replaced planks over the bad part of the bridge to enable us all to cross without delay, which would otherwise have ensued. On the same evening when we made another attack we were completely surrounded by Germans, and we thought the position might be lost. Pte Tandey, without hesitation, though he was twice wounded very nastily, took the leading part in our bayonet charge on the enemy, to get clear. Though absolutely faint he refused to leave us until we had completely finished our job, collected our prisoners and restored the line.

His VC was gazetted on 14 December 1918, the citation read:

No. 34506 Pte. Henry Tandey, D.C.M., M.M., 5th Bn., W. Rid. R. (T.F.) (Leamington).

For most conspicuous bravery and initiative during the capture of the village and the crossings at Marcoing, and the subsequent counter-attack on 28 September, 1918. When, during the advance on Marcoing, his platoon was held up by machine-gun fire, he at once crawled forward, located the machine gun, and, with a Lewis gun team, knocked it out. On arrival at the crossings he restored the plank bridge under a hail of bullets, thus enabling the first crossing to be made at this vital spot.

Later in the evening, during an attack, he, with eight comrades, was surrounded by an overwhelming number of Germans, and though the position was apparently hopeless, he led a bayonet charge through them, fighting so fiercely that 37 of the enemy were driven into the hands of the remainder of his company.

Although twice wounded, he refused to leave till the fight was won.

=== Alleged encounter with Adolf Hitler ===
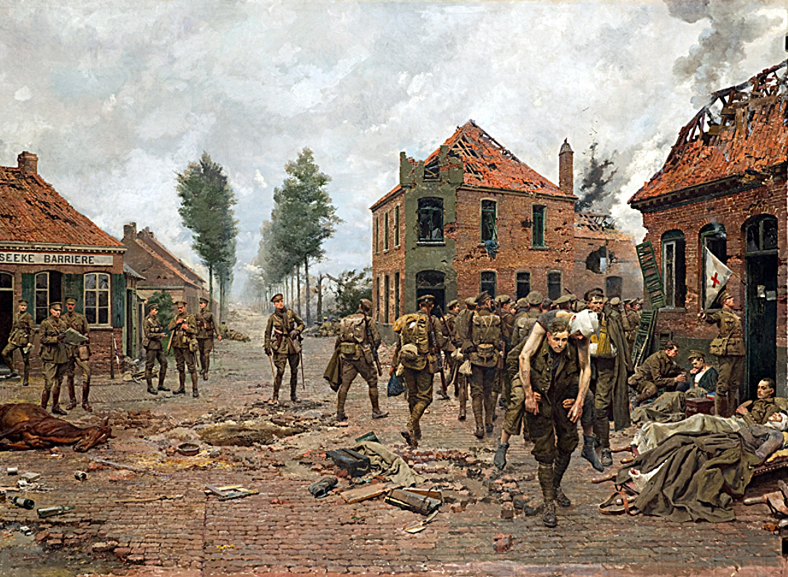
Fortunino Matania painting inspired by the accounts of Tandey's regiment, later appropriated by Nazi dictator Adolf Hitler

Although disputed, Tandey allegedly encountered Adolf Hitler at the French village of Marcoing on 28 September 1918, while Tandey was serving with the 5th Duke of Wellington's Regiment. That day, Tandey took part in a battle for which he would be awarded the VC for bravery. As the battle neared its end, a wounded German soldier wandered into Tandey's line of fire and he chose not to shoot. The German soldier saw him lower his rifle and nodded his thanks before wandering off. Although Tandey reputedly commonly spared wounded and disarmed German soldiers, the soldier from that day is dubiously claimed to have been Hitler. Hitler, however, took his second leave from military service from 10 to 28 September 1918, indicating that he was still in Germany at the time. Tandey was decorated with the VC in late 1919, after which reports of the ceremony circulated with a picture of Tandey carrying a wounded soldier during the First Battle of Ypres (1914), which Hitler may have become aware of.

In 1923, the Green Howards Regiment commissioned a painting from Fortunino Matania, showing a soldier purported to be Tandey carrying a wounded man at the Kruiseke Crossroads (northwest of Menin) in 1914. The painting was made from a sketch, provided to Matania by the regiment, based on an event at that crossroads. A building shown behind Tandey in the painting belonged to the Van Den Broucke family, to whom the regiment presented a copy of the painting.

In 1937, Hitler became aware of the Matania painting, a copy of it being owned by Dr. Otto Schwend, a member of Hitler's staff. Schwend had been a medical officer during the 1914 Battle of Ypres and in 1936 had been sent a copy of the painting by a Lieutenant Colonel Earle, whom Schwend had treated in a medical post at the Menin Crossroads; the pair stayed in touch after the war. Schwend gave a large photograph of the painting to Hitler, who purportedly identified the soldier carrying the wounded man as Tandey from the photo of him in the 1918 newspaper. Hitler's adjutant, Captain Fritz Wiedemann, wrote Schwend in response:

I beg to acknowledge your friendly gift which has been sent to Berlin through the good offices of Dr. Schwend. The Führer is naturally very interested in things connected with his own war experiences, and he was obviously moved when I showed him the photograph and explained the thought which you had in causing it to be sent to him. He was obviously moved when I showed him the picture. He has directed me to send you his best thanks for your friendly gift which is so rich in memories.

In 1938, British Prime Minister Neville Chamberlain visited Hitler at the Berghof for talks that led to the Munich Agreement, noticed the painting and asked about it. Hitler replied:

That man came so near to killing me that I thought I should never see Germany again; Providence saved me from such devilishly accurate fire as those English boys were aiming at us.

Hitler reputedly asked Chamberlain to give Tandey his best wishes and gratitude. Chamberlain promised to phone Tandey upon his return. Supposedly, the phone was answered by the nine-year-old William Whateley, a relative of Tandey's wife Edith. The records related to the 1938 meeting at the Cadbury Research Centre (which holds copies of Chamberlain's papers and diaries) do not reference Tandey, who at the time lived at 22 Cope Street, Coventry, and worked for the Triumph Motor Company. Neither that company nor British Telecommunications record a telephone line registered to Tandey's address in 1938.

=== Post-war service ===
On 13 March 1919 a supplement to The London Gazette announced that Tandey had been awarded the Military Medal (MM). The following day he was discharged from service and only one day later he re-enlisted back into the Duke of Wellington's Regiment, with the 3rd Battalion on a 'Short Service Engagement'. Three days later (18 March 1919) he was promoted to acting lance corporal. He remained with the 3rd Battalion on 'Home Service' until 4 February 1921, when he transferred to the 2nd Battalion. Four days later on 8 February 1921 he requested to revert to the rank of private.

Tandey served with the 2nd Battalion in Gibraltar from 11 April 1922 to 18 February 1923, in Turkey from 19 February – 23 August 1923 and finally in Egypt from 24 August 1923 until 29 September 1925. He was finally discharged from the army on 5 January 1926.

In addition to his major awards Tandey had also been Mentioned in Despatches on five occasions. He was personally decorated by King George V at Buckingham Palace on 17 December 1919.

== Post-war years ==
Tandey returned to Leamington Spa and married. In 1940, during the Coventry Blitz, his home was bombed by the Luftwaffe. Tandey is reported to have rescued many people from their burning homes during the Blitz of Coventry, often carrying people out of the homes over his shoulder. A journalist approached him outside his bombed Coventry home, asking him about his alleged encounter with Hitler. "If only I had known what he would turn out to be," Tandey is allegedly quoted as saying. "When I saw all the people and women and children he had killed and wounded I was sorry to God I let him go." However, there is no evidence, not even anecdotal, he was either hounded or avoided after the claims.

Tandey became a commissionaire at the Standard Triumph Works, Fletchamstead a position he held for 38 years. Tandey died in 1977, childless, at the age of 86. At his request, he was cremated and his ashes buried in the Masnieres British Cemetery at Marcoing, France, on 23 May 1978, by his undertaker Pargetter and Son. Due to French laws it was not permissible for his ashes to be scattered, or any form of ceremony or commemoration made to him. Henry Tandey Court, in Union Road, in Leamington Spa, is named after him. It was originally a workshop and builders yard of Mr. G.F.Smith, who built St. Mark's Church and Vicarage. A blue plaque was installed outside the Angel Hotel where Henry Tandey was born and at St Peter's School.

== Medals ==
Tandey donated his medals to the Duke of Wellington's Regiment Museum in Halifax, West Yorkshire. On special occasions and parades he would sign them out to wear. During the last period that he had signed them out, he died. Unaware that the medals should have been returned to the museum, the medals were auctioned at Sotheby's in London by his wife and a private collector subsequently purchased them. They were presented to the Green Howards Regimental Museum (the regiment in which he had earlier served), by Sir Ernest Harrison OBE, at a ceremony in the Tower of London on 11 November 1997, twenty years after Tandey died.

A copy of Tandey's Victoria Cross is now displayed at the Green Howards Regimental Museum in Richmond, North Yorkshire. Along with others, the original VC is kept in a local bank vault.

On 6 June 2006 The Green Howards and the Duke of Wellington's (West Riding) Regiment amalgamated with the Prince of Wales's Own Regiment of Yorkshire to form the Yorkshire Regiment.

Ribbon	Description	Notes
	Victoria Cross (VC)	14 December 1918
	Distinguished Conduct Medal (DCM)	5 December 1918
	Military Medal (MM)	13 March 1919
	1914 Star	With Clasp "5 Aug – 22 Nov 1914"
	British War Medal	
	Victory Medal	With Mentioned in despatches Oakleaf
	Defence Medal	Awarded for his Service as an Air Raid Warden in Coventry during the Blitz.
	King George VI Coronation Medal	1937 – Given to all living recipients of the Victoria Cross.
	Queen Elizabeth II Coronation Medal	1953 – Given to all living recipients of the Victoria Cross and the George Cross.
	Queen Elizabeth II Silver Jubilee Medal	1977 – Given to all living recipients of the Victoria Cross and the George Cross.

== Sources ==
- Monuments to Courage (David Harvey, 1999)
- The Register of the Victoria Cross (This England, 1997)
- Gliddon, Gerald (2000). VCs of the First World War – The Final Days 1918. Sutton Publishing. ISBN 0-7509-2485-3.
- Johnson, David (2012). One Soldier And Hitler, 1918. Gloucestershire: The History Press. ISBN 978-0-7524-6613-2.
