= Achiet–Marcoing railway =

Railway in Hauts-de-France

Achiet to Marcoing Railway
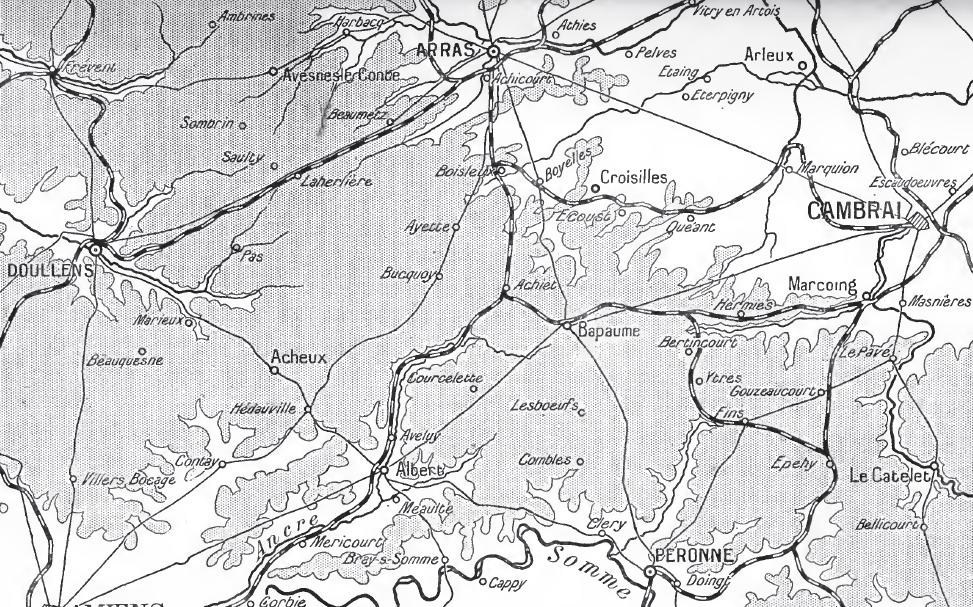
- The line starts in the center of the map. It ends at Marcoing, just south of Cambrai.

Overview
- Status: Defunct
- Owner: GIE Expl. Ferr. de Bapaume - 1999
- Locale: France (Nord, Pas-de-Calais )
- Termini: Achiet-le-Grand; Marcoing

History
- Opened: 1871-1878
- Closed: 1969-1999

Technical
- Line length: 33 km (21 mi)
- Number of tracks: Single track
- Track gauge: 1,435 mm (4 ft 8 1/2 in) standard gauge

The Achiet to Marcoing Railway was a secondary line of standard gauge railway in Hauts-de-France. The first section opened in 1871. The last section of the line was closed down in 1999.

== History ==
=== Foundation ===
The plans for a railway from Achiet-le-Grand to Bapaume date back to the early 1860s. However, in these plans the section was part of a larger plan to improve the connections of the Nord-Pas de Calais Mining Basin by making a more direct connection between Arras / Achiet and Noyon to the south. This plan was not executed.

On 21 July 1866 three notable businessmen of Bapaume contracted with their municipality for constructing a railway to connect Bapaume to the French railway system. The businessmen were Messrs. Edouard Arrachart, owner of a chemical plant; Edouard Grardel, textiles manufacturer; and banker Florimond Parel. The contract was called a concession. The municipality subsidized the line and in exchange the company would offer service on certain conditions, fare price etc.

In August 1867 the department Pas-de-Calais agreed with the plans. On 30 May 1868 the construction of the railway was declared to be in public interest.

The line was opened in sections:

- 1871: Achiet - Bapaume 7 km, closed down 1999
- 1877: Bapaume - Havrincourt 18 km closed down 1969
- 1878: Havrincourt - Marcoing 8 km closed down 1969

=== Significance ===
The section from Achiet to Bapaume served the general interests of the town. In the 1880s it had a traffic of 70-80 cars a day. Most of them to or from destinations further away than Achiet. This explains the standard gauge. However, the rail was light, so trains could not travel at more than 45 km/h.

The section from Bapaume to Marcoing had been primarily constructed in the interests of the local beet sugar factories and distilleries. The state had given a subsidy of 125,000 francs for the Achiet–Marcoing railway. Others, mainly manufacturers, subsidized it for 376,253 francs. In a primarily agricultural and sugar area, the secondary lines allowed a spectacular development of the cultivation of sugar beet and flax. This had to do with the very high cost of transporting heavy cargo like sugar beet by road.

In the 1880s none of the local industries had its own branch, which would of course allow direct use of railway cars instead of using them via transloading with wagons and carts. Later, the line had several branches to serve important local industries, like Sucrerie Lejosne in Bihucourt and the Gagny factory in Bapaume.

=== Operators ===
- Chemin de fer d’Achiet à Bapaume (A.B.) 1871-1930
- Compagnie Générale de chemin de fer d'Intérêt Local (CGL) 1930-1961
- Régie départementale du Pas-de-Calais 1961-1969
- GIE Exploitation Ferroviaire de Bapaume 1969-1999

== Stations ==
Achiet-le-Grand (km 0); Bihucourt (km 3), arrêt; Biefvillers-lès-Bapaume (km 5), arrêt; Bapaume (km 7); Frémicourt (km 12), halte; Beugny (km 14); Vélu (km 17); Hermies (km 21); Havrincourt (km 25); Flesquières - Ribécourt (km 28); Marcoing (km 33).

The station at Bapaume also had the repair shop of the railway company. It also did repairs for the line from Boisleux to Marquion, and that from Vélu to Saint-Quentin.

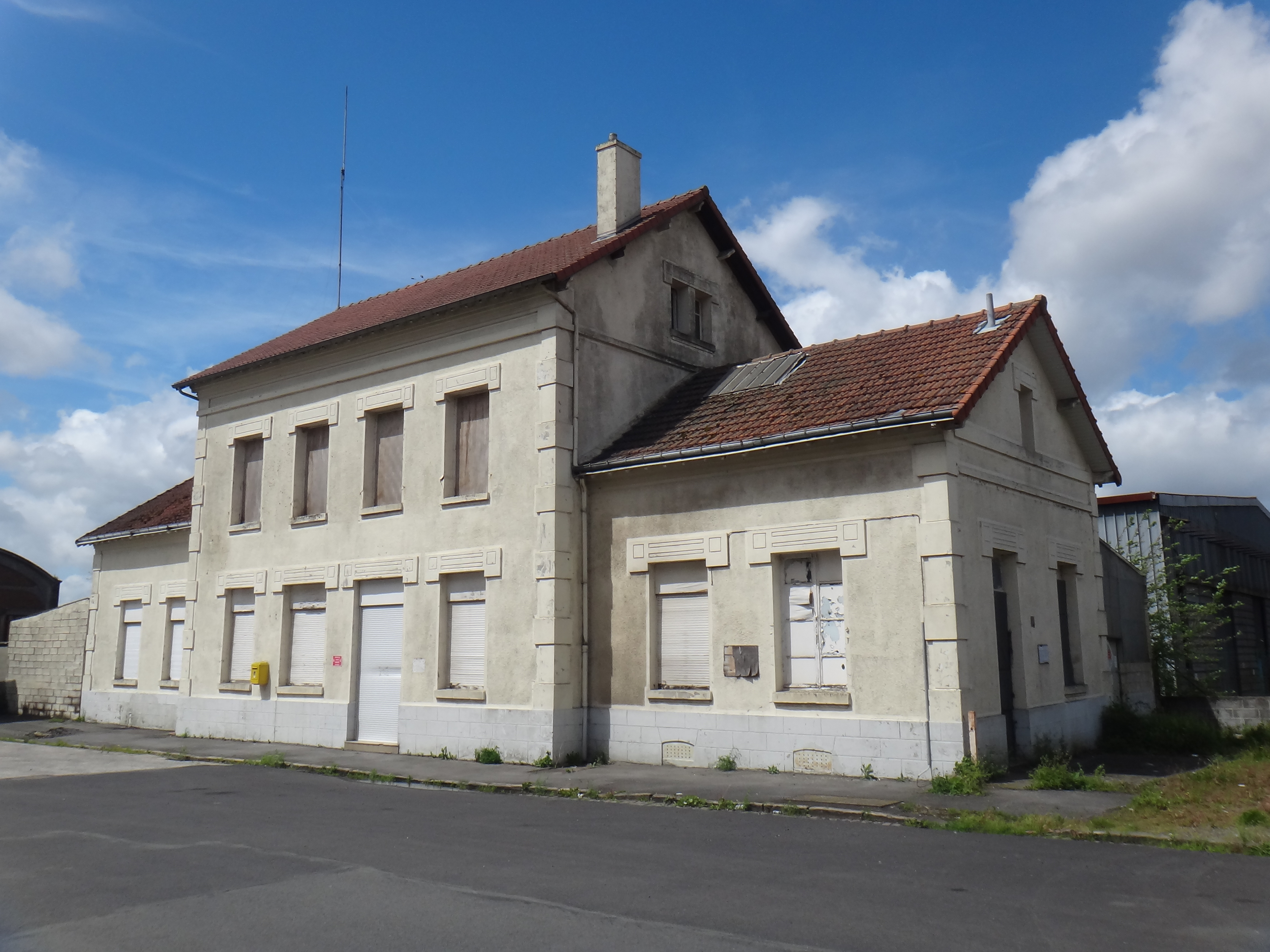
Former railway station of Bapaume in May 2014.

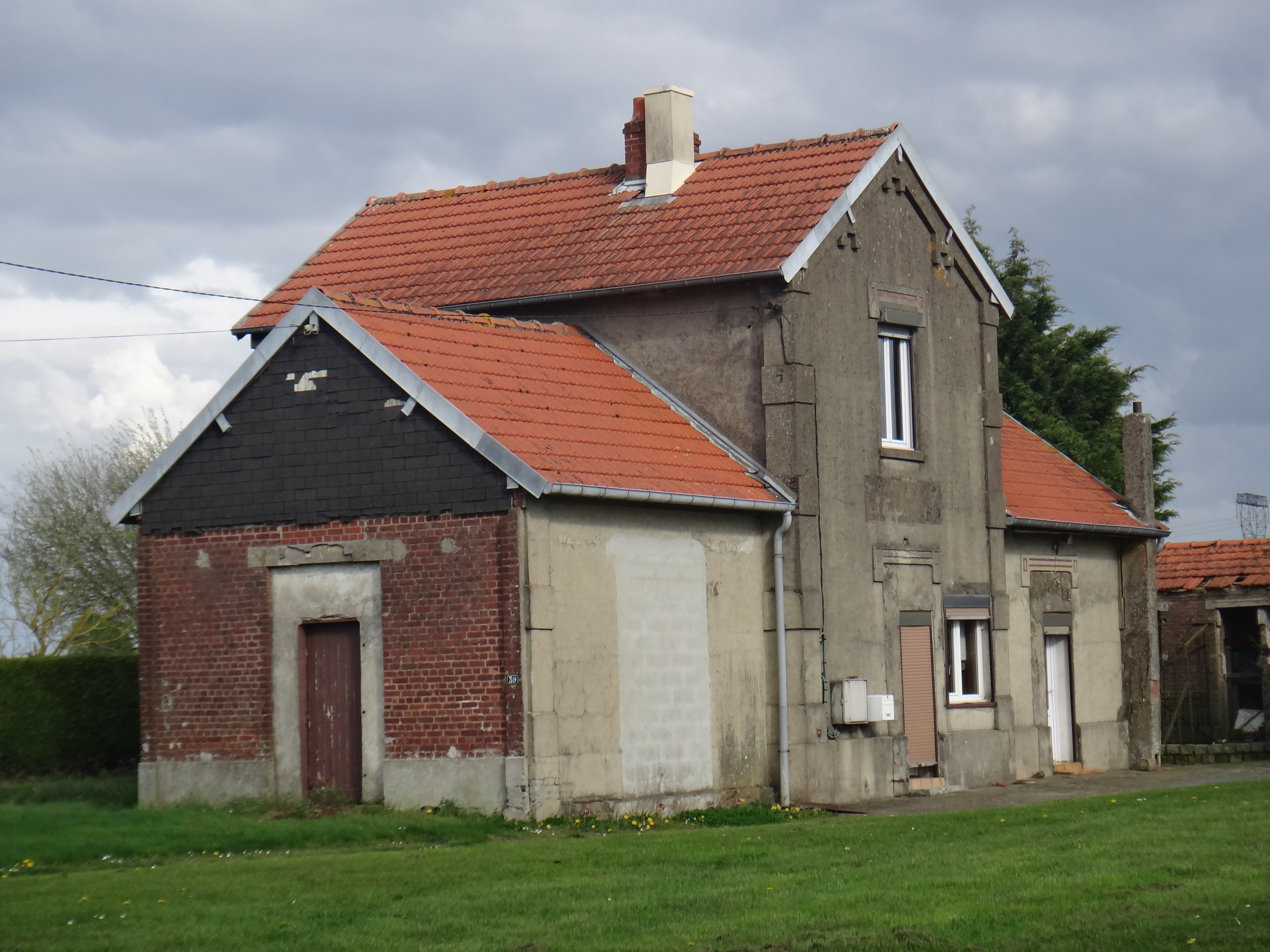
The railway station of Beugny in April 2017. Part is now a house.

== Sources ==
- "Pas de Calais (62)". FACS Patrimoine Ferroviaire.
- Bulletin des lois de l'empire français, vol. XXXXI, Imprimerie imperiale, Paris, 1868, pp. 737–753
- Chemin de fer d'Achiet a Noyon par Bapaume, Péronne et Ham, Avant-Projet, Imprimerie imperiale, Paris, 1863
- Sampité, A. (1888), Les chemins de fer a faible trafic en France: lignes secondaires, Librairie Polytechnique, Baudry et Cie, Paris
