= Havrincourt =

- Commune
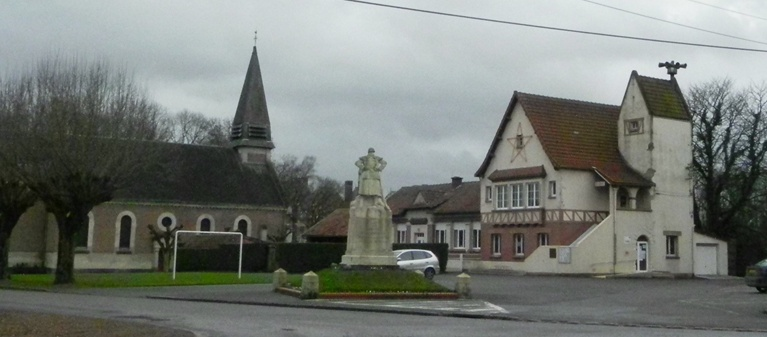
- The centre of Havrincourt

- Coat of arms
- Location of Havrincourt
- Location within France Location within Hauts-de-France
- Coordinates: 50°06′43″N 3°05′13″E
- Country: France
- Region: Hauts-de-France
- Department: Pas-de-Calais
- Arrondissement: Arras
- Canton: Bapaume
- Intercommunality: CC Sud-Artois
- Area^{1}: 17 km^{2} (6.6 sq mi)
- Elevation: 113 m (371 ft)
- Highest elevation: 132 m (433 ft)
- Lowest elevation: 67 m (220 ft)
- Population (2023): 351
  - Density: 21/km^{2} (53/sq mi)
- Time zone: UTC+01:00 (CET)
  - Summer (DST): UTC+02:00 (CEST)
- INSEE/Postal code: 62421 /62147
- ^{1} French Land Register data, which excludes lakes, ponds, glaciers > 1 km^{2} (0.386 sq mi or 247 acres) and river estuaries.

Havrincourt (French pronunciation: [avʁɛ̃kuʁ]) is a commune in the Pas-de-Calais department in Hauts-de-France in France. The inhabitants are called Havrincourtois.

== Situation ==
The village lies about 14 kilometres south-west of Cambrai near the Havrincourt service area on the Autoroute A2. It is in the south-east corner of Pas-de-Calais, near to both the Nord and the Somme départements.

It stands on the Upper Cretaceous plateau of the Artesian anticline, between the Somme at Péronne and the Escaut at Cambrai.

In this satellite photograph Cambrai is top right. The dark patch down left of centre is the Bois d'Havrincourt. The Canal du Nord runs northwards from there and the Autoroute A2 goes diagonally. The village lies north-east of the wood and the A26 runs in curves from north to south of the picture. To the east of that, the Canal de Saint-Quentin winds from Cambrai to the south of the picture. The chalk soil of the plateau shows pale in the fields. If you know where to look, it is just possible to detect the soil disturbance around the Hindenburg Line.

== Communications ==
Havrincourt is close to the A2 - A26 motorway interchange which leads to south and north-going junctions of the A1. Three motorway access points are distant about 12 km (7.5 mi) from the village. The Canal du Nord passes through the western edge of the commune.

In 1877 a railroad section from Bapaume to Havrincourt opened. This was later extended to Marcoing. The Achiet–Marcoing railway primarily served the sugar industry. The railroad connections to Havrincourt closed down in 1969.

== Economy and village life ==
The commune produces cereals, endives, and beet. Livestock raised includes poultry and beef. Timber is harvested from the wood. There is a camping and caravan site.

The village holds a festival on the Sunday nearest 24 June. Sports pursued are shooting and fishing and there is a village hall.

== History ==
In 1125 it was referred to as Haverencort. The barony of Havrincourt was promoted to a marquisate in 1693. The Cardevacque d'Havrincourt family then played a prominent role during the French Régence period (1715–1723).

The construction of the Canal du Nord had reached the commune in 1914 when the First World War broke out. In the winter of 1916-17, its incomplete earthworks were here incorporated into the defences of the Hindenburg Line, the main or front line of which ran right through the village. As a consequence, the commune was the scene of two battles each of which was in its own way, significant in the history of the war.

In November 1917, the Hindenburg Main Line (Siegfried Stellung) ran through the village. The taking of Havrincourt was part of the opening phase of the Battle of Cambrai (1917), when tanks were used in a coordinated way for the first time. On the night of 19–20 November, soldiers of British 62nd (2nd West Riding) Division prepared for the event in Havrincourt Wood. The motorway now passes through the part which in 1917 had been felled as part of the front of the Hindenburg Line and was occupied by an artillery battery. The Tank Corps mustered behind the battery, in the south-west corner of the wood. The infantry battalions present were the 2/5th, 2/6th, 2/7th (Leeds Rifles) and 2/8th (Leeds Rifles) Bns West Yorkshire Regiment, 2/4th and 2/5th Bns KOYLI, 2/4th and 2/5th Bns York and Lancaster Regiment.

The second battle was the Battle of Havrincourt, opening on 12 September 1918, which was significant because it began the German retreat back to the Belgian border with France. Arrival in that vicinity coincided with the implementation of The Armistice. At Havrincourt, on 12 September, 62nd Division was again present, this time with the New Zealand Division.

The commune was awarded the French Croix de Guerre on 23 September 1920.

== Heritage ==
There are no really old buildings as everything was destroyed by the establishment of the Hindenburg Line and the two battles, particularly that of 1917. However, the château was rebuilt by 1925 in the style of the periods of Henri IV and Louis XIII (1589–1643), the equivalent of the English Jacobean. It consists of five adjoining blocks of building each with a steeply pitched roof.

The church of St Géry too, was rebuilt after 1918. It includes seven grave slabs of the Cardevacque d'Havrincourt family from the period 1648 to 1776. There is a chapel of the Virgin with a black Madonna and a chapel of St Martin.

The Bois d'Havrincourt is extensive and there is a fine panoramic view from the Bridge on the Canal du Nord.

== See also ==
- Communes of the Pas-de-Calais department
