= Predicted fire =

Tactical artillery aiming technique

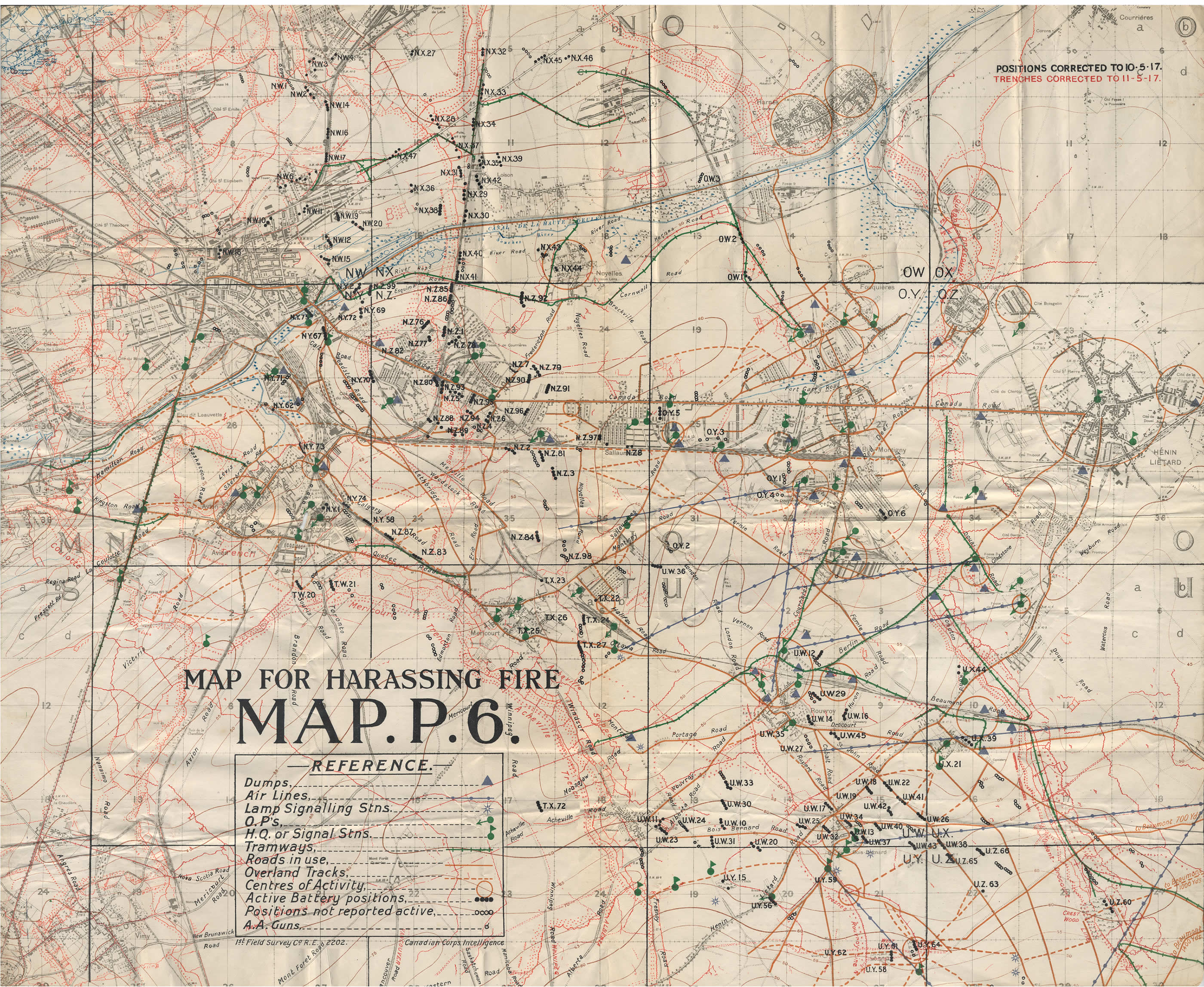
Map used for planning harassing fire in the Lens sector, May 1917

Predicted fire (originally called map shooting) is a tactical technique for the use of artillery, enabling it to fire for effect without alerting the enemy with ranging shots or a lengthy preliminary bombardment. The guns are laid using detailed calculations and surveys to increase aiming accuracy from the first round.

== Field artillery ==
Predicted fire aims to achieve tactical surprise when the target is to be engaged by indirect fire. Gun laying is based on calculations of the range and azimuth of the target relative to the gun position, without the need for ranging shots (or adjusting) or even observation of the target. Ranging shots take time, and alert the enemy both to the presence and position of the guns, and to the likelihood of an attack. Predicted fire enables enemy artillery, strongpoints or troop concentrations to be struck without warning, often shortly before a friendly attack so as to leave no time for recovery, or engagement of targets hidden from observation by friendly forces. It can be used to plan any type of fire, including concentrations or the creeping barrages commonly used in World War I.

Predicted fire was developed during World War I and became the main method of using field artillery until the present day. The first battle in which the fireplan consisted entirely of predicted fire was the Battle of Cambrai in 1917, in which the British guns were moved into surveyed positions at the last moment, achieving tactical surprise when they commenced firing.

Predicted fire requires precise surveying of the gun position and accurate maps. Ideally all firing batteries will have been surveyed onto a common survey grid. Accurate shooting needs complicated calculations including such factors as the elevation of the target and firing position, wind speed and direction, barometric pressure, gun barrel wear and even propellant batch and temperature.

The opposite of prediction is reduction, the process of calculating a target's map co-ordinates for a target registered by firing.

== Anti-aircraft warfare ==
Predicted fire is also used by anti-aircraft guns, using a device called a predictor or director to compute a firing solution.
