= Battle of Cambrai (1917) =

1917 World War I battle

- Part of the Western Front of the First World War
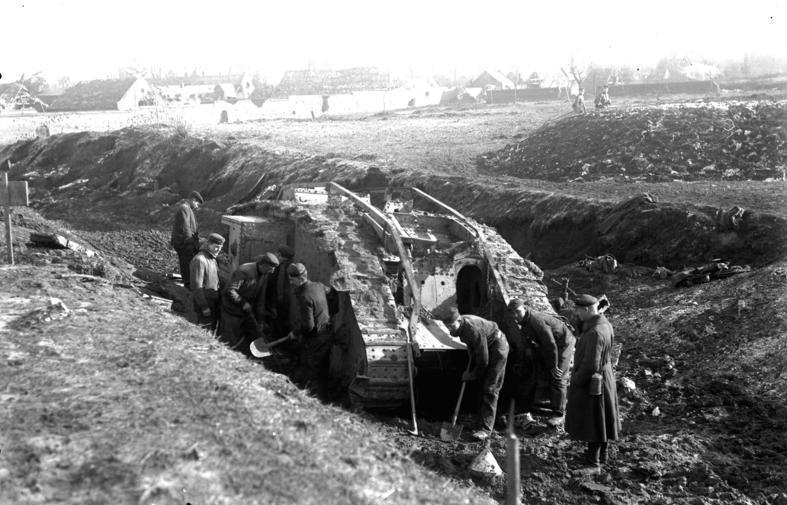
- German soldiers recovering a British Mark IV tank
Date	20 November – 7 December 1917; 2 weeks and 3 days
Location	Southwest of Cambrai, France 50°7′30″N 3°7′30″E
Result	See Aftermath section
Territorial changes	British capture Havrincourt, Flesquières, Ribécourt-Dreslincourt; Germans capture Gonnelieu

Belligerents
British Empire; United Kingdom; India; Newfoundland; France; United States; China	Germany

Commanders and leaders
(United Kingdom of Great Britain and Ireland) Douglas Haig; (United Kingdom of Great Britain and Ireland) Julian Byng; (United Kingdom of Great Britain and Ireland) William Pulteney	(German Empire) Georg von der Marwitz; (German Empire) Otto von Moser; (German Empire) Hugo von Kathen

Strength
15 infantry divisions; 4 cavalry divisions; 1,003 guns; 476 tanks (378 combat tanks)	20 infantry divisions; 1,194–1,240 guns

Casualties and losses
44,207 (c. 6,000 POW); (47,596, 20 November to 8 December); Tanks, 20 November: 179; (65 knocked out, 71 breakdowns, 43 other)	54,720: 8,817 killed; 11,105 POW

The Battle of Cambrai (Battle of Cambrai, 1917, First Battle of Cambrai and Schlacht von Cambrai) was a British attack in the First World War, followed by the biggest German counter-attack against the British Expeditionary Force (BEF) since 1914. The town of Cambrai, in the département of Nord, in France, was an important supply centre for the German Siegfriedstellung (known to the British as the Hindenburg Line) and capture of the town and the nearby Bourlon Ridge would threaten the rear of the German line to the north. Major General Henry Tudor, Commander, Royal Artillery (CRA), of the 9th (Scottish) Division, advocated the use of new artillery-infantry tactics on his sector of the front. During preparations, J. F. C. Fuller, a staff officer with the Tank Corps, looked for places to use tanks for raids. General Julian Byng, commander of the Third Army, decided to combine both plans. (Note: The battle is sometimes described as the first use of large numbers of tanks in combat or even as the first use of tanks at all. Although it was the first big combined arms operation, tanks had been used since the Battle of Flers–Courcelette on the Somme in September 1916.) The French and British armies had used tanks en masse earlier in 1917, although to considerably less effect.

After a big British success on the first day, mechanical unreliability, German artillery and infantry defences exposed the frailties of the Mark IV tank. On the second day, only about half of the tanks were operational and British progress was limited. In the History of the Great War, the British official historian Wilfrid Miles and modern scholars do not place exclusive credit for the first day on tanks but discuss the concurrent evolution of artillery, infantry and tank methods. Numerous developments since 1915 matured at Cambrai, such as predicted artillery fire, sound ranging, infantry infiltration tactics, infantry-tank co-ordination and close air support. The techniques of industrial warfare continued to develop and played a vital part during the Hundred Days Offensive in 1918, along with replacement of the Mark IV tank with improved types. The rapid reinforcement and defence of Bourlon Ridge by the Germans, as well as their counter-attack, were also notable achievements, which gave the Germans hope that an offensive strategy could end the war before American mobilisation became overwhelming.

== Prelude ==
=== British plan ===
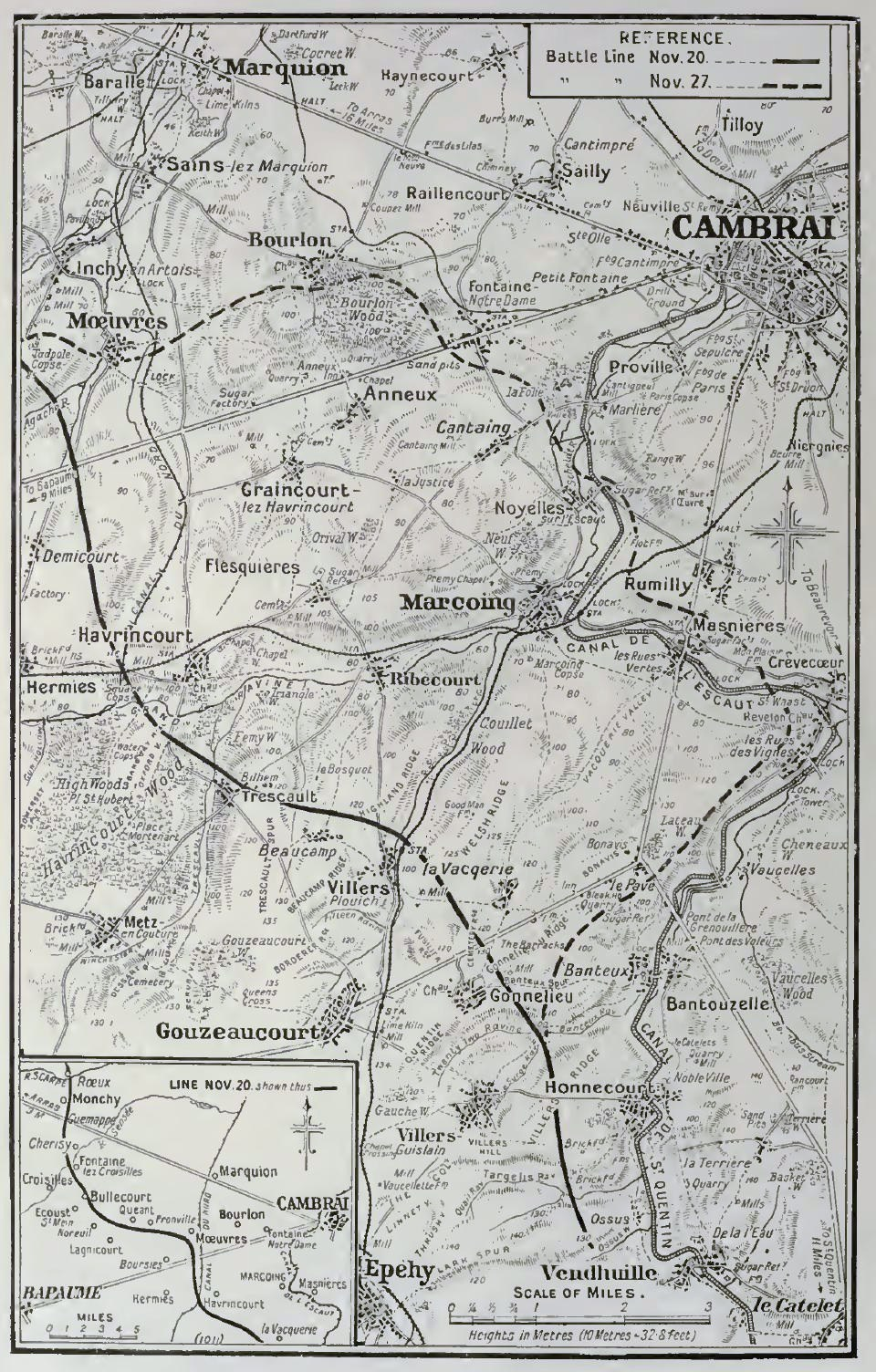
Cambrai area, 1917

Proposals for an operation in the Cambrai area using a large number of tanks originated from Brigadier Hugh Elles of the Tank Corps, and the reliance on the secret transfer of artillery reinforcements to be "silently registered" to gain surprise came from Henry Hugh Tudor, commander of the 9th (Scottish) infantry division artillery. In August 1917, Tudor conceived the idea of a surprise attack in the IV Corps sector, he suggested a primarily artillery-infantry attack, which would be supported by a small number of tanks, to secure a breakthrough of the German Hindenburg Line. The German defences were formidable; Cambrai, was a quiet front and the Germans had built an elaborate defence in depth.

Tudor's plan sought to test new methods in combined arms, with emphasis on joint artillery and infantry tactics to see how effective they were against German fortifications. Tudor advocated using the new sound ranging and silent registration of guns to achieve instant suppression of fire and surprise. He also wanted to use tanks to clear paths through the deep barbed wire obstacles in front of German positions, while supporting the tank force with the No. 106 Fuze, designed to detonate high explosive (HE) ammunition without cratering the ground, to supplement the armour.

=== Air support ===
Two weeks before the start of the battle, the Royal Flying Corps (RFC) began to train its pilots in ground-attack tactics. Before the ground offensive, the RFC was assigned sets of targets to attack, including trenches, supply points and enemy airfields.

== Battle ==
=== Third Army ===
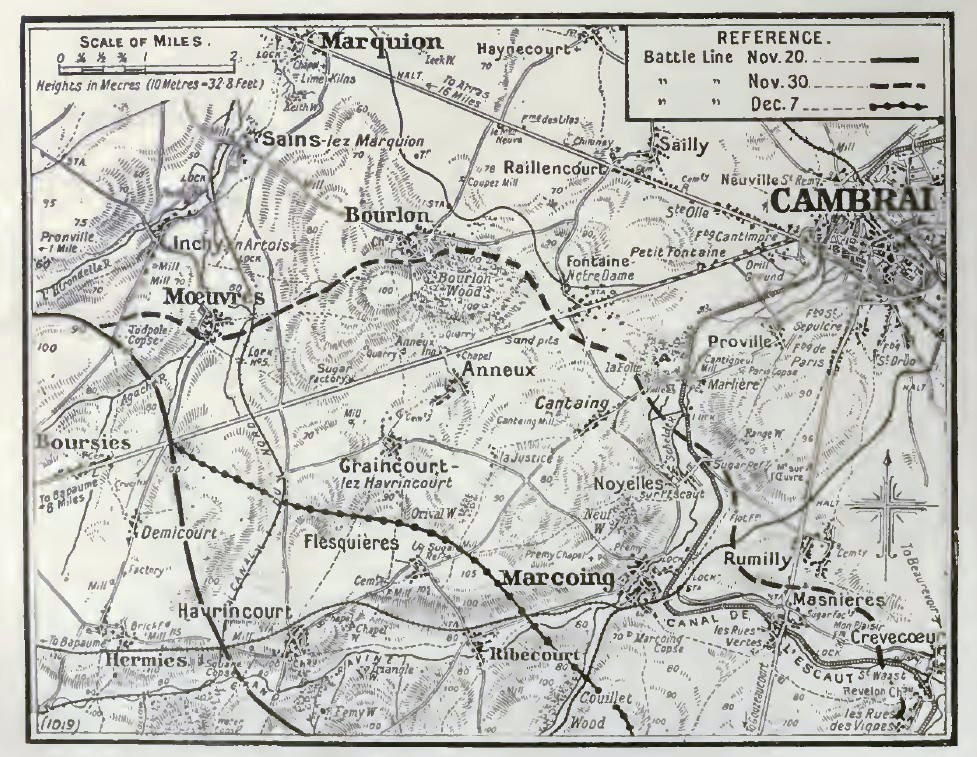
Cambrai salient north, 1917

The battle began at dawn, approximately 06:30 on 20 November, with a predicted bombardment by 1,003 guns on German defences, followed by smoke and a creeping barrage at 300 yd (270 m) ahead to cover the first advances. Despite efforts to preserve secrecy, the Germans had received sufficient intelligence to be on moderate alert: an attack on Havrincourt was anticipated, as was the use of tanks. The attacking force was six infantry divisions of the III Corps (Lieutenant-General Pulteney) on the right and IV Corps (Lieutenant-General Charles Woollcombe) on the left, supported by nine battalions of the Tank Corps with about 437 tanks. In reserve was one infantry division in IV Corps and the three divisions of the Cavalry Corps (Lieutenant-General Charles Kavanagh). Initially, there was considerable success in most areas and it seemed as if a great victory was within reach; the Hindenburg Line had been penetrated with advances of up to 5.0 mi (8 km). On the right, the 12th (Eastern) Division advanced as far as Lateau Wood before being ordered to dig in. The 20th (Light) Division forced a way through La Vacquerie and then advanced to capture a bridge across the Canal de Saint-Quentin at Masnières. The bridge collapsed under the weight of a tank halting the hopes for an advance across the canal. In the centre the 6th Division captured Ribécourt and Marcoing but when the cavalry passed through late, they were repulsed from Noyelles.

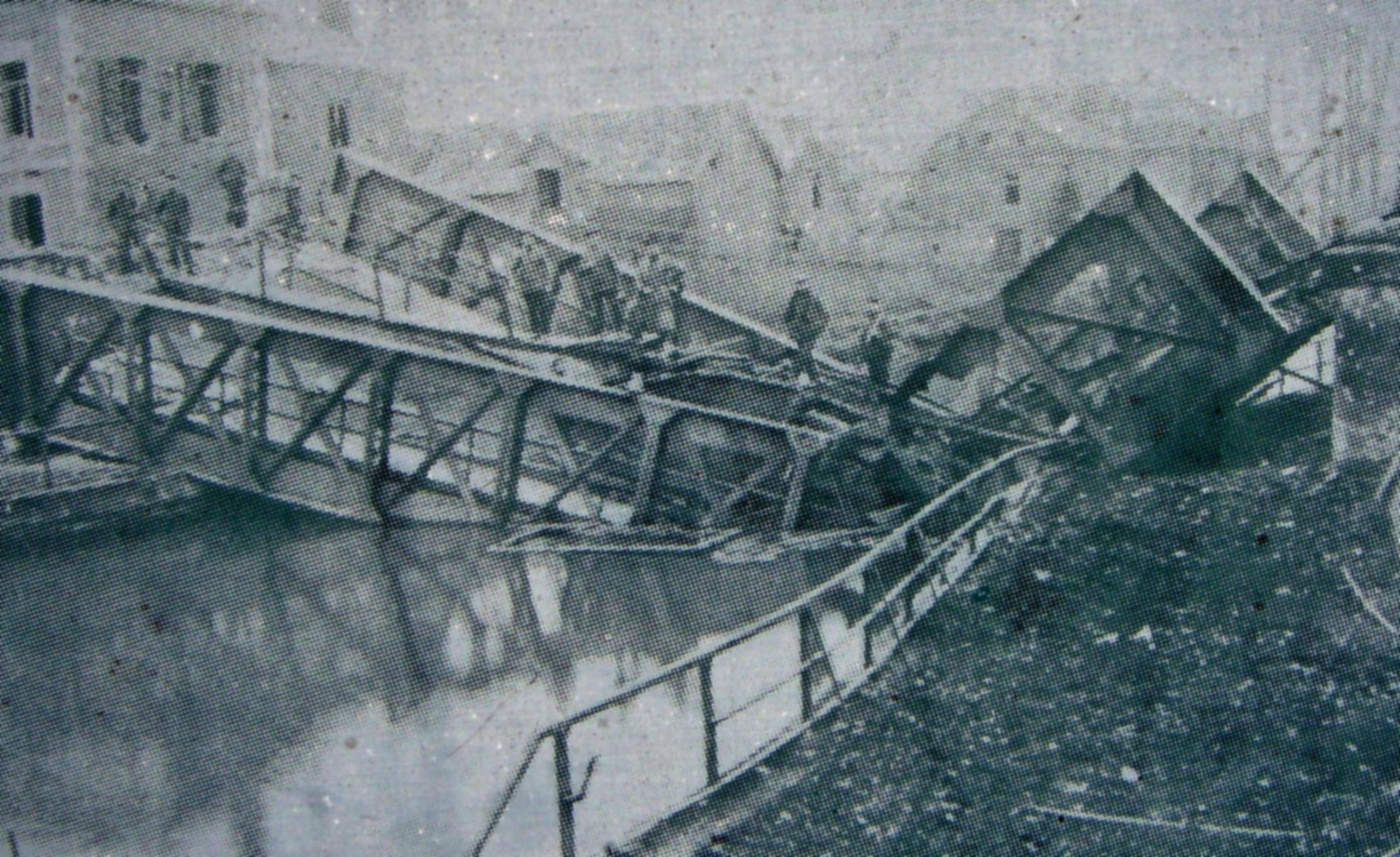
The bridge at Masnières, collapsed by the weight of a Mark IV tank

On the IV Corps front, the 51st (Highland) Division (Major-General George Harper) was held at Flesquières, its first objective, which left the attacking divisions on each flank exposed to enfilade fire. Harper had used a local variation of the tank drill instead of the standard one laid down by the Tank Corps. (Note: Hammond rebutted claims that Harper's changes contributed to the British failure and wrote that they had been exaggerated by Wilfrid Miles, Christopher Baker-Carr and others. The attack was the sixth occasion when the division operated with tanks and the ground in the 51st (Highland) Division area had far more small fortifications. The methods chosen had been tested in training and were not the cause of the check at Flesquières, which was due to the presence in the German 54th Division of Field Artillery Regiment 108 (FAR 108), specially trained in anti-tank tactics and the reluctance of Harper, to commit his reserve brigade.) Flesquières was one of the most fortified points in the German line and was flanked by other strong points. Its defenders under Major Krebs acquitted themselves well against the tanks, almost forty being knocked out by the artillery in the vicinity. (Note: Some accounts claim five were knocked out by an artillery officer, Theodor Krüger, of FAR 108. Haig's dispatch praised the gunner's bravery in his diary. There is little evidence for Krüger's actions, although it is possible that he may have been responsible for as many as nine tanks. Twenty-eight tanks were lost in the action, through German artillery-fire and breakdowns. Haig concluded that skirmishing infantry was needed, to bring the artillery crews under small-arms fire to allow the tanks to operate.) There developed a myth of a lone gunner of Flesquières, credited for numerous tank kills which halted advances there, which ignored the fact that the British tanks were opposed by a specialist anti-tank unit benefiting from the experience against French tanks in the Nivelle Offensive. The Germans abandoned Flesquières during the night.

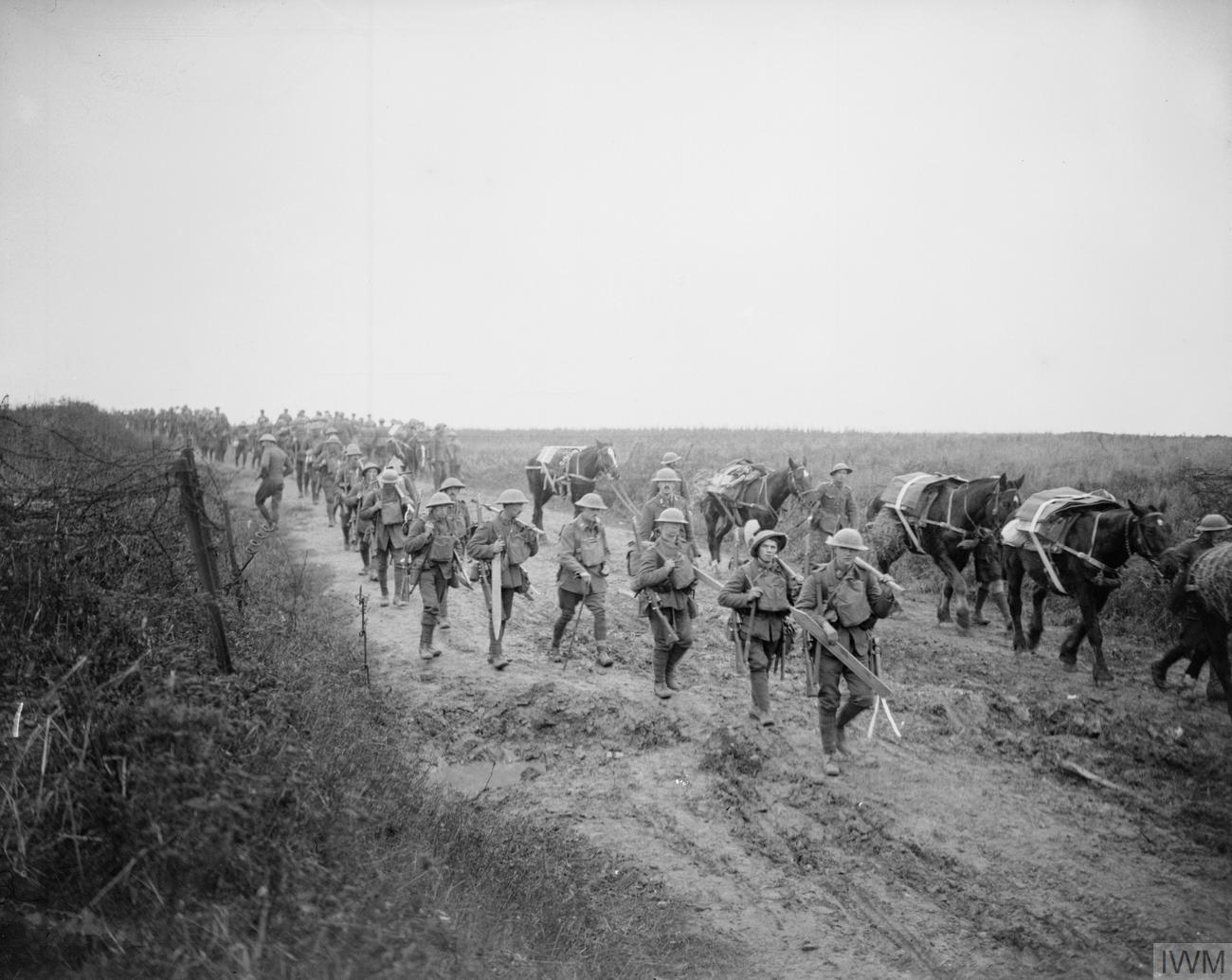
Men of the 16th Battalion, Royal Irish Rifles of the 36th (Ulster) Division moving to the front line 20 November 1917

To the west of Flesquières, the 62nd (2nd West Riding) Division swept all the way through Havrincourt and Graincourt to within reach of the woods on Bourlon Ridge and on the British left, the 36th Division reached the Bapaume–Cambrai road. Of the tanks, 180 were out of action after the first day, although only 65 had been destroyed. Of the other casualties, 71 had suffered mechanical failure and 43 had ditched. The British lost c. 4,000 casualties and took 4,200 prisoners, a casualty rate half that of the Third Battle of Ypres (Passchendaele) and a greater advance in six hours than in three months at Flanders but the British had failed to reach Bourlon Ridge. The German command was quick to send reinforcements and was relieved that the British did not manage fully to exploit their early gains. When the battle was renewed on 21 November, the pace of the British advance was greatly slowed. Flesquières, that had been abandoned and Cantaing were captured in the very early morning but in general the British took to consolidating their gains rather than expanding. The attacks by III Corps were terminated and attention was turned to IV Corps.

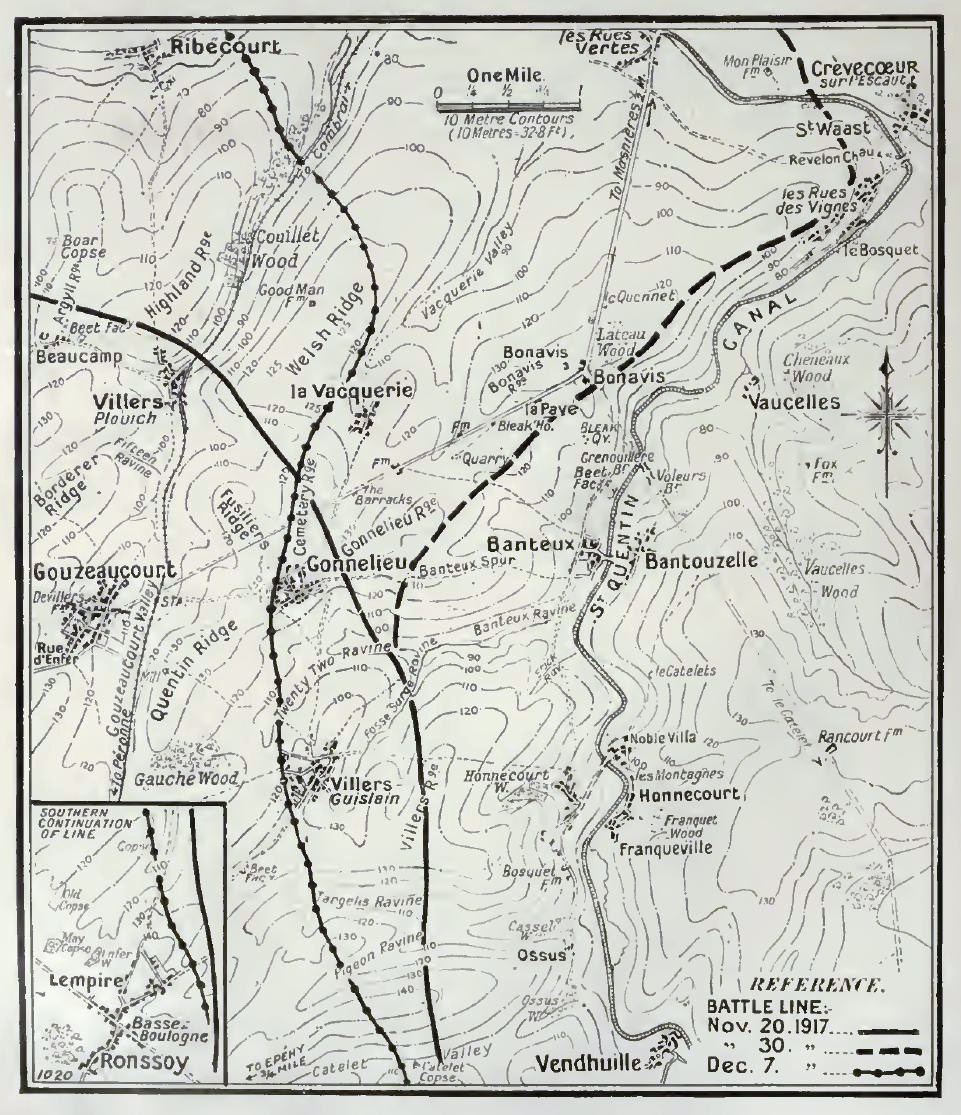
Cambrai salient south, 1917

The effort was aimed at Bourlon Ridge. Fighting was fierce around Bourlon and at Anneux (just before the woods) was costly. German counter-attacks squeezed the British out of Moeuvres on 21 November and Fontaine on 22 November; when Anneux was taken, the 62nd Division found themselves unable to enter Bourlon Wood. The British were left exposed in a salient. Haig still wanted Bourlon Ridge and the exhausted 62nd Division was replaced by the 40th Division (Major-General John Ponsonby) on 23 November. Supported by almost 100 tanks and 430 guns, the 40th Division attacked into the woods of Bourlon Ridge on the morning of 23 November and made little progress. The Germans had put two divisions of Gruppe Arras on the ridge with another two in reserve and Gruppe Caudry was reinforced.

The 40th Division attack reached the crest of the ridge but were held there and suffered more than 4,000 casualties in three days. More British troops were pushed in to move beyond the woods but the British reserves were rapidly depleted and more German reinforcements were arriving. The final British effort was on 27 November by the 62nd Division aided by 30 tanks. Early success was soon reversed by a German counter-attack. The British now held a salient roughly 6.8 mi × 5.9 mi (11 km × 9.5 km) with its front along the crest of the ridge. On 28 November, the offensive was stopped and the British troops were ordered to lay wire and dig in. The Germans were quick to concentrate their artillery on the new British positions. On 28 November, more than 16,000 shells were fired into the wood.

=== German 2nd Army ===
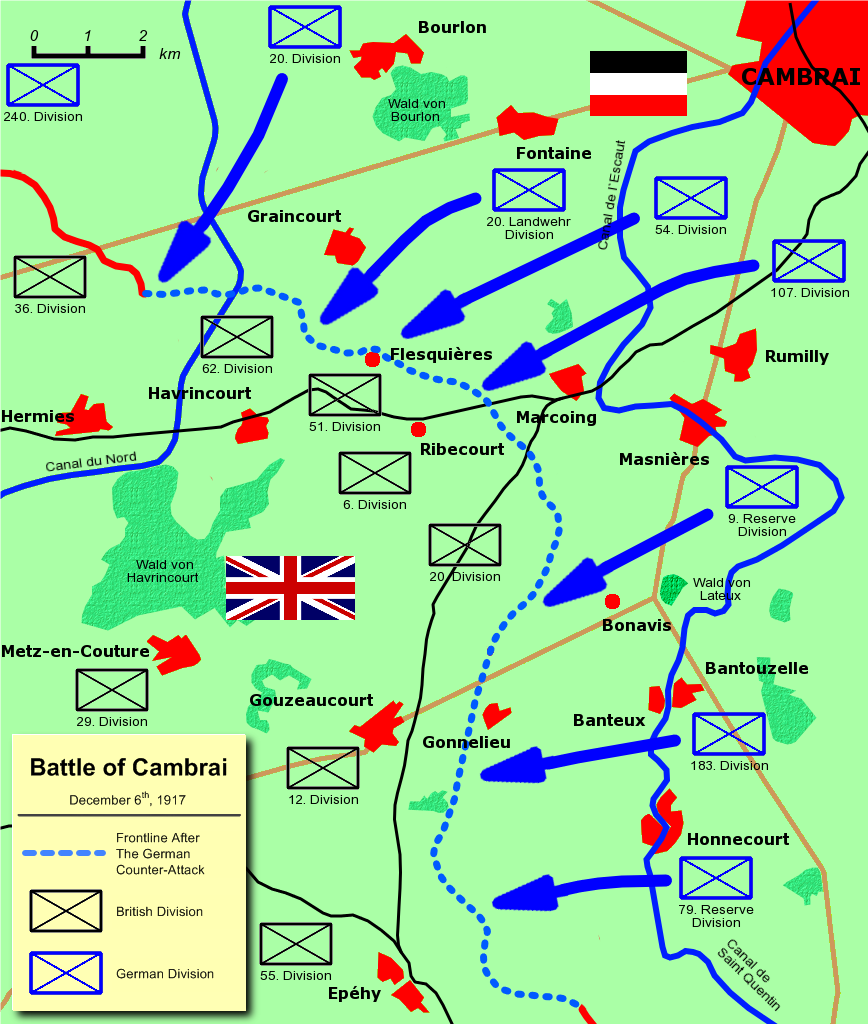
The German counter-attack

As the British took the ridge, German reinforcements began to arrive. By 23 November, the German command felt that a British breakthrough had been prevented and began to consider a counter-stroke and twenty divisions were assembled in the Cambrai area. The Germans planned to retake the Bourlon salient and also to attack around Havrincourt, with diversionary attacks to hold IV Corps; it was hoped to at least reach the old positions on the Hindenburg Line. The Germans intended to employ the new tactics of a short, intense period of shelling followed by a rapid assault using Hutier infiltration tactics, leading elements attacking in groups rather than waves and bypassing strong opposition. Three divisions of Gruppe Arras (Generalleutnant Otto von Moser) were to conduct the initial assault at Bourlon. On the eastern flank of the British salient, Gruppe Caudry was to attack from Bantouzelle to Rumilly to capture Marcoing. Gruppe Busigny advanced from Banteux. The two Gruppen had seven infantry divisions.

British VII Corps (Lieutenant-General Thomas Snow), to the south of the threatened area, warned III Corps of German preparations. The German attack began at 7:00 a.m. on 30 November; almost immediately, the majority of III Corps divisions were heavily engaged. (Note: US troops fought in the fighting on 30 November, when a detachment of the 11th Engineer (Railway) Regiment, working on construction behind British lines, dug reserve trenches at the village of Fins; they were later engaged in combat and suffered 28 casualties.) The German infantry advance in the south was unexpectedly swift. The commanders of the 12th (Eastern) Division and 29th Division were almost captured, with Brigadier-General Berkeley Vincent having to fight his way out of his headquarters and grab men from retreating units to try to halt the Germans. In the south, the German advance spread across 8.1 mi (13 km) and came within a few miles of the village of Metz and its link to Bourlon.

At Bourlon, the Germans suffered many casualties. British units displayed reckless determination; one group of eight British machine-guns fired over 70,000 rounds against the German advance. The concentration of British effort to hold the ridge was effective but allowed the German advance elsewhere greater opportunity. Only counter-attacks by the Guards Division, the arrival of British tanks and the fall of night allowed the line to be held. By the following day, the impetus of the German advance was lost but pressure on 3 December led to the German capture of La Vacquerie and a British withdrawal on the east bank of the St Quentin canal. The Germans had reached a line curving from Quentin Ridge to near Marcoing. The German capture of Bonavis ridge made the British hold on Bourlon precarious. On 3 December, Haig ordered a partial retreat from the north salient and by 7 December, the British gains were abandoned except for a portion of the Hindenburg line around Havrincourt, Ribécourt and Flesquières. The Germans had exchanged this territorial loss for a slightly smaller sector to the south of Welsh Ridge.

== Aftermath ==
=== Analysis ===
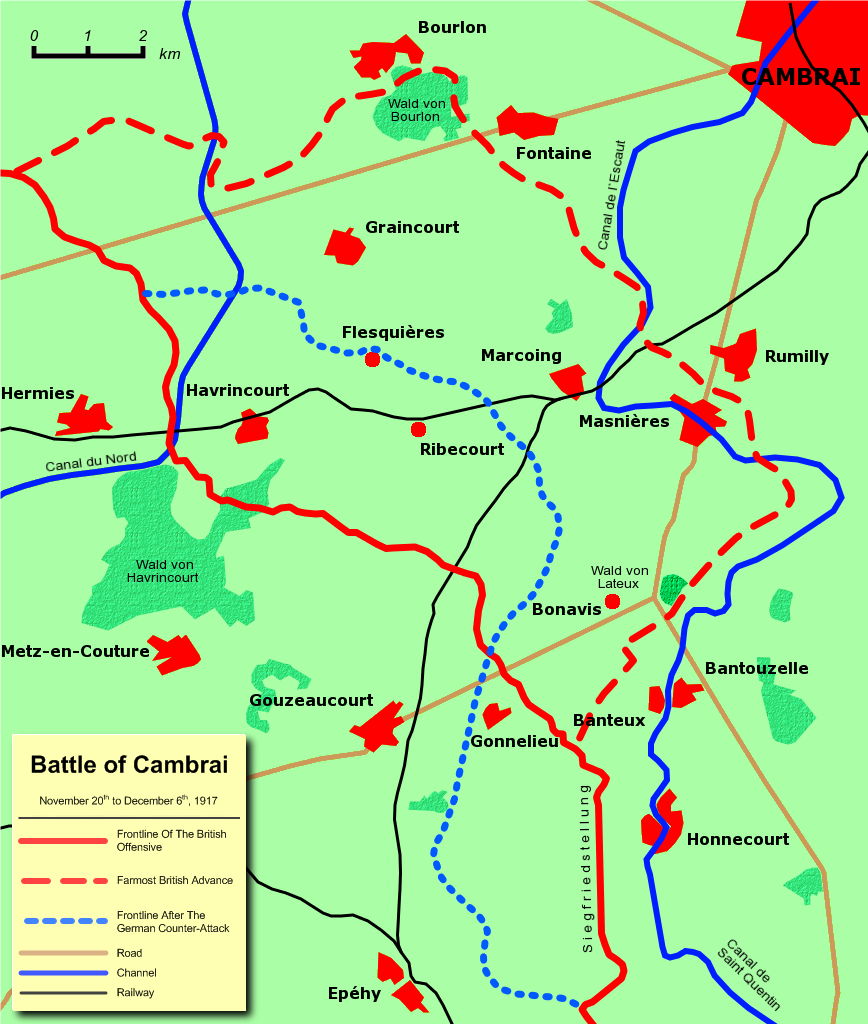
Front lines before and after the battle

The success of the first day was greeted in Britain by the ringing of church bells. The massed use of tanks, despite being a further increase on previous deployments, was not new but the success of the attack and the resulting Allied press enthusiasm was unprecedented. The particular effectiveness of the tanks at Cambrai was the initial passage through barbed wire defences, which had been previously "supposed by the Germans to be impregnable".

The victory showed that even the most elaborate field fortifications could be overcome by a surprise attack, using a combination of new methods and equipment, reflecting a general increase in the British capacity to combine infantry, artillery, tanks and aircraft in attacks. The German revival after the shock of the British advance improved German morale but the potential for similar attacks meant that the Germans had to divert resources to anti-tank defences and weapons, an extra demand that the Germans could ill afford to meet,

Wherever the ground offers suitable going for tanks, surprise attacks like this may be expected. That being the case, there can be no more mention, therefore, of quiet fronts.

— Crown Prince Rupprecht

The German counter-attack showed the effectiveness of artillery, trench mortars and evolving storm troop tactics, adopted from methods introduced by Hutier and his artillery commander, Colonel Georg Bruchmüller, against the Russians. From the German perspective, questions arose regarding battlefield supply beyond rail heads and the suitability of the MG 08 machine gun for rapid movement. By the end of the battle, the British retained some of the ground captured in the north and the Germans a smaller amount taken in the south. The British conducted several investigations, including a Court of Enquiry.

=== Casualties ===
According to the Statistics of the Military Effort of the British Empire during the Great War, the British forces in France, in the period of the Battle of Cambrai suffered 75,681 casualties, 10,042 killed or died of wounds, 48,702 wounded and 16,987 missing or prisoners of war. Wilfrid Miles, the official historian, gave British losses in the Third Army, Tank Corps and the RFC from 20 November to 8 December as 44,207, 40,000 of them in the main battle. On the first day, 179 tanks were lost, 65 being knocked out, 71 suffering mechanical defects and 43 by other causes. the British took 11,105 prisoners, 98 field guns and howitzers and forty heavy guns and howitzers, 456 machine-guns and 74 trench mortars. The British recorded casualties on the basis of a daily head count and during the war the Germans counted the number of patients in hospital every ten days, which omitted lightly wounded, expected to return to service in a few days, not evacuated from the corps area. After the war the Germans compiled the "Sanitätsbericht" (1934) the German Army Medical report of the World War 1914–1918, in which the Germans suffered 54,720 casualties at Cambrai, 8,817 killed and died of wounds, 22,931 wounded and 22,972 missing and prisoners of war.

== See also ==
- Ernst Jünger

== Memorials and cemeteries ==
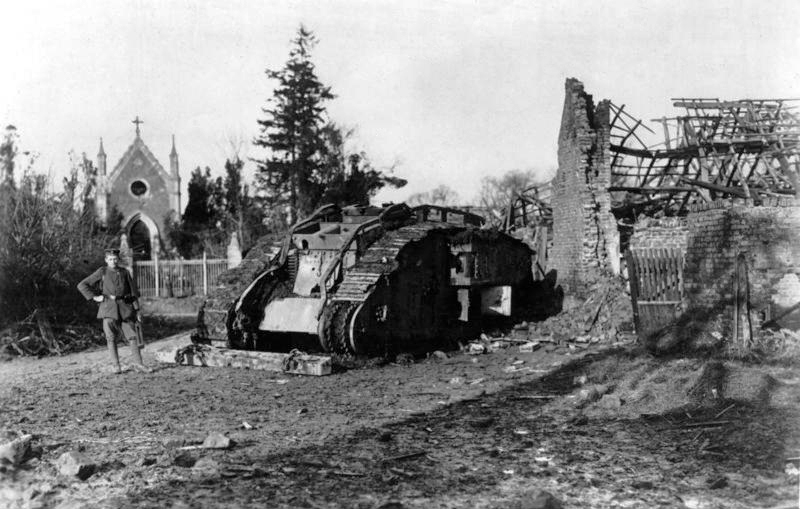
A captured British tank in 1917 (Battle of Cambrai).

The Battle of Cambrai is commemorated annually by the Royal Tank Regiment on Cambrai Day. The contributions of the Newfoundland Regiment at the 1917 Battle of Cambrai are remembered in the village of Masnières at the Masnières Newfoundland Memorial. Cambrai Day is also celebrated by 2nd Lancers (GH) of the Indian Army on 1 December every year as Lance Dafadar Gobind Singh of that unit was awarded the Victoria Cross during this battle. The name Cambrai was chosen in 1917 as the new name for the South Australian town of Rhine Villa, one of many Australian place names changed from German names during the First World War. During the Remilitarization of the Rhineland in the late 1930s, Germany named a newly built Kaserne in Darmstadt after the battle, which was later merged with the nearby Freiherr von Fritsch Kaserne to become Cambrai-Fritsch Kaserne. The United States Army occupied Cambrai-Fritsch Kaserne from the end of the Second World War until 2008, when the land was returned to the German government.

=== British burial sites ===
The Commonwealth War Graves Commission has four Memorials with the names or remains of 9,100 Commonwealth servicemen dead during the Battle of Cambrai:

- Cambrai Memorial to the Missing – the monument lists 7,048 missing soldiers of the United Kingdom and South Africa who died and have no known graves.
- Flesquieres Hill British Cemetery – 900 servicemen were buried, one third unidentified.
- Orival Wood Cemetery – 200 servicemen buried.
- Hermies Hill British Cemetery – 1,000 servicemen buried.

=== German burial sites ===
The German War Cemetery on the Route de Solesmes was established before the offensive in May 1917; it accommodates the remains of 10,685 German and 501 British soldiers.

== Bibliography ==
- Hammond, B. (2009). Cambrai 1917: The Myth of the First Great Tank Battle. London: Orion. ISBN 978-0-7538-2605-8.
- Harris, J. P. (1995). Men, Ideas and Tanks: British Military Thought and Armoured Forces, 1903–1939. Manchester: Manchester University Press. ISBN 978-0-7190-4814-2.
- Littledale, Harold A. (December 1918). "With the Tanks: Part I Anatomy and Habitat". The Atlantic. pp. 836–848. ISSN 1072-7825. Archived from the original on 5 September 2025.
- McNab, Chris (2012). Battle Story: Cambrai 1917. Stroud: The History Press. ISBN 978-0-7524-8371-9.
- Miles, W. (1991) [1991]. Military Operations France and Belgium 1917: The Battle of Cambrai. History of the Great War Based on Official Documents by Direction of the Historical Section of the Committee of Imperial Defence. Vol. III (Imperial War Museum & Battery Press ed.). HMSO. ISBN 978-0-89839-162-6.
- Nicholson, G. W. L. (2006) [1964]. The Fighting Newfoundlander: A History of the Royal Newfoundland Regiment (Carleton Library ed.). Montreal: McGill-Queen's University Press. ISBN 978-0-7735-3133-8.
- Rogers, D., ed. (2010). Landrecies to Cambrai: Case Studies of German Offensive and Defensive Operations on the Western Front 1914–17. Solihull: Helion. ISBN 978-1-906033-76-7.
- Sanitätsbericht über das Deutschen Heeres, im Weltkriege 1914–1918 Die Krankenbewegung bei dem Deutschen Feld- und Besatzungsheer [Medical Services of the German Army During the World War 1914–1918 Transport of Casualties about the German Field and Garrison Armies] (in German). Vol. III. Berlin: Verlag Ernst Siegfried Mittler und Sohn. 1934. OCLC 493867080.
- Sheffield, G.; Bourne, J. (2005). Douglas Haig: War Diaries and Letters 1914–1918 (1st ed.). Weidenfeld & Nicolson. ISBN 978-0-297-84702-1.
- Sheldon, J. (2009). The German Army at Cambrai. Barnsley: Pen & Sword. ISBN 978-1-84415-944-4.
- Smithers, A. J. (2014) [1992]. Cambrai: The First Great Tank Battle. Barnsley: Pen & Sword. ISBN 978-085052-268-6.
- Statistics of the Military Effort of the British Empire During the Great War, 1914–1920 (online scan ed.). London: HMSO. 1922 – via Archive Foundation.
