= Marcoing =

- Commune
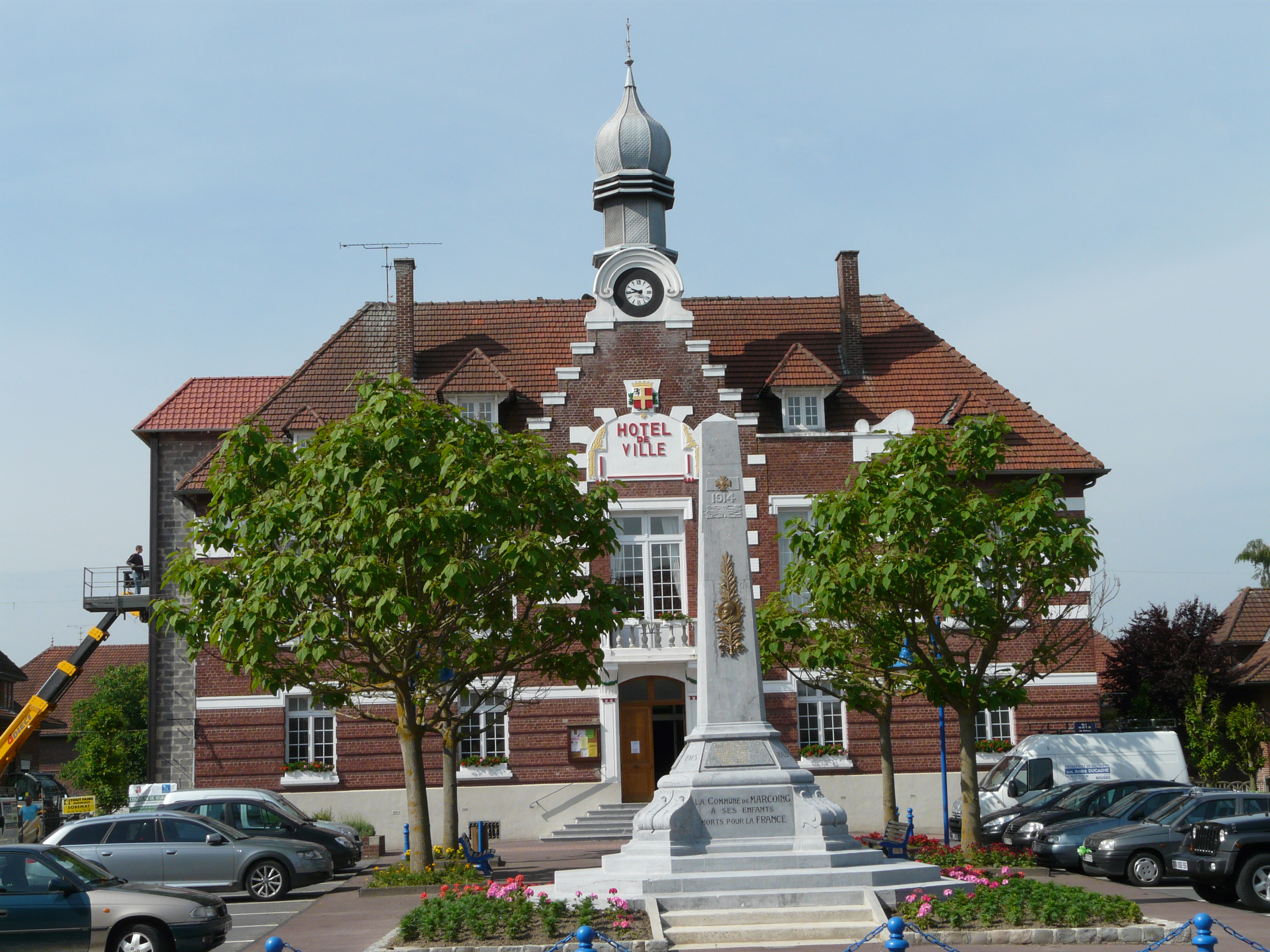
- The town hall in Marcoing

- Coat of arms
- Location of Marcoing
- Location within France Location within Hauts-de-France
- Coordinates: 50°07′14″N 3°10′22″E
- Country: France
- Region: Hauts-de-France
- Department: Nord
- Arrondissement: Cambrai
- Canton: Le Cateau-Cambrésis
- Intercommunality: CA Cambrai

Government
  - Mayor (2020–2026): Jean-Claude Guinet
- Area^{1}: 15.11 km^{2} (5.83 sq mi)
- Elevation: 64 m (210 ft)
- Highest elevation: 127 m (417 ft)
- Lowest elevation: 51 m (167 ft)
- Population (2023): 1,841
  - Density: 121.8/km^{2} (315.6/sq mi)
- Time zone: UTC+01:00 (CET)
  - Summer (DST): UTC+02:00 (CEST)
- INSEE/Postal code: 59377 /59159
- ^{1} French Land Register data, which excludes lakes, ponds, glaciers > 1 km^{2} (0.386 sq mi or 247 acres) and river estuaries.

Marcoing (French pronunciation: [maʁkwɛ̃]) is a commune in the Nord department in northern France.

== History ==
During World War I, there was an alleged incident between a British soldier named Henry Tandey and Adolf Hitler in this area. Hitler was unarmed and appeared wounded, so Tandey chose not to shoot and allowed him to walk off unharmed.

From 1877 to 1969 Marcoing had a railway connection to Achiet-le-Grand via the Achiet–Marcoing railway. Later, a line to Cambrai opened.

== Heraldry ==
Arms of Marcoing	The arms of Marcoing are blazoned: Sable, fretty argent.

== See also ==
- Communes of the Nord department
