= Ploegsteert Wood =

World War I sector in Flanders

Coordinates: 50°44′13″N 2°53′59″E

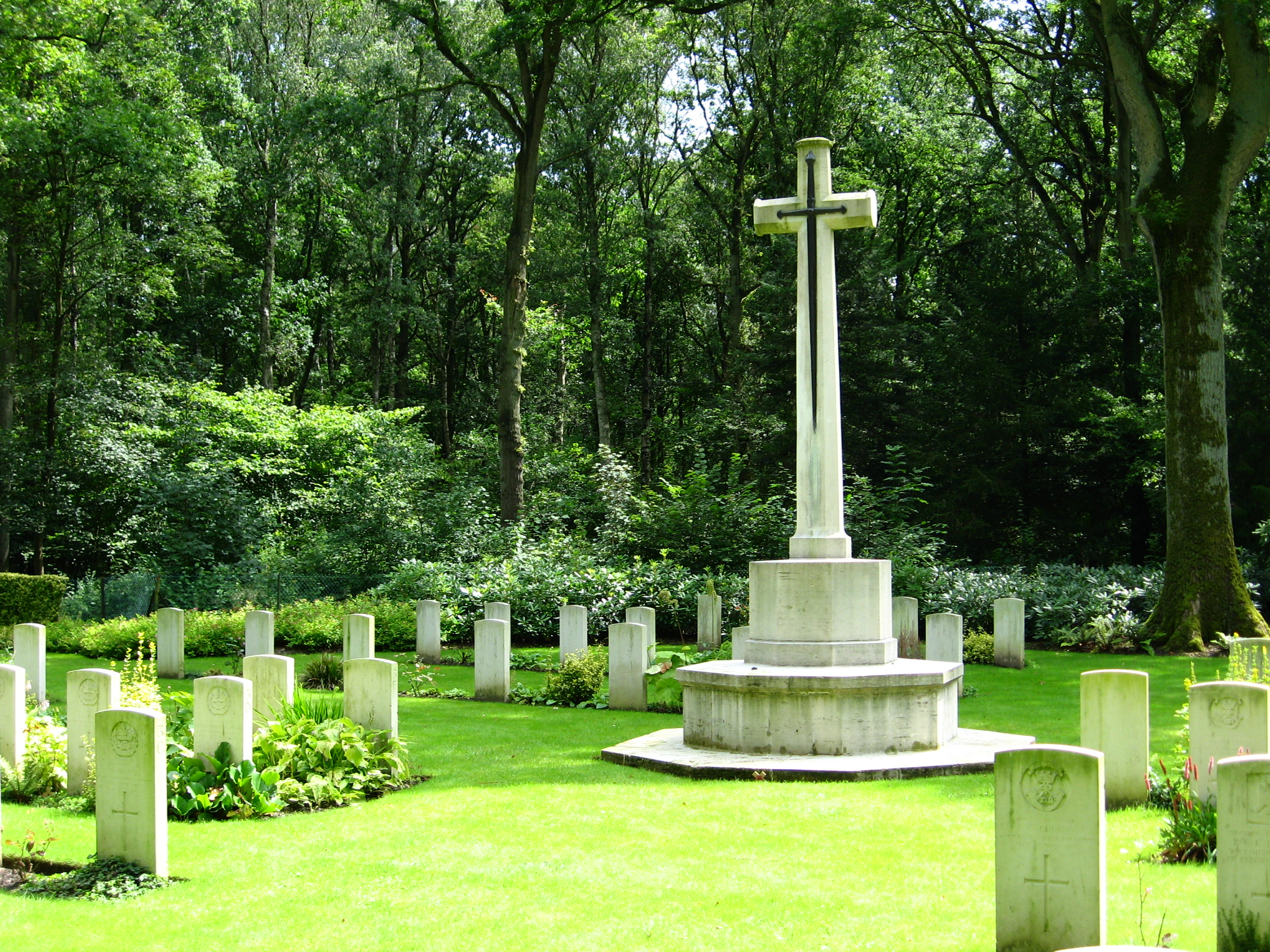
A Cross of Sacrifice in Berks CWGG Cemetery Extension

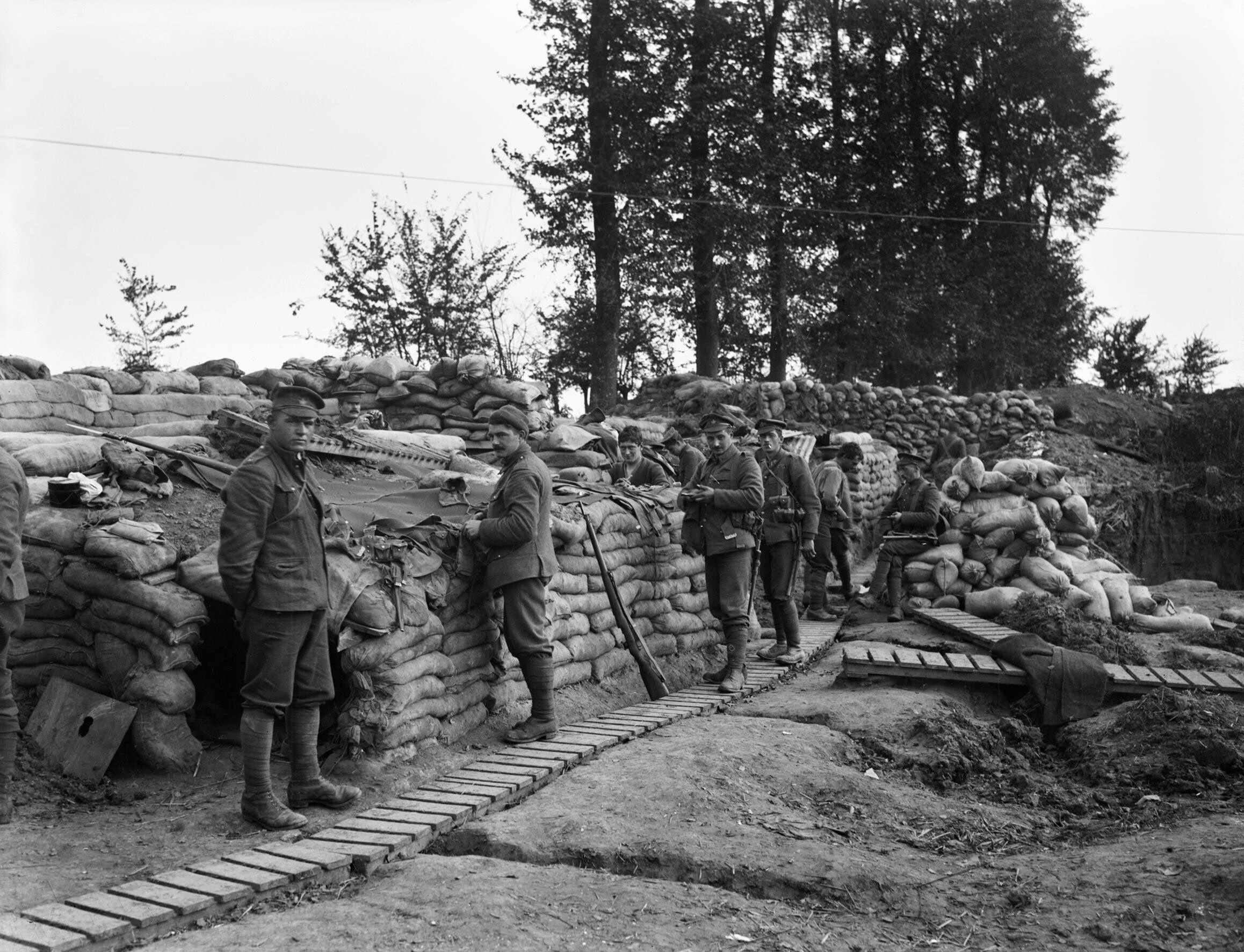
Canadian infantry manning a front line breastwork in Ploegsteert Wood near Ypres, 19 October 1915

Ploegsteert Wood was a sector of the Western Front in Flanders in World War I, part of the Ypres Salient. It is located around the Belgian village of Ploegsteert, Wallonia.

Intense fighting took place as part of the Battle of Armentieres between German and French-British forces (including Royal Hampshire Regiment) between 13th October and 2nd November 1914. After fierce fighting in late 1914 and early 1915, Ploegsteert Wood became a quiet sector where no major action took place. Units were sent here to recuperate and retrain after tougher fighting elsewhere, and before returning to take part in more active operations. British Tommies referred to Ploegsteert Wood as "Plugstreet Wood". From January to May 1916, Winston Churchill served in the area as Commanding Officer (Lieutenant-Colonel) of the 6th Battalion of the Royal Scots Fusiliers.

There are numerous Commonwealth War Graves Commission (CWGC) cemeteries and memorials around the wood, including the Ploegsteert Wood Military Cemetery (with 163 identified casualties) as well as the nearby Hyde Park Corner (Royal Berks) CWGC Cemetery and the Berks CWGC Cemetery Extension with the Ploegsteert Memorial to the Missing. The Ploegsteert Memorial commemorates more than 11,000 British and Empire servicemen who died during the First World War and have no known grave. It is one of several CWGC Memorials to the Missing along the Western Front. Those lost within the Ypres Salient without a known grave are commemorated at the Menin Gate and Tyne Cot Memorial to the Missing, while the missing of New Zealand and Newfoundland are honoured on separate memorials.
