= James MacKenzie (VC) =

- Private James MacKenzie VC depicted on a cigarette card.
- Born: 2 April 1889; New Abbey, Kirkcudbrightshire
- Died: 19 December 1914 (aged 25); Rouges Blanc, France
- Burial place: Remembered on the Ploegsteert Memorial
- Military career
- Allegiance: United Kingdom
- Branch: British Army
- Service years: 1912−1914 †
- Rank: Private
- Service number: 8185
- Units: Scots Guards
- Conflicts: World War I
- Awards: Victoria Cross

Private James MacKenzie VC (2 April 1889 − 19 December 1914) was a British Army soldier and a Scottish recipient of the Victoria Cross (VC), the highest and most prestigious award for gallantry in the face of the enemy that can be awarded to British and Commonwealth forces.

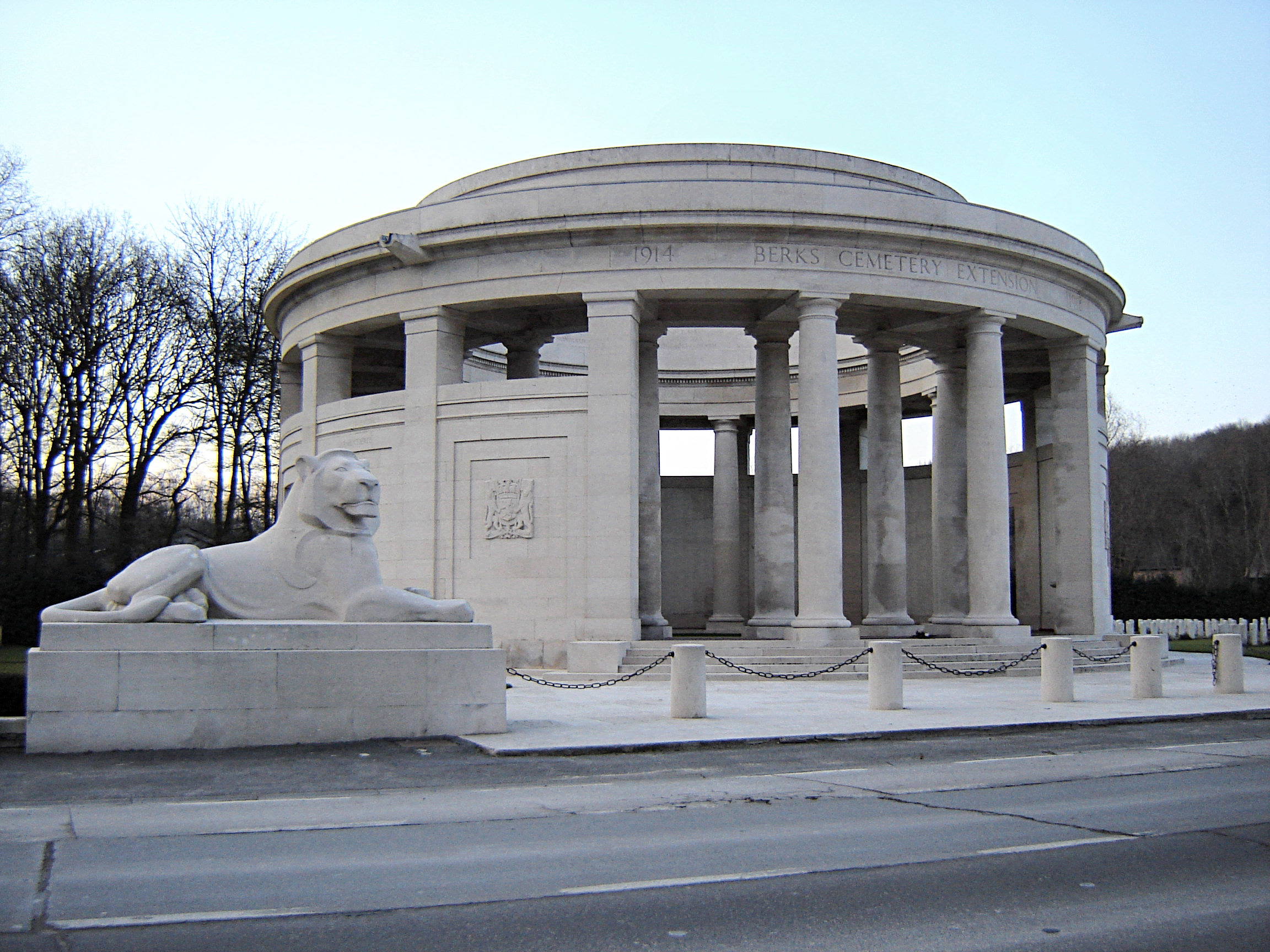
Ploegsteert Memorial to the Missing

MacKenzie was born in New Abbey, Kirkcudbrightshire in 1889 and enlisted in the Scots Guards on 16 February 1912. He embarked for France on 5 October 1914. He was 25 years old, and a private in the 2nd Battalion, Scots Guards, British Army during the First World War when the following deed took place for which he was awarded the VC.

For conspicuous bravery at Rouges Bancs on the 19th December, in rescuing a severely wounded man from in front of the German trenches, under a very heavy fire and after a stretcher-bearer party had been compelled to abandon the attempt. Private Mackenzie was subsequently killed on that day whilst in the performance of a similar act of gallant conduct.

Private MacKenzie has no known grave but his name is listed on panel 1 the Ploegsteert Memorial to the Missing in Berks Cemetery Extension near Ploegsteert in Hainaut, Belgium. There is a memorial tablet at Troqueer Parish Church, Maxwelltown. His Victoria Cross is displayed at The Guards Regimental Headquarters (Scots Guards RHQ), London, England.

== Bibliography ==
- Buzzell, Nora, ed. (1997). The Register of the Victoria Cross. Cheltenham, Gloucestershire: This England Alma House. ISBN 0-906324-27-0.
- Gliddon, Gerald (2011) [1994]. 1914. VCs of the First World War. Stroud, Gloucestershire: The History Press. ISBN 978-0752459080.
- Ross, Graham (1995). Scotland's Forgotten Valour. MacLean Press. ISBN 978-1899272006.
- Harvey, David (2000). Monuments to Courage. Naval & Military Press Ltd. ISBN 1-84342-356-1.
