= Turnell =

Turnell is an English toponymic surname. Notable people with the surname include:

- Reg Turnell, English footballer
