= Thomas Pryce =

Recipient of the Victoria Cross

Thomas Tannatt Pryce
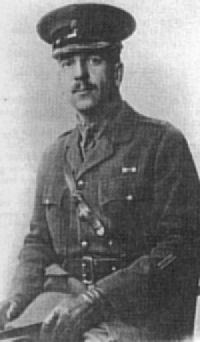
- Born: 17 January 1886; The Hague, Netherlands
- Died: 13 April 1918 (aged 32); Vieux-Berquin, France
- Military career
- Allegiance: United Kingdom
- Branch: British Army
- Service years: 1914–1918
- Rank: Captain
- Units: Gloucestershire Regiment; Grenadier Guards
- Conflicts: First World War: Western Front; German spring offensive; Battle of the Lys †
- Awards: Victoria Cross; Military Cross & Bar; Mention in despatches (2)

Thomas Tannatt Pryce VC MC & Bar (17 January 1886 – 13 April 1918) was a British recipient of the Victoria Cross, the highest and most prestigious award for gallantry in the face of the enemy that can be awarded to British and Commonwealth forces. An officer with the Grenadier Guards during the First World War, he was posthumously awarded the VC for his actions over the period 11 to 13 April 1918, during the German spring offensive.

== Early life ==
Thomas Tannatt Pryce was born at The Hague, the youngest child of four to Thomas and Rosalie Pryce, of Pentreheylin Hall, Montgomeryshire, in Wales. His father was a landowner and merchant, with business ties to London, The Hague, and the Dutch East Indies. He was educated at Shrewsbury School and then had two terms at the Royal Agricultural College in Cirencester before leaving to travel overseas.

By 1913, Pryce was a member of the London Stock Exchange, working at Henry Tudor & Son. He had married the previous year; his wife was Margaret Fordham, the daughter of a magistrate. The couple had three daughters.

== First World War ==
Within a few weeks of the outbreak of the First World War, Pryce enlisted in the Honourable Artillery Company as a private. The unit duly embarked for France in late August. The following month, he had been promoted to lance corporal. In October 1915, having received a commission, he transferred to the 1/6th Battalion, Gloucestershire Regiment, then serving on the Western Front as part of the 48th Division. With the battalion, he was involved in fighting at Gommecourt in late November 1915; he was awarded the Military Cross (MC) for leading an assault on German trenches. The initial attack was successful but when German reinforcements arrived, Pryce executed a safe withdrawal of his men. Wounded in this action, he was evacuated to England for treatment.

Pryce returned to the frontlines in May 1916 and soon afterwards, was awarded a bar to his MC for leading a platoon in an attack at Fauquissart. In September 1916, he transferred to the 4th Battalion of the Grenadier Guards and was promoted to lieutenant. He was mentioned in despatches on 7 April 1918 for his services in the field and three days later was promoted to acting captain.

The German spring offensive had been underway since 21 March 1918, with the British frontlines coming under severe pressure. Pryce's battalion, as part of the 31st Division, had been in reserve, but was brought back to the front on 10 April to hold the line at the village of Le Paradis, near Vieux-Berquin. As commander of a company, he was tasked with the capture and subsequent defence of a village. After seizing the village, he was left with around 40 men and over the next two days fended off attacks by the Germans. At one stage, his position was under direct bombardment from field guns. His force depleted, he was killed making a last-ditch bayonet charge. For his actions, he was posthumously awarded the Victoria Cross (VC). The VC, instituted in 1856, was the highest award for valour that could be bestowed on a soldier of the British Empire. The citation for Pryce's VC read:

For most conspicuous bravery, devotion to duty, and self-sacrifice when in command of a flank on the left of the Grenadier Guards. Having been ordered to attack a village he personally led forward two platoons, working from house to house, killing some thirty of the enemy, seven of whom he killed himself. The next day he was occupying a position with some thirty to forty men, the remainder of his company having become casualties. As early as 8.15 a.m., his left flank was surrounded and the enemy was enfilading him. He was attacked no less than four times during the day, and each time beat off the hostile attack, killing many of the enemy. Meanwhile the enemy brought three field guns to within 300 yards of his line, and were firing over open sights and knocking his trench in. At 6.15 p.m., the enemy had worked to within sixty yards of his trench. He then called on his men, telling them to cheer and charge the enemy and fight to the last. Led by Captain Pryce, they left their trench and drove back the enemy with the bayonet some 100 yards. Half an hour later the enemy had again approached in stronger force. By this time Captain Pryce had only 17 men left, and every round of his ammunition had been fired. Determined that there should be no surrender, he once again led his men forward in a bayonet charge, and was last seen engaged in a fierce hand-to-hand struggle with overwhelming numbers of the enemy. With some forty men he had held back at least one enemy battalion for over ten hours. His company undoubtedly stopped the advance through the British line, and thus had great influence on the battle.

— London Gazette, 21 May 1918

He was also mentioned in despatches posthumously, on 22 May 1918. Pryce's name is recorded on the Ploegsteert Memorial to the Missing in Berks Cemetery Extension near Ploegsteert in Hainaut, Belgium. He has no known grave.

== Victoria Cross ==
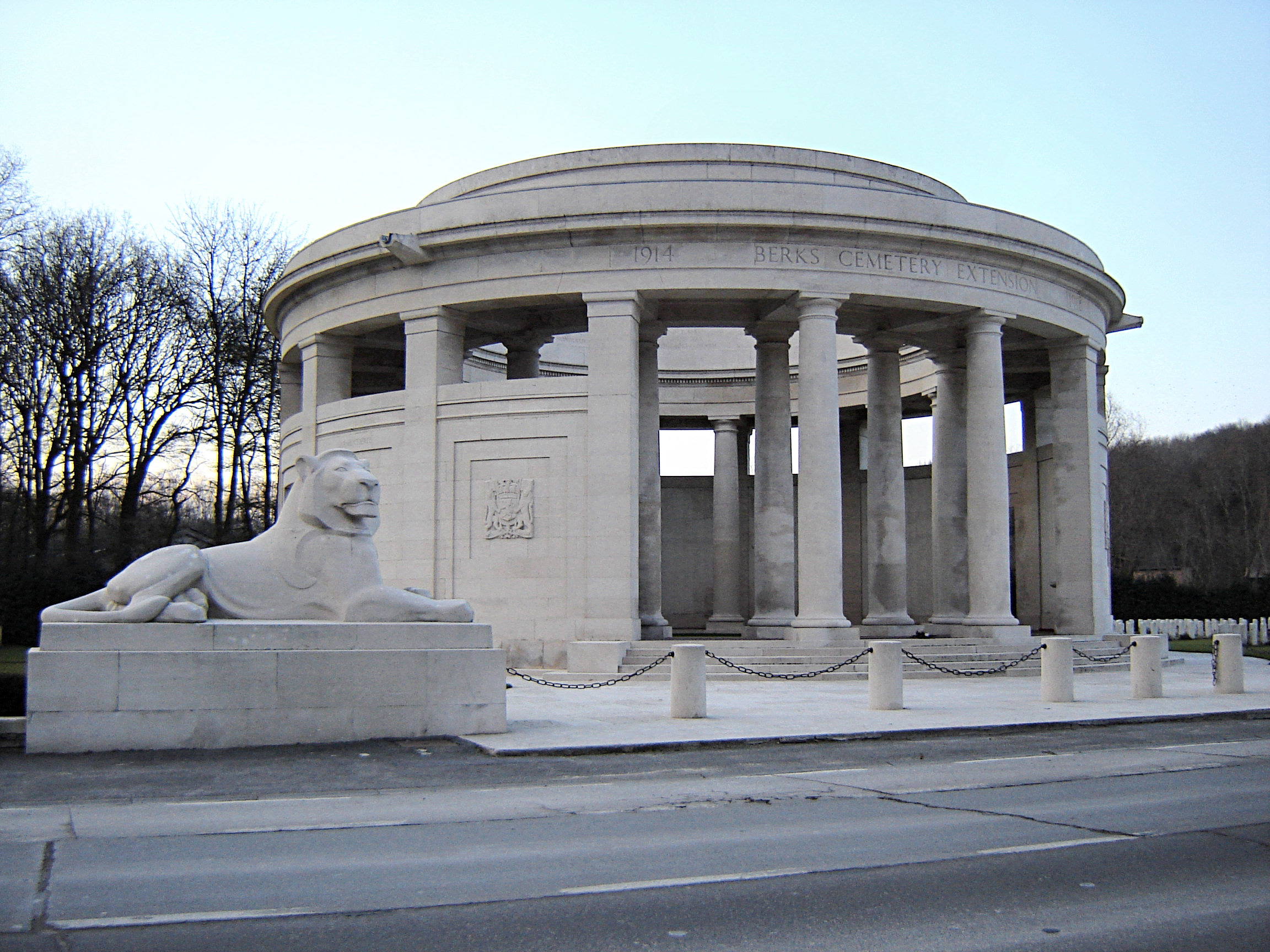
Ploegsteert Memorial to the Missing

King George V presented Pryce's VC to his widow on 12 April 1919, in a ceremony at Buckingham Palace. In addition to the VC and the MC with its bar, he was also entitled to the 1914–15 Star, the British War Medal, and the Victory Medal with oak leaf device. His medals are on loan to The Guards Museum, located at Wellington Barracks in London.

Pryce is associated with several memorials; he is listed on the Maidenhead War Memorial in Berkshire, memorial plaques at Shrewsbury School and Mill Mead School. The latter as moved to St Giles' Church, Shrewsbury, following the closure of Mill Mead school in 1966. He is also remembered at the Stock Exchange Memorial, Llandysilio Church, and the War Memorial at Four Crosses, in the Llandysilio parish.
