= Hyde Park Corner (Royal Berks) Cemetery =

WWI CWGC cemetery in Belgium

Hyde Park Corner (Royal Berks)
- Commonwealth War Graves Commission
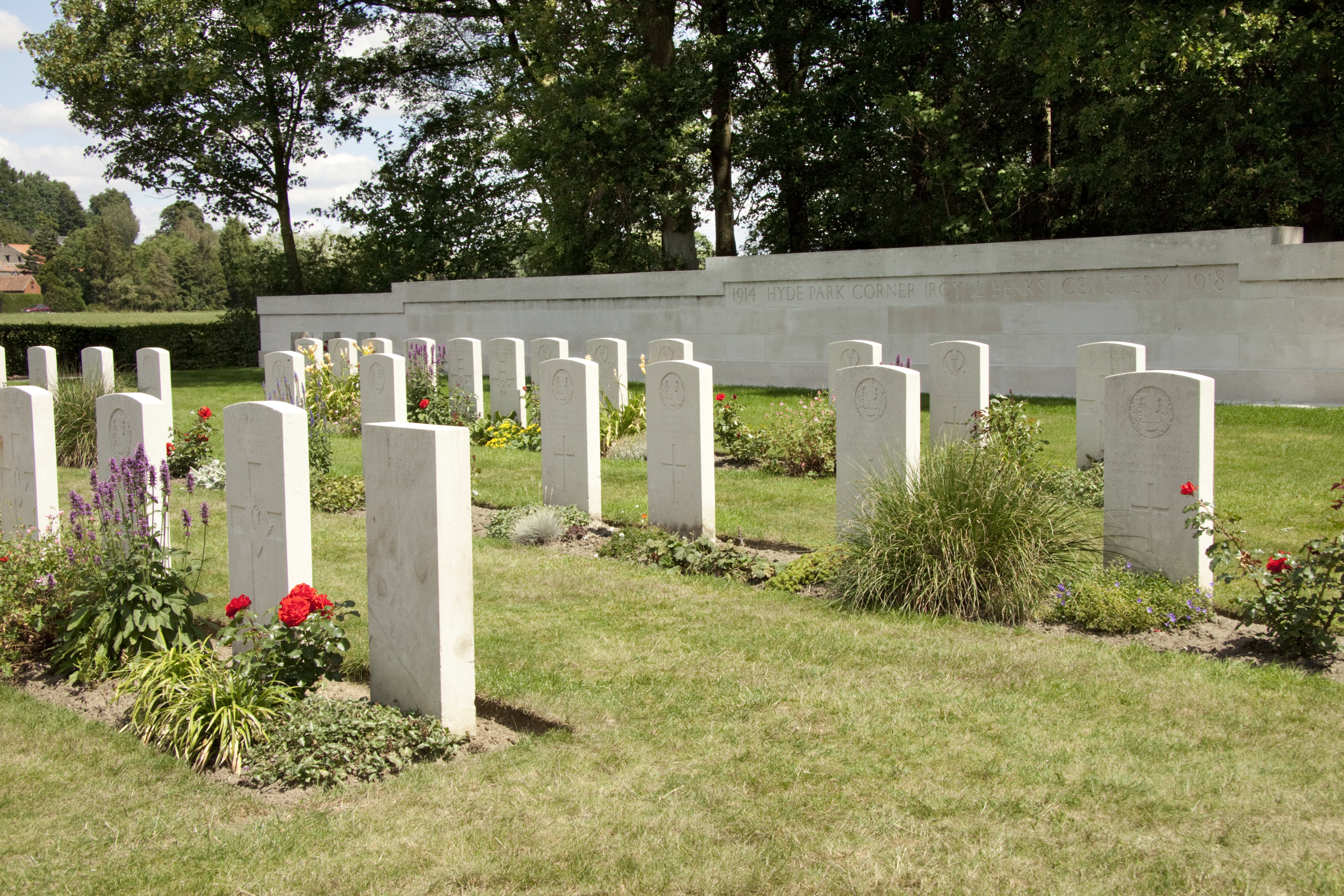
- Used for those deceased April 1915 – November 1917
- Established: 1915
- Location: 50°44′16″N 02°52′59″E near Ploegsteert, Hainaut, Belgium
- Designed by: H Chalton Bradshaw
- Total burials: 87

Burials by nation
- Allied Powers: United Kingdom: 81; Canada: 1; Australia: 1; Central Powers: Germany: 4

Burials by war
- World War I: 87

UNESCO World Heritage Site
- Official name: Funerary and memory sites of the First World War (Western Front)
- Type: Cultural
- Criteria: i, ii, vi
- Designated: 2023 (45th session)
- Reference no.: 1567-WA09

Hyde Park Corner (Royal Berks) Cemetery is a Commonwealth War Graves Commission (CWGC) burial ground in Belgium for the dead of the First World War, located in the village of Ploegsteert in the Ypres Salient on the Western Front.

This small cemetery is not to be confused with the much larger Berks Cemetery Extension, which is also the site of the Ploegsteert Memorial to the Missing. Both of these are located directly opposite, across the road.

== History ==
This small cemetery was originally set up by 1st and 4th Royal Berkshire Regiment troops in April 1915. The cemetery later expanded across the road, where the Berks Cemetery Extension was built, and which now also houses the Ploegsteert Memorial to the Missing.

The cemetery grounds were assigned to the United Kingdom in perpetuity by King Albert I of Belgium in recognition of the sacrifices made by the British Empire in the defence and liberation of Belgium during the war.

The current appearance of the cemetery was designed by H. Chalton Bradshaw, who also designed the Cambrai Memorial in France.

== Notable graves ==
Hyde Park Corner cemetery contains the graves of 87 soldiers, both from the Allied Powers and the Central Powers. The burials include:

- Ronald Poulton-Palmer, who was a well-known rugby union footballer, who captained England in the 1913–1914 season, and played in the last test match before the outbreak of war. He was killed by a sniper in May 1915, while serving a lieutenant in the Royal Berkshire Regiment.
- Albert French, who was a 16-year-old soldier from Wolverton, Buckinghamshire, England. The finding of his letters from the war was one of the reasons why Ploegsteert, as part of Comines-Warneton, was declared a sister city of Wolverton in 2006.
- Samuel McBride of the 2nd Battalion Royal Irish Rifles. He was executed for desertion on 7 December 1916. It is now felt by many that these "shot at dawn" men were unfairly tried and executed as they may have been suffering from combat stress reaction rather than acting in cowardice.

== Gallery ==
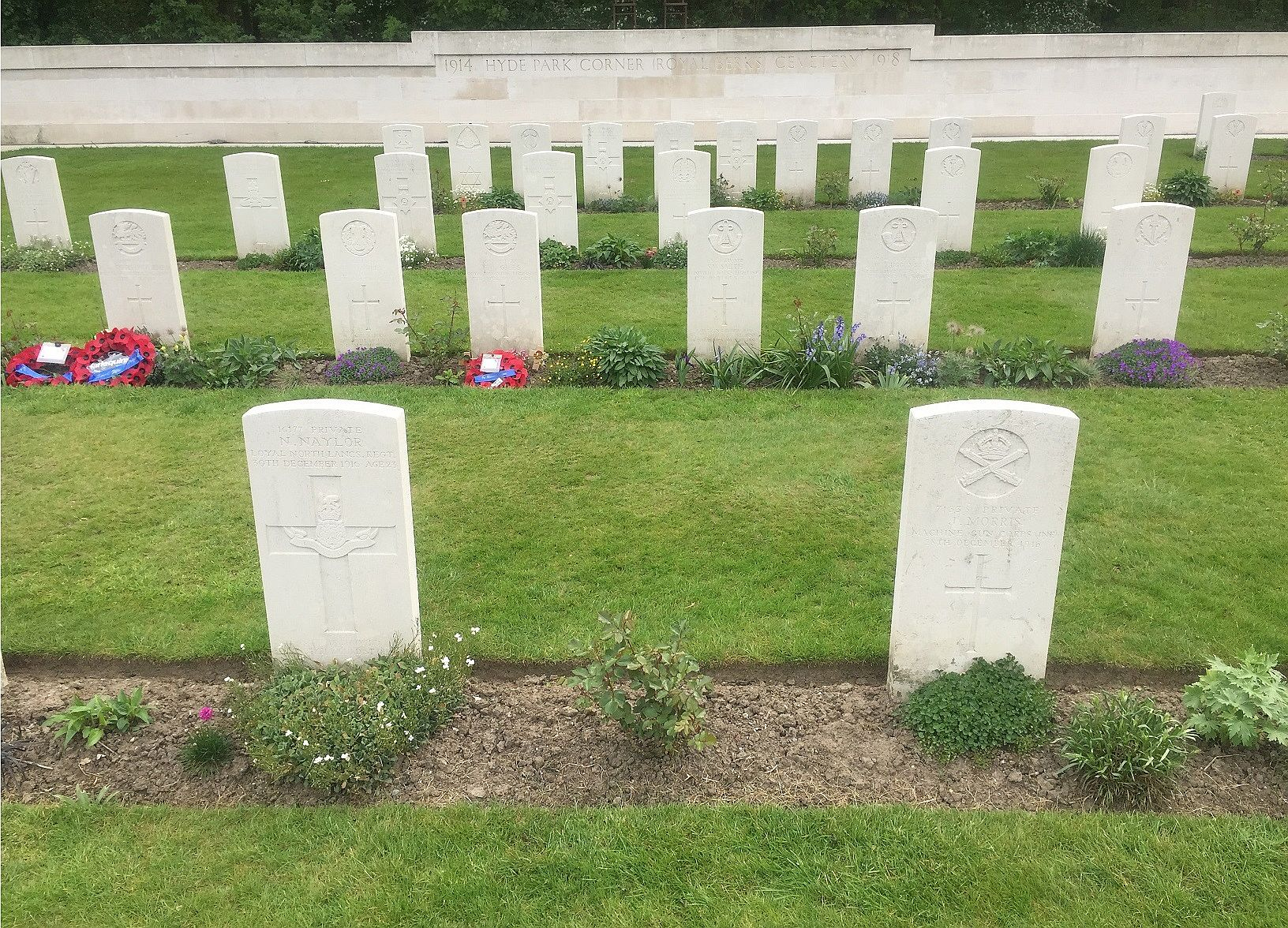

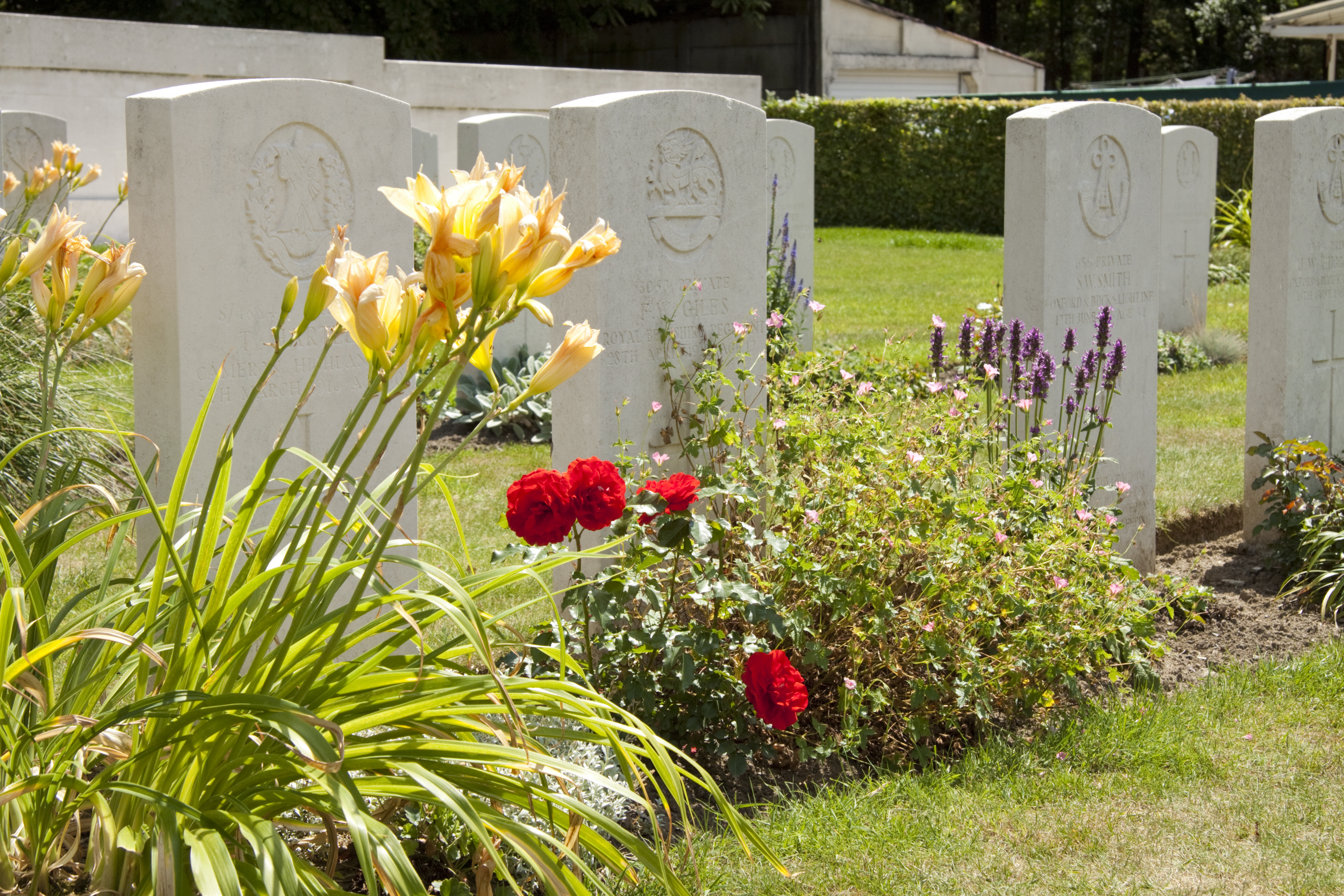

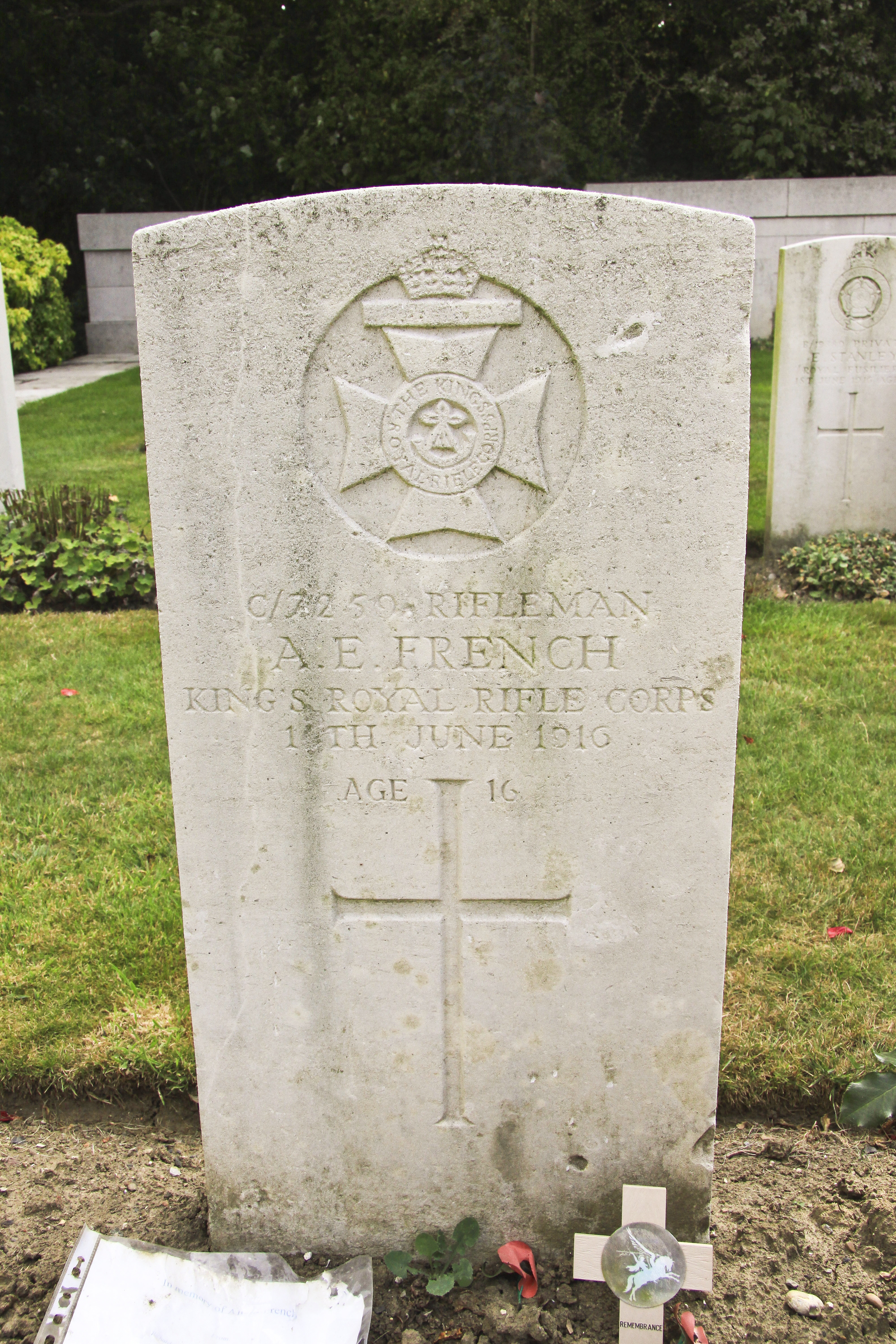
Albert French

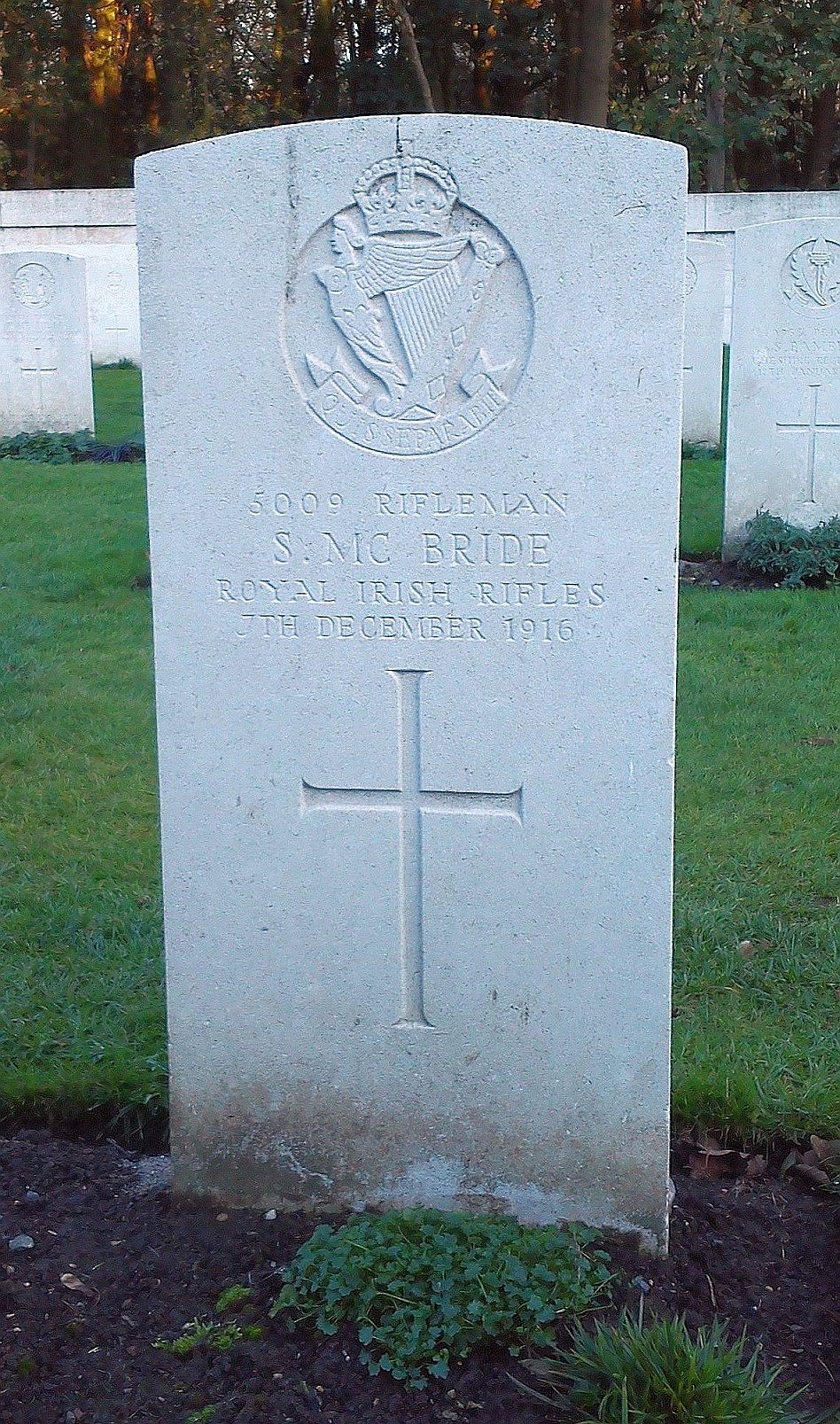
Samuel McBride

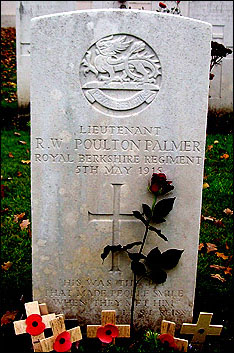
Ronald Poulton-Palmer

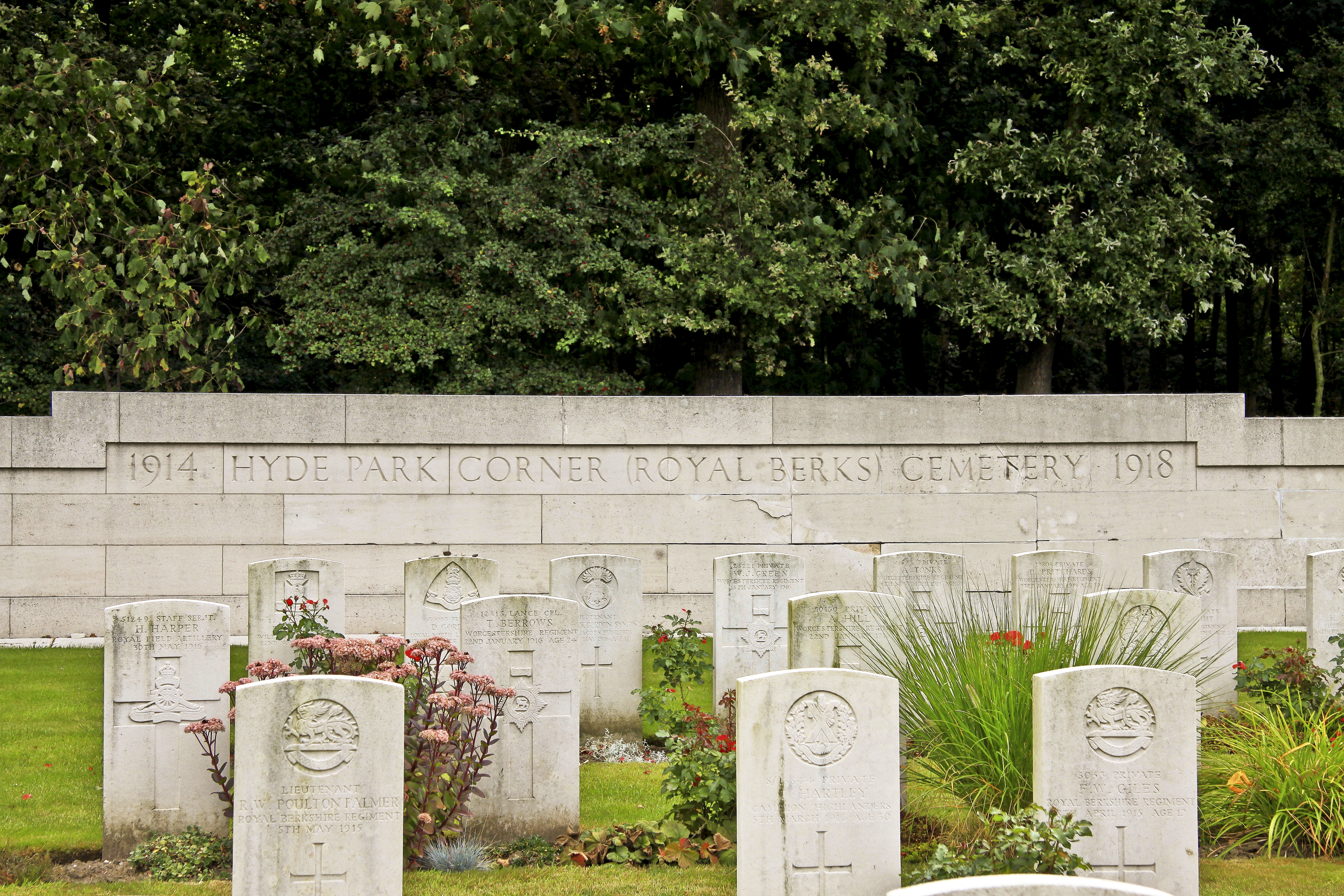

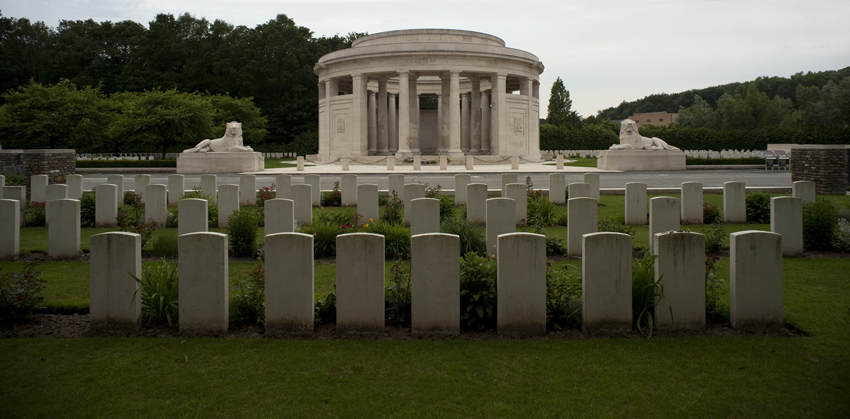
Berks Cemetery Extension and Ploegsteert Memorial to the Missing as seen from the Hyde Park Corner (Royal Berks) Cemetery across the road
