= George William Burdett Clare =

English recipient of the Victoria Cross (1889–1917)

George William Burdett Clare VC
- Born: 18 May 1889; St Ives, Huntingdonshire, England
- Died: 29 November 1917 (aged 28); Bourlon Wood, France
- Military career
- Allegiance: United Kingdom
- Branch: British Army
- Rank: Private
- Service number: 6657
- Units: 5th Lancers (Royal Irish)
- Conflicts: World War I: Western Front; Battle of Cambrai; Battle of Bourlon Wood †
- Awards: Victoria Cross

George William Burdett Clare VC (18 May 1889 – 29 November 1917) was an English recipient of the Victoria Cross, the highest and most prestigious award for gallantry in the face of the enemy that can be awarded to British and Commonwealth forces.

Clare was born on 18 May 1889 in St Ives, Huntingdonshire to George and Rhoda Clare.

He was 28 years old, and a private in the 5th Lancers (Royal Irish), he was awarded the Victoria Cross for his actions on 28/29 November 1917 at Bourlon Wood, France during the Battle of Cambrai at which he was killed.

== Citation ==
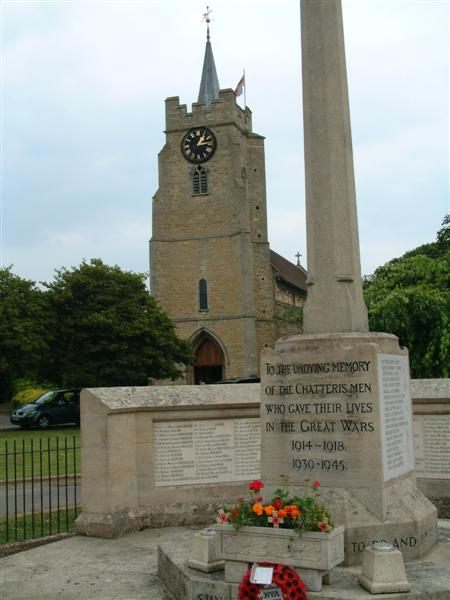
Chatteris War Memorial

For most conspicuous bravery and devotion to duty when, acting as a stretcher-bearer during a most intense and continuous enemy bombardment, Pte. Clare dressed and conducted wounded over the open to the dressing-station about 500 yards away. At one period when all the garrison of a detached post, which was lying out in the open about 150 yards to the left of the line occupied, had become casualties, he crossed the intervening space, which was continually swept by heavy rifle and machine-gun fire, and having dressed all the cases, manned the post single-handed till a relief could be sent. Pte. Clare then carried a seriously wounded man through intense fire to cover, and later succeeded in getting him to the dressing station. At the dressing-station he was told that the enemy was using gas shells to a large extent in the valley below, and as the wind was blowing the gas towards the line of trenches and shell-holes occupied, he started on the right of the line and personally warned every company post of the danger, the whole time under shell and rifle fire. This very gallant soldier was subsequently killed by a shell.

— London Gazette, 8 January 1918

His Victoria Cross will be displayed at The Royal Lancers and Nottinghamshire Yeomanry Museum at Thoresby Park, Nottinghamshire

He is commemorated on the Cambrai Memorial to the Missing, France; in St Peter and St Paul's Church, Chatteris, Cambridgeshire and on Chatteris War Memorial. The local doctors surgery in the town of Chatteris has adopted his name. A pictures and small dedication can be found on the wall of the waiting room of the George Clare Surgery.

== Bibliography ==
- Gliddon, Gerald (2004) [2012]. VCs of the First World War: Cambrai 1917. The History Press. ISBN 978-0-75-247668-1.
