= Reg Turnell =

Welsh footballer

Personal information
- Full name: Edward Reginald Blundell Leaf Turnell
- Date of birth: c. 1891
- Place of birth: Aberystwyth, Wales
- Date of death: 23 November 1917 (aged 25–26)
- Place of death: Cambrai, France
- Height: 5 ft 9 in (1.75 m)
- Position: Outside right

Senior career*
| Years | Team | Apps | (Gls) |
| 1913 | Glossop | 3 | (0) |
| 1913 | Southport Central | 9 | (1) |
- * Club domestic league appearances and goals

Edward Reginald Blundell Leaf Turnell (c. 1891 – 23 November 1917) was a Welsh professional footballer who played as an outside right in the Football League for Glossop.

== Personal life ==
Turnell attended New College, Oxford. He served in the King's (Liverpool Regiment), the Royal Flying Corps and the Middlesex Regiment during the First World War. Turnell was commissioned into the Royal Flying Corps in July 1916, but an accident in October 1916 forced him to depart the Corps. He was serving as a second lieutenant on probation in the Middlesex Regiment when he was killed in an attack at Cambrai on 23 November 1917. Turnell is commemorated on the Cambrai Memorial to the Missing.

== Career statistics ==
Appearances and goals by club, season and competition
| Club | Season | League | | | FA Cup | | Total | |
| Club | Season | Division | Apps | Goals | Apps | Goals | Apps | Goals |
|---|---|---|---|---|---|---|---|---|
| Southport Central | 1912–13 | Central League | 9 | 1 | 0 | 0 | 9 | 1 |
| Career total | | | 9 | 1 | 0 | 0 | 9 | 1 |
