= Ploegsteert Memorial to the Missing =

War memorial in Belgium

Ploegsteert Memorial
- Commonwealth War Graves Commission
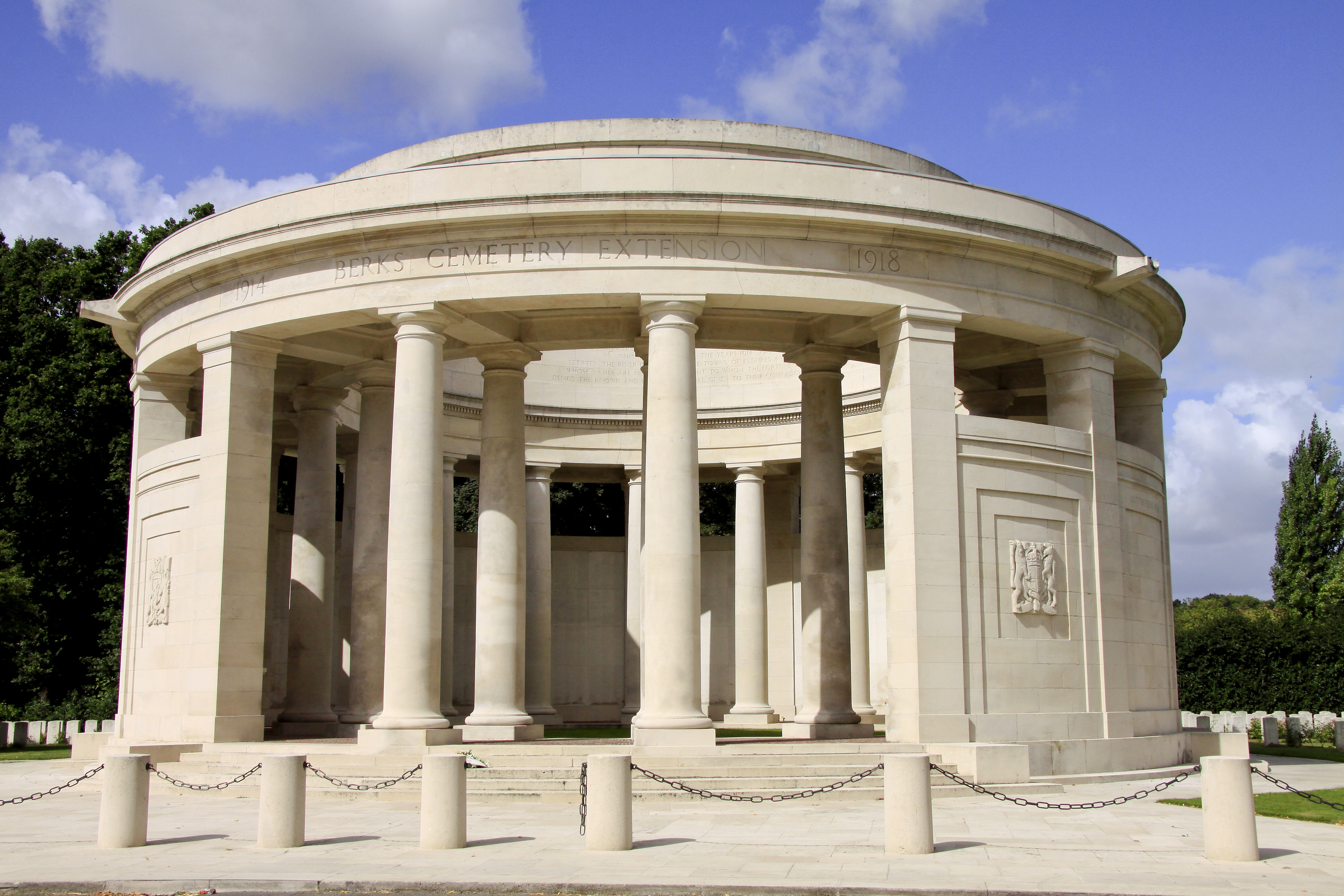
- For soldiers missing in the area during World War I
- Unveiled: 7 June 1931
- Location: 50°44′17″N 02°52′55″E near Ploegsteert, Hainaut, Belgium
- Designed by: H. Chalton Bradshaw; Gilbert Ledward (sculptor)
- To the glory of God and to the memory of 11447 officers and men of the forces of the British Empire, who fell fighting in the years 1914–1918 between the River Douve and the towns of Estaires and Furnes, whose names are here recorded but to whom the fortune of war denied the known and honoured burial given to their comrades in death.

UNESCO World Heritage Site
- Official name: Funerary and memory sites of the First World War (Western Front)
- Type: Cultural
- Criteria: i, ii, vi
- Designated: 2023 (45th session)
- Reference no.: 1567-WA10

The Ploegsteert Memorial to the Missing is a Commonwealth War Graves Commission (CWGC) memorial in Belgium for missing soldiers of World War I. It commemorates men from the Allied Powers who fought on the northern Western Front outside the Ypres Salient and whose graves are unknown. The memorial is located in the village of Ploegsteert and stands in the middle of Berks Cemetery Extension.

== History of the location ==
After Ploegsteert Wood (referred to colloquially as "Plug Street") had been the site of fierce fighting at the start of the war, it became a relatively quiet sector where no major action took place. Allied units were sent here to recuperate and retrain after fighting elsewhere and before returning to active operations. Berks Cemetery Extension was founded by Commonwealth troops in June 1916 as an extension to Hyde Park Corner (Royal Berks) Cemetery which lies across the road. The cemetery grounds were assigned to the United Kingdom in perpetuity by King Albert I of Belgium in recognition of the sacrifices made by the British Empire in the defence and liberation of Belgium during the war.

== Memorial to the Missing ==
The Ploegsteert Memorial to the Missing is one of several CWGC Memorials to the Missing along the Western Front: those lost within the Ypres Salient are commemorated at the Menin Gate and Tyne Cot Memorial to the Missing, while the missing of New Zealand and Newfoundland are honoured on separate memorials. The Ploegsteert Memorial was designed by H Chalton Bradshaw, who also designed the Cambrai Memorial in France, apart from two large lions which were commissioned from the sculptor Gilbert Ledward. The Ploegsteert Memorial is 70 ft (21 m) in diameter and 38 ft 6 in (11.73 m) tall and was unveiled on 7 June 1931 by the then-Duke of Brabant, later King Leopold III of Belgium.

The Ploegsteert Memorial lists over 11,000 missing Commonwealth soldiers from the following battles, which were fought outside the Ypres Salient in the area around Ploegsteert:

- Armentieres
- Aubers Ridge
- Loos
- Fromelles
- Estaires
- Hazebrouck (part of the Battle of the Lys)
- Scherpenberg (part of the Battle of the Lys)
- Outtersteene Ridge (known as the 'Action of Outtersteene Ridge', 18 August 1918)

The memorial also commemorates the names of three recipients of the Victoria Cross who have no known grave:

- Sapper William Hackett VC
- Private James MacKenzie VC
- Captain Thomas Pryce VC

== "The Last Post" ==
Since 7 June 1999, the Comité du Memorial de Ploegsteert has arranged for the Last Post to be played at the memorial on the first Friday of each month.

== Gallery ==
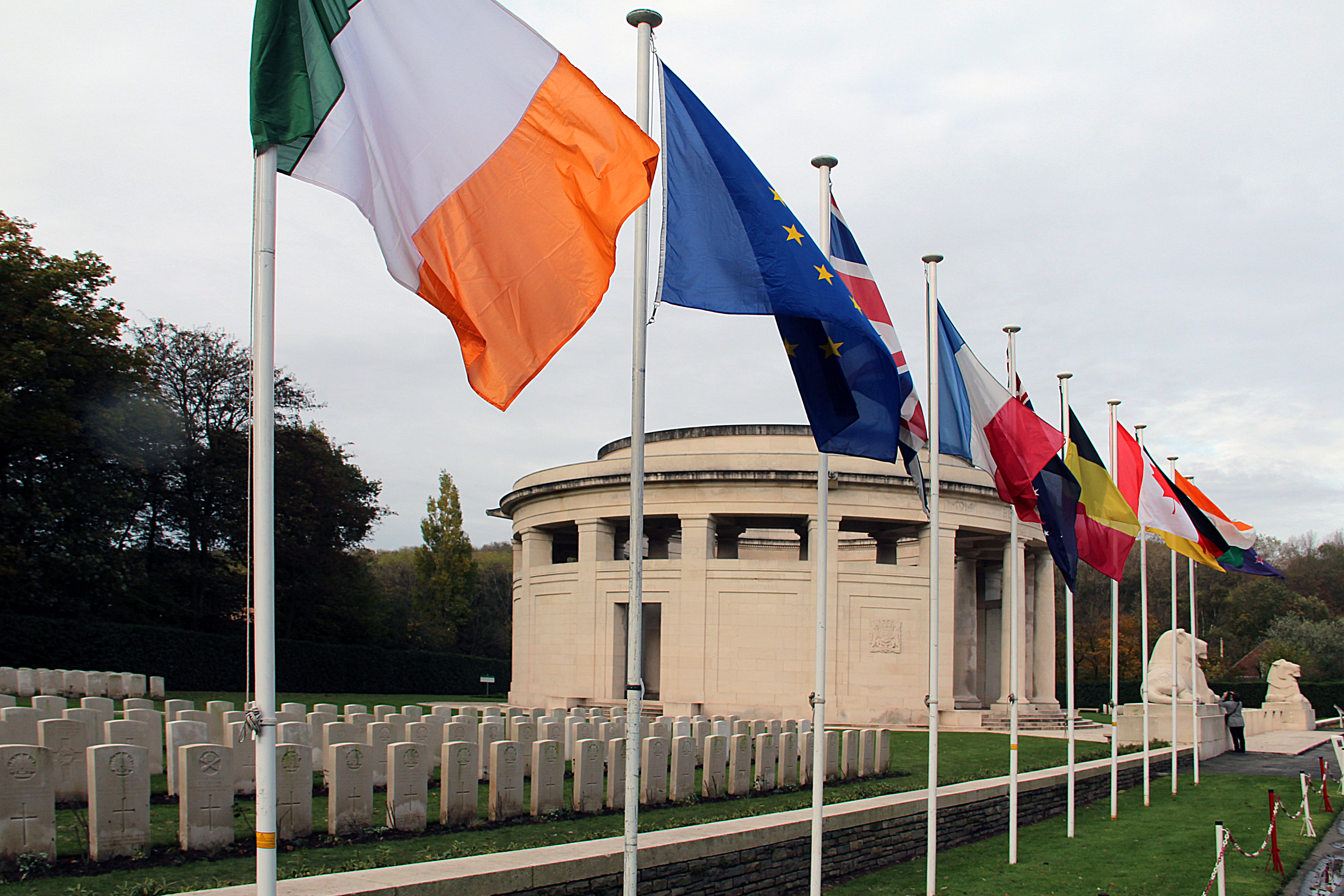
The memorial in the Berks Cemetery Extension

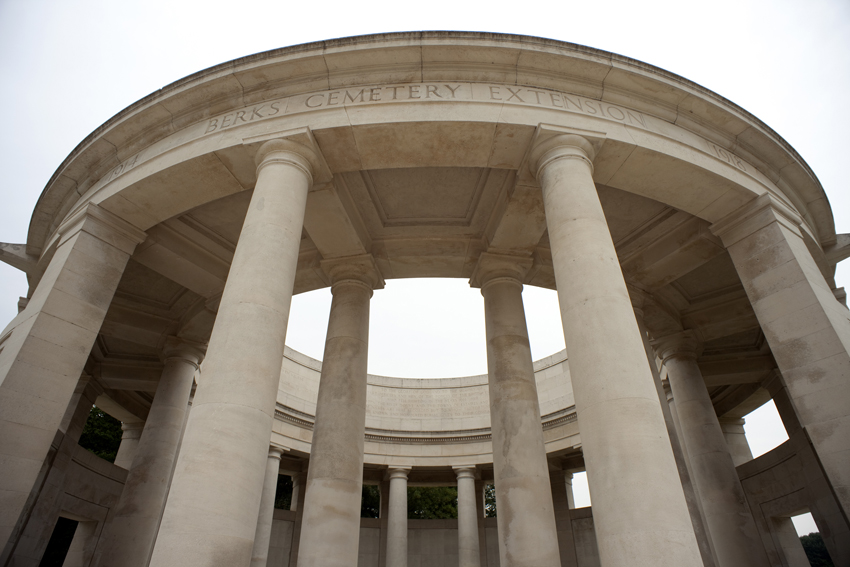
Colonnade of the memorial

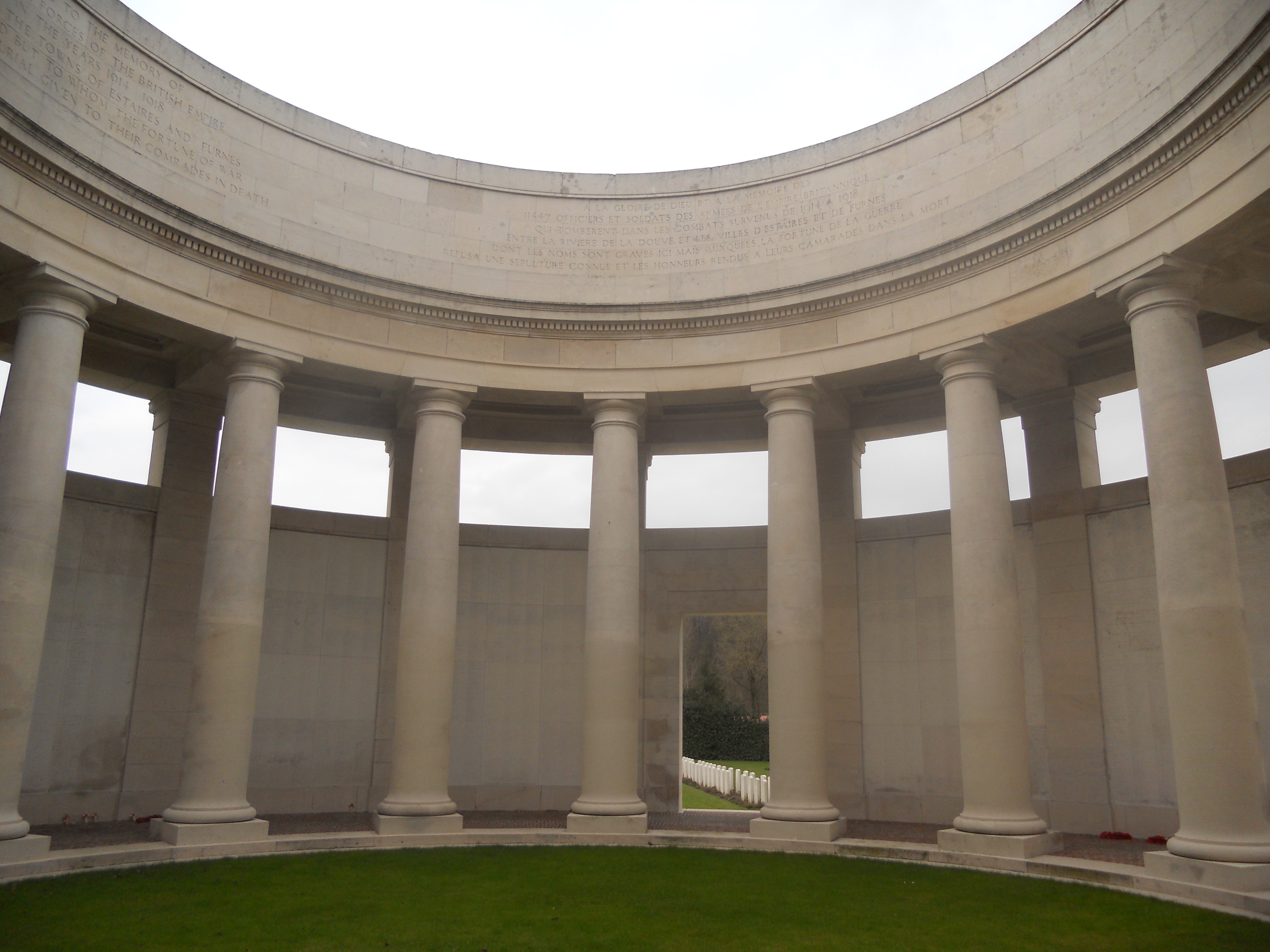
Colonnade of the memorial

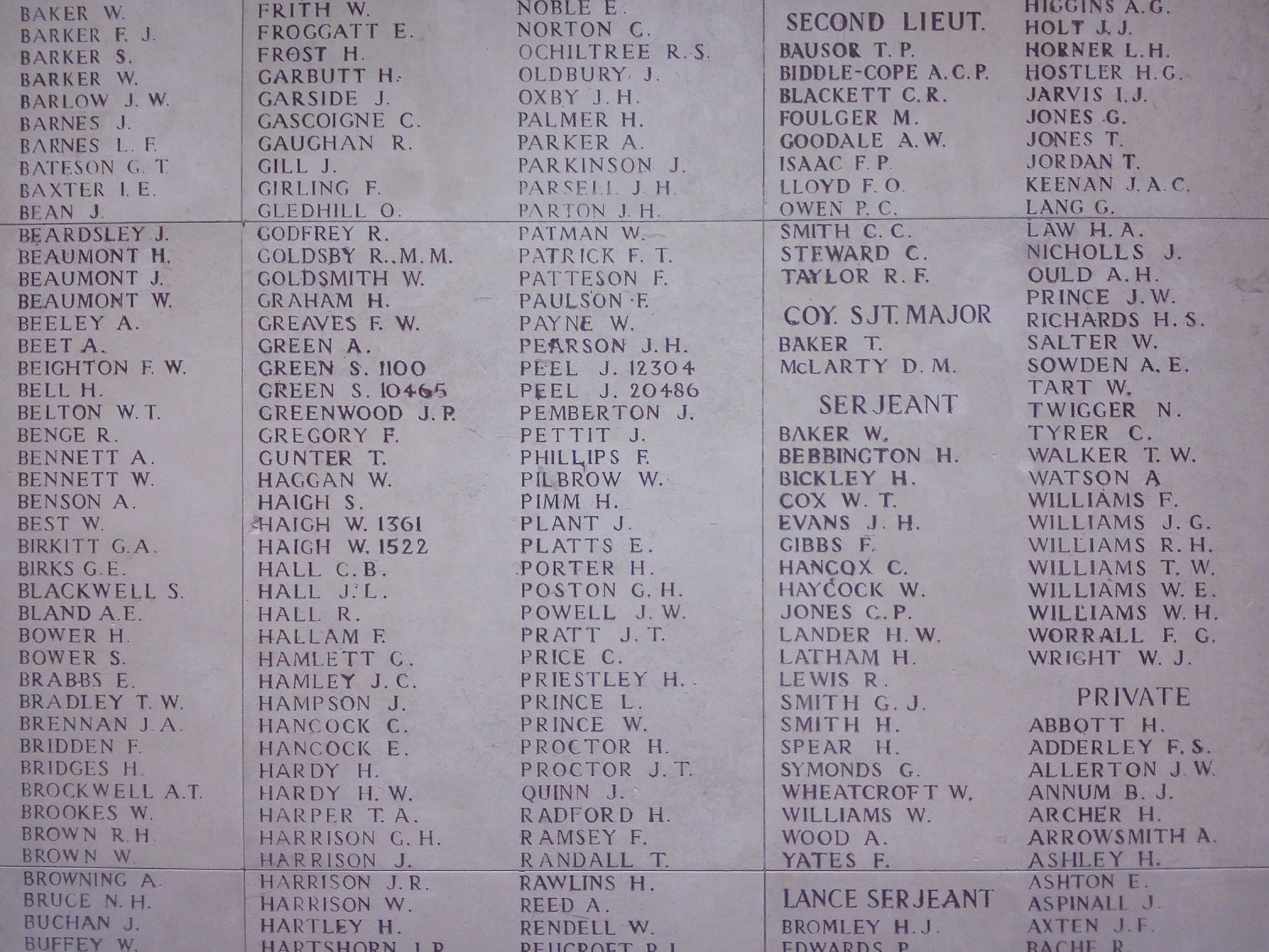
Names of the fallen

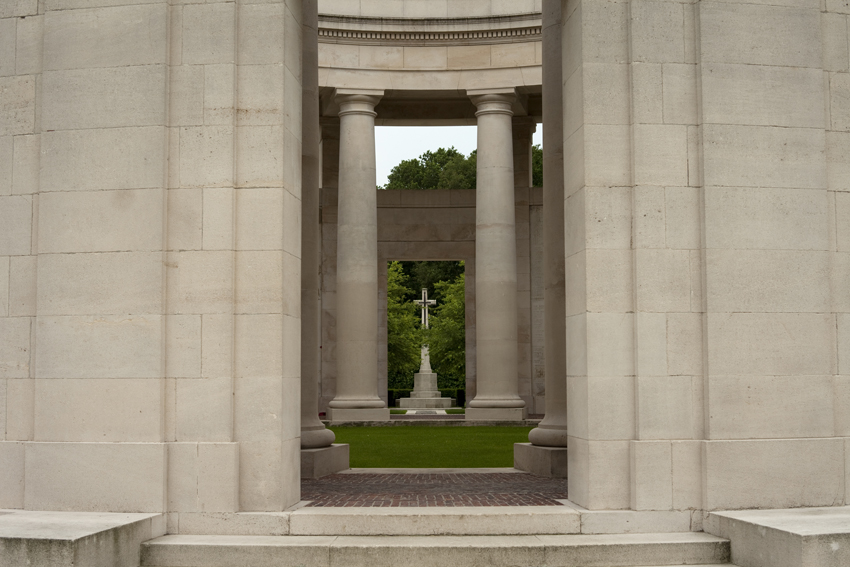
View through the centre of the memorial

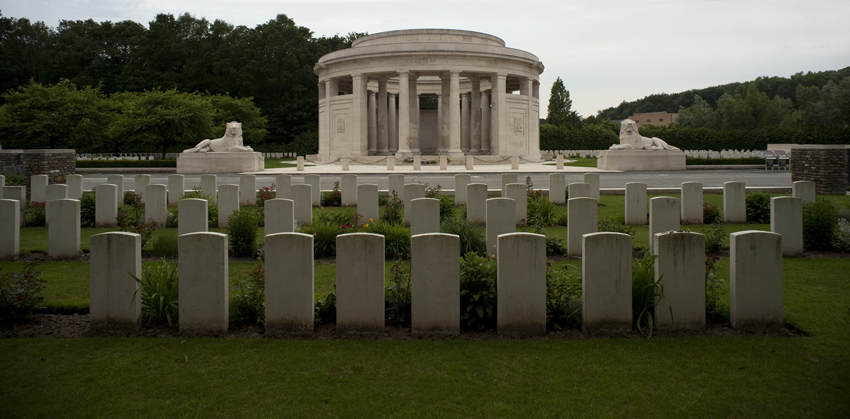
View of the memorial from the Hyde Park Corner (Royal Berks) Cemetery across the road

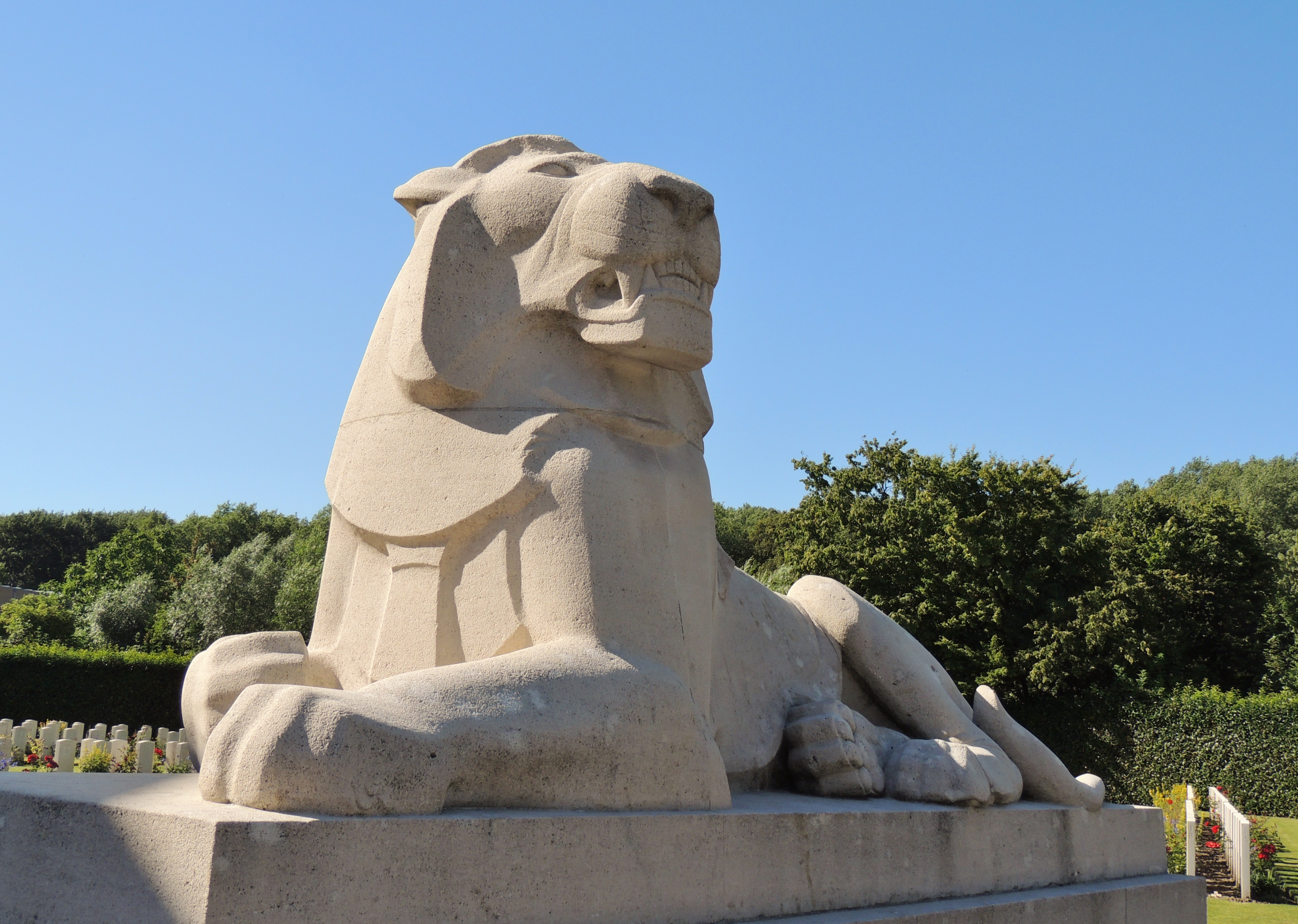
One of Gilbert Ledward's lions

== See also ==
- List of World War I memorials and cemeteries in Flanders
