= Allastair McReady-Diarmid =

- Born: 21 March 1888; Southgate, London
- Died: 1 December 1917 (aged 29) near Mœuvres, France
- Burial place: Remembered on the Cambrai Memorial
- Military career
- Allegiance: United Kingdom
- Branch: British Army
- Service years: 1914–1917
- Rank: Captain
- Units: The Middlesex Regiment
- Conflicts: World War I
- Awards: Victoria Cross

Allastair Malcolm Cluny McReady-Diarmid VC (21 March 1888 – 1 December 1917) was a British recipient of the Victoria Cross, the highest and most prestigious award for gallantry in the face of the enemy that can be awarded to British and Commonwealth forces.

== Details ==
He was 29 years old, and an Acting Captain in the 17th (S) Battalion, The Middlesex Regiment (Duke of Cambridge's Own), British Army during the First World War when the following deed took place for which he was awarded the VC.

On 30 November/1 December 1917 at the Moeuvres Sector, France, when the enemy penetrated into our position, and the situation was extremely critical, Captain McReady-Diarmid led his company through a heavy barrage and immediately engaged the enemy and drove them back at least 300 yards, causing numerous casualties and taking 27 prisoners. The following day the enemy again attacked and drove back another company which had lost all its officers. The captain called for volunteers, and leading the attack, again drove them back. It was entirely due to his throwing of bombs that the ground was regained, but he was eventually killed by a bomb.

He is commemorated on the Cambrai Memorial to the Missing.

== Further information ==
As a boy, McReady-Diarmid went to Queen Elizabeth's Grammar School for Boys, Barnet, Hertfordshire. His Victoria Cross is displayed at the National Army Museum, Chelsea, England.

== Bibliography ==
- Gliddon, Gerald (2004) [2012]. VCs of the First World War: Cambrai 1917. The History Press. ISBN 978-0-75-247668-1.
