= Lancashire Cottage Cemetery =

CWGC cemetery (World War I) in Ploegsteert, Belgium

- Commonwealth War Graves Commission
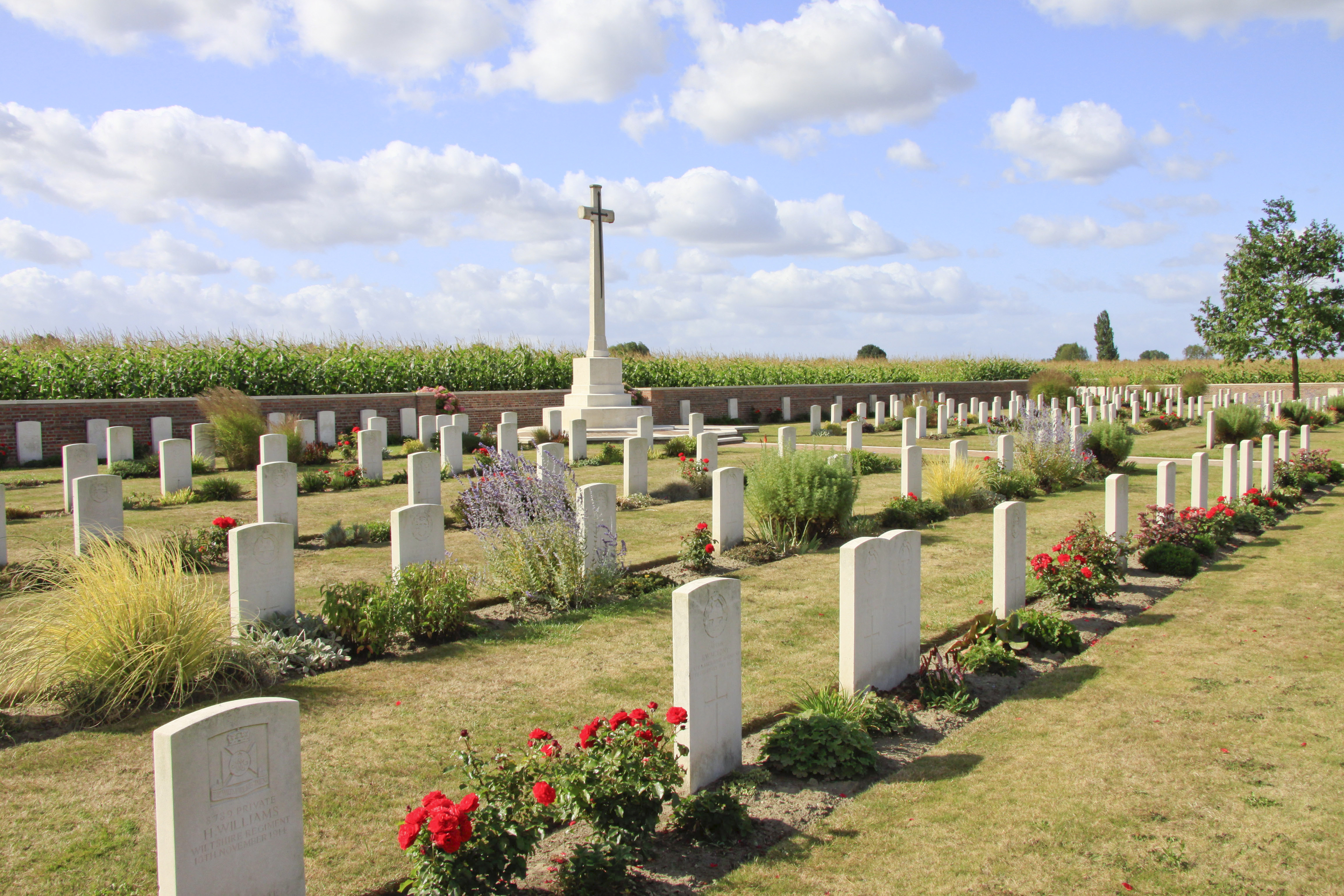
- Used for those deceased 1914–1916
- Established: 1914
- Location: 50°43′45″N 02°53′52″E near Ploegsteert, Wallonia, Belgium
- Designed by: Charles Holden
- Total burials: 269

Burials by nation
- Allied Powers: United Kingdom: 231; Australia: 23; Canada: 2; Central Powers: Germany: 13

Burials by war
- World War I: 269

Lancashire Cottage Cemetery is a British military cemetery for victims of the First World War, located in the Belgian village of Ploegsteert. The cemetery was designed by Charles Holden and is maintained by the Commonwealth War Graves Commission.

It holds the remains of several Royal Scots Fusiliers casualties.
