= Ploegsteert =

Village of Wallonia, Belgium

Coordinates: 50°43′28″N 2°52′41″E

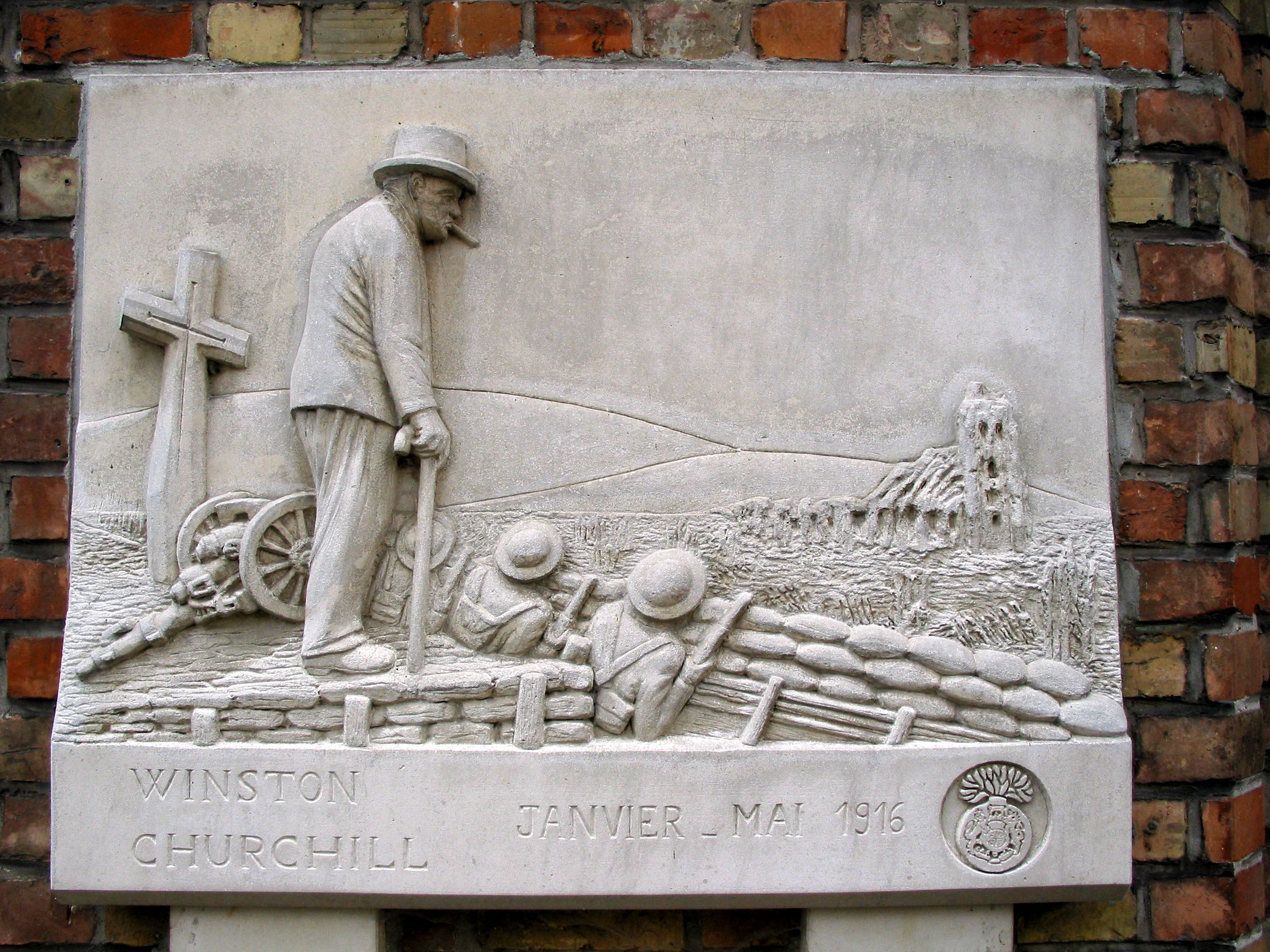
Commemorative plate for W. Churchill's command in 1916 on the front line

Ploegsteert (French pronunciation: [pluɡstɛʁ]; Dutch pronunciation: ['pluxsteːrt]; Picard: Ploster) is a village of Wallonia and a district of the municipality of Comines-Warneton, located in the province of Hainaut, Belgium.

It is the most westerly settlement of Wallonia. It is approximately 2 kilometres (1.2 mi) north of the French border. Created in 1850 on part of the territory of Warneton, it includes the hamlet of Le Bizet, which is the border with France (there is also a hamlet named "Le Bizet" in France). It is largely francophone, with facilities for Dutch speakers.

In late 1914 and early 1915, the nearby Ploegsteert Wood was the site of fierce World War I fighting. Today there are numerous cemeteries and memorials, including the Hyde Park Corner (Royal Berks) CWGC Cemetery and the Berks CWGC Cemetery Extension with the Ploegsteert Memorial to the Missing, which commemorates more than 11,000 British and Empire servicemen who died outside the Ypres Salient and have no known grave. From January to May 1916, Winston Churchill served in the area as Commanding Officer (Lieutenant-Colonel) of the 6th Battalion of the Royal Scots Fusiliers. Another nearby burial ground is the Lancashire Cottage Cemetery.

As part of Comines-Warneton, Ploegsteert was declared a sister city of Wolverton, Buckinghamshire, England, in 2006; this was partly initiated through the finding of letters from a 16-year-old soldier from Wolverton named Albert French. He is buried in Hyde Park Corner (Royal Berks) Cemetery, just outside the village.

The village is home to a carpentry museum.

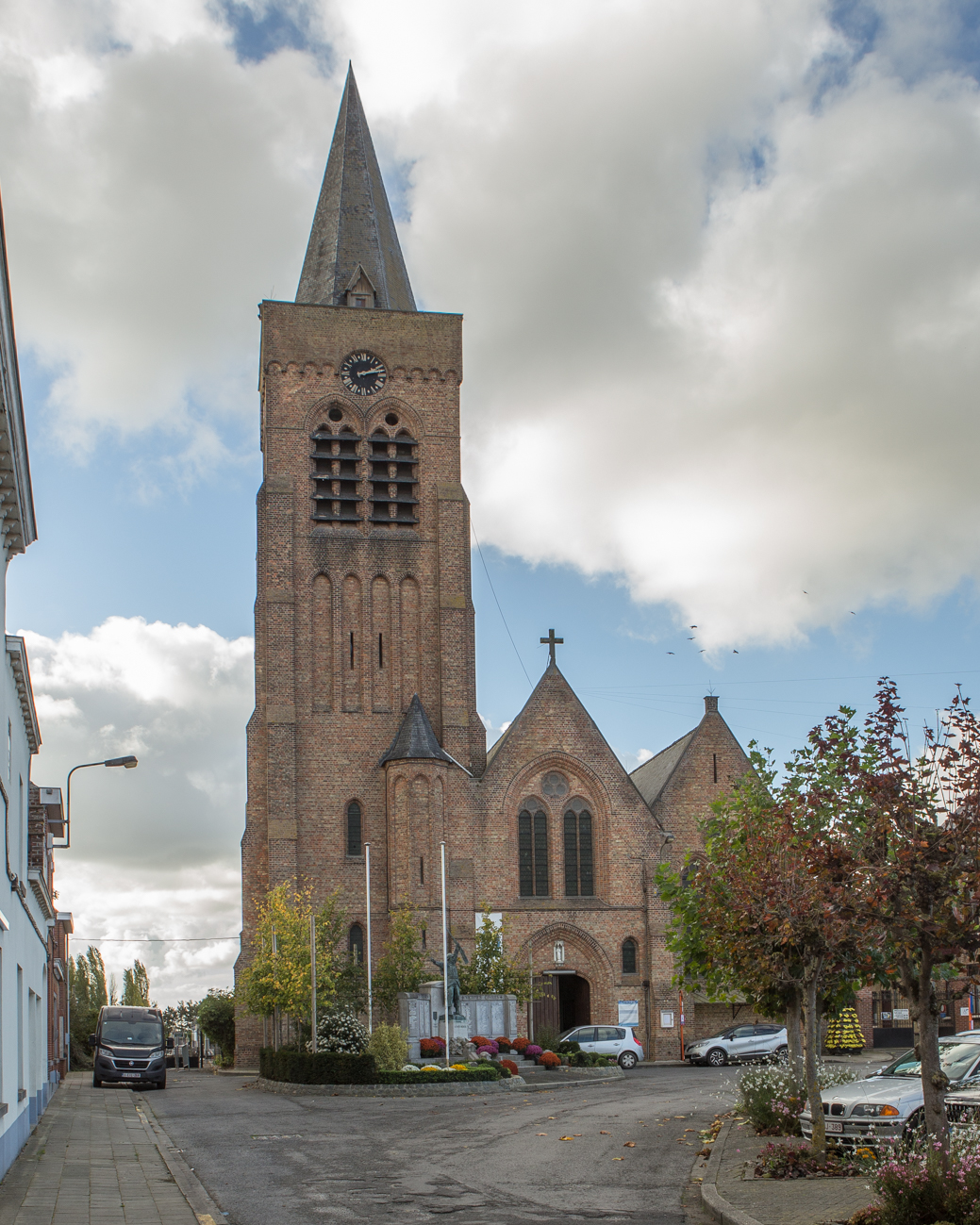
Church: l'église Saints Pierre et Paul

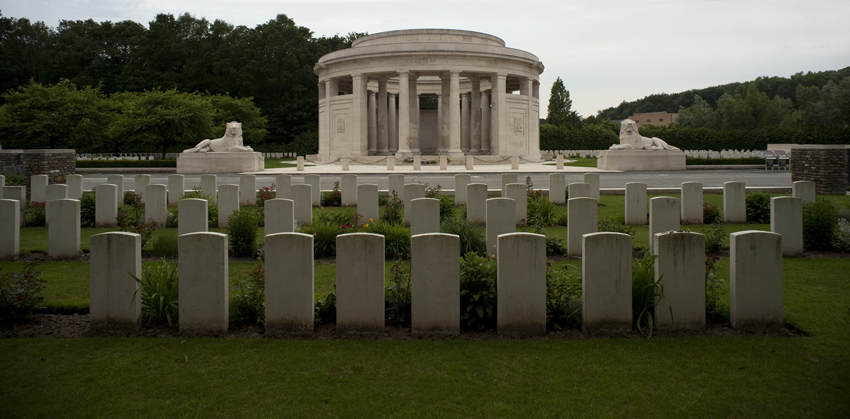
Ploegsteert Memorial to the Missing and Berks Cemetery Extension as seen from the Hyde Park Corner (Royal Berks) Cemetery across the road

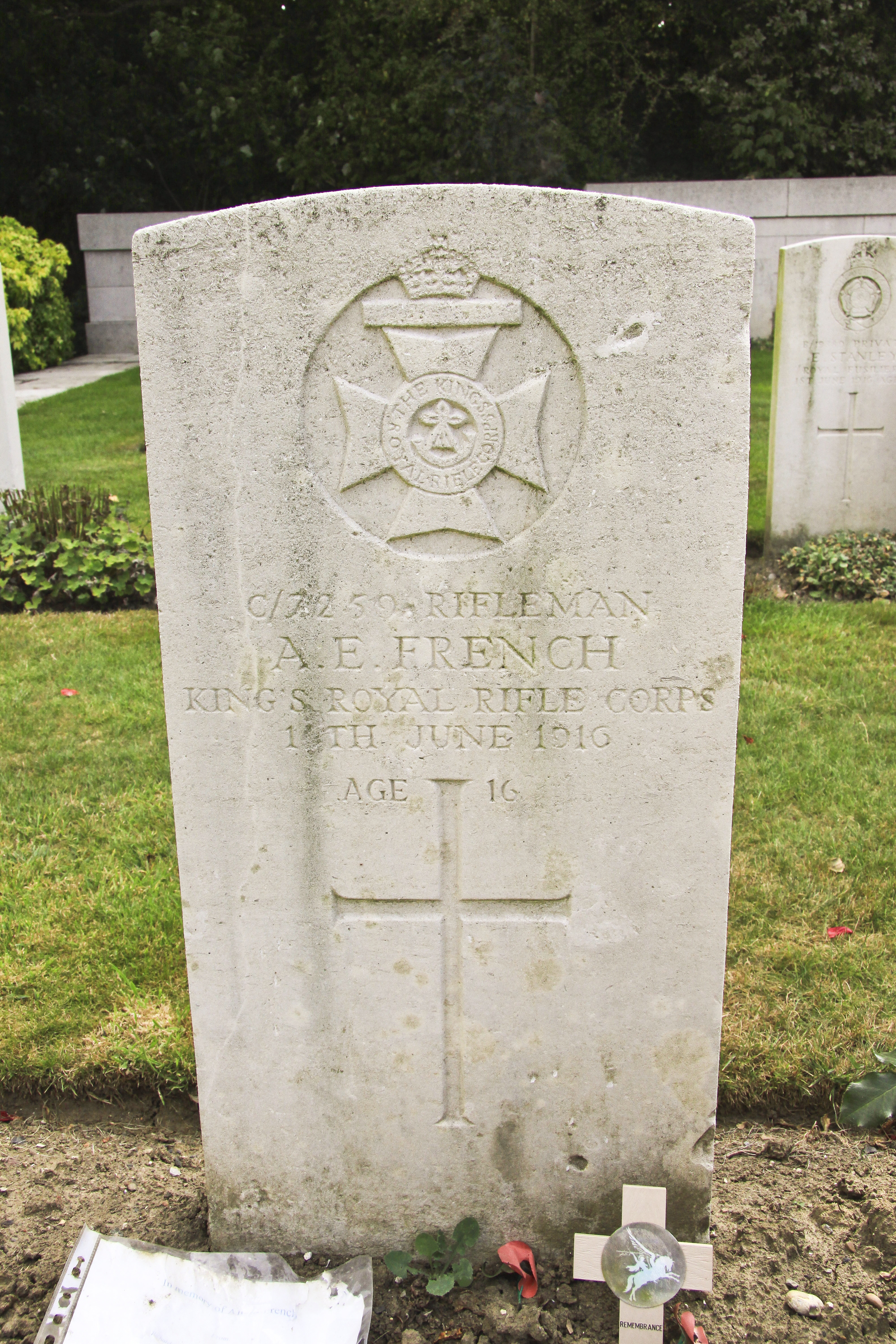
Albert French's grave at Hyde Park Corner (Royal Berks) Cemetery

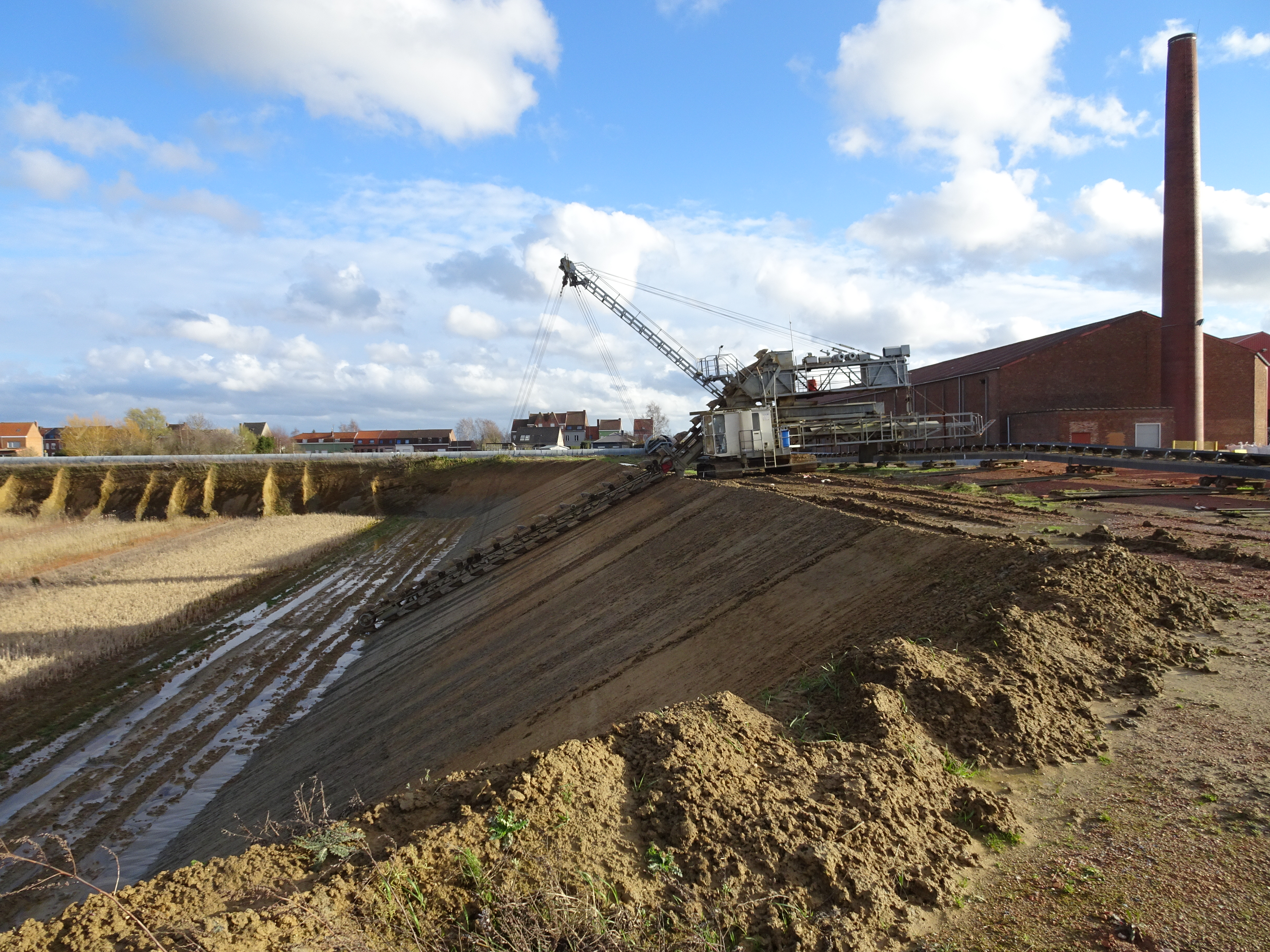
Brickworks site

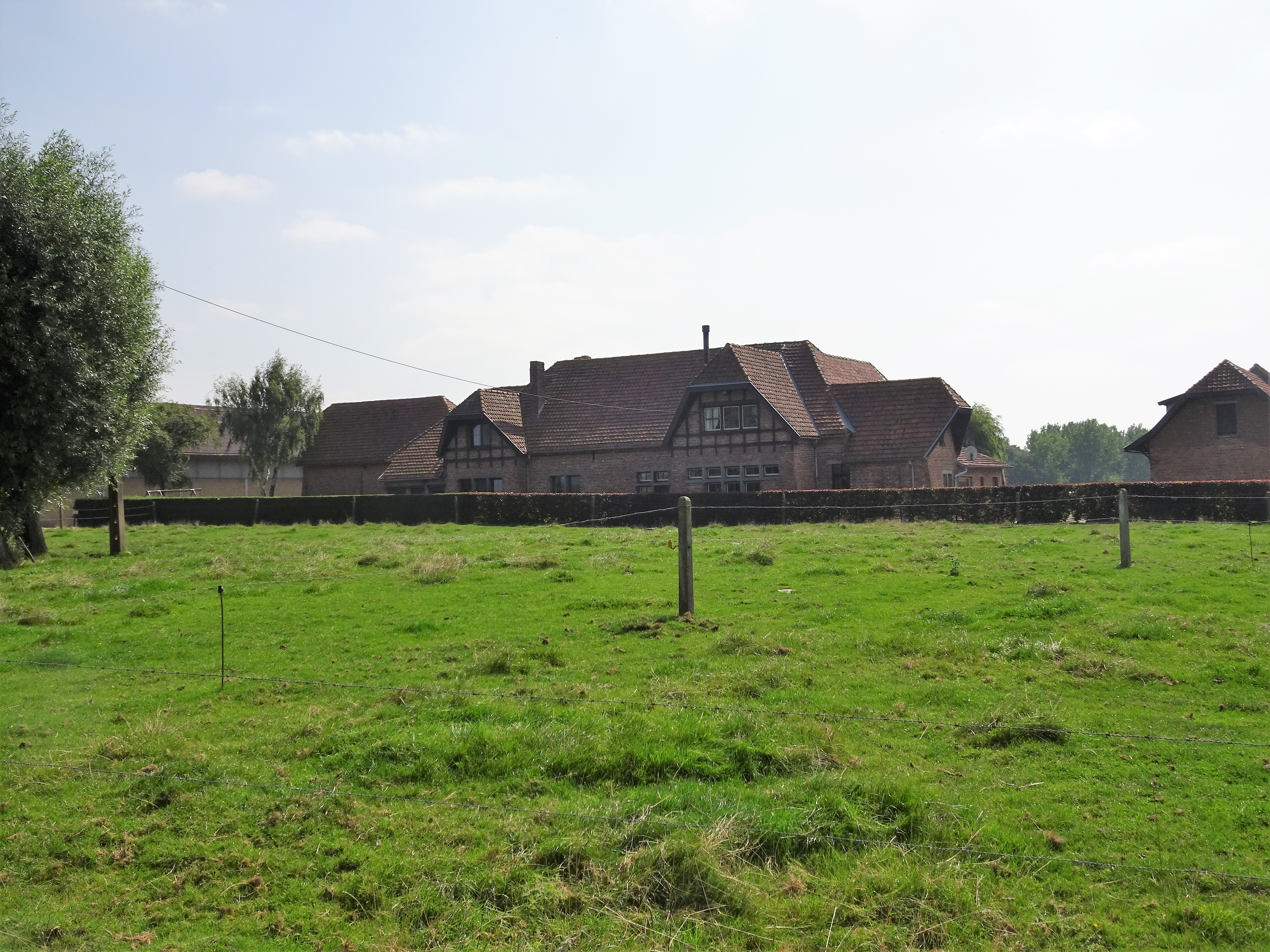
Farmhouse of Rozenberg
