= Frederick George Dancox =

Frederick George Dancox VC
- Born: 1879; Worcester, England
- Died: 30 November 1917 (aged 37–38) near Masnieres, France
- Burial place: No known grave
- Military career
- Allegiance: United Kingdom
- Branch: British Army
- Rank: Private
- Units: Worcestershire Regiment
- Conflicts: World War I: Western Front; Battle of Passchendaele; Battle of Poelcappelle; Battle of Cambrai †
- Awards: Victoria Cross

Private Frederick George Dancox VC (1878 – 30 November 1917) was a British recipient of the Victoria Cross, the highest and most prestigious award for gallantry in the face of the enemy that can be awarded to British and Commonwealth forces.

== Military career ==
Dancox was about 38 years old, and a private in the 4th Battalion, The Worcestershire Regiment, and was awarded the Victoria Cross for his deeds on 9 October 1917 at the Boesinghe sector, Belgium.

=== Citation ===
For most conspicuous bravery and devotion to duty in attack. After the first objective had been captured and consolidation had been started, work was considerably hampered, and numerous casualties were caused, by an enemy machine gun firing from a concrete emplacement situated on the edge of our protective barrage. Pte. Dancox was one of a party of about ten men detailed as moppers-up. Owing to the position of the machine gun emplacement, it was extremely difficult to work round a flank. However, this man with great gallantry worked his way round through the barrage and entered the "Pillbox" from the rear, threatening the garrison with a Mills bomb. Shortly afterwards he reappeared with a machine gun under his arm, followed by about 40 enemy. The machine gun was brought back to our position by Pte. Dancox, and he kept it in action all day. By his resolution, absolute disregard of danger and cheerful disposition, the morale of his comrades was maintained at a very high standard under extremely trying circumstances.

— The London Gazette, 23 November 1917

Dancox was killed in action near Masnieres, France, on 30 November 1917 and is commemorated on the Cambrai Memorial to the Missing. His Victoria Cross is displayed at the Worcestershire Regiment Museum in the Worcester City Art Gallery & Museum, Worcester.
