= Berks Cemetery Extension =

CWGC cemetery in Hainaut, Belgium

- Commonwealth War Graves Commission
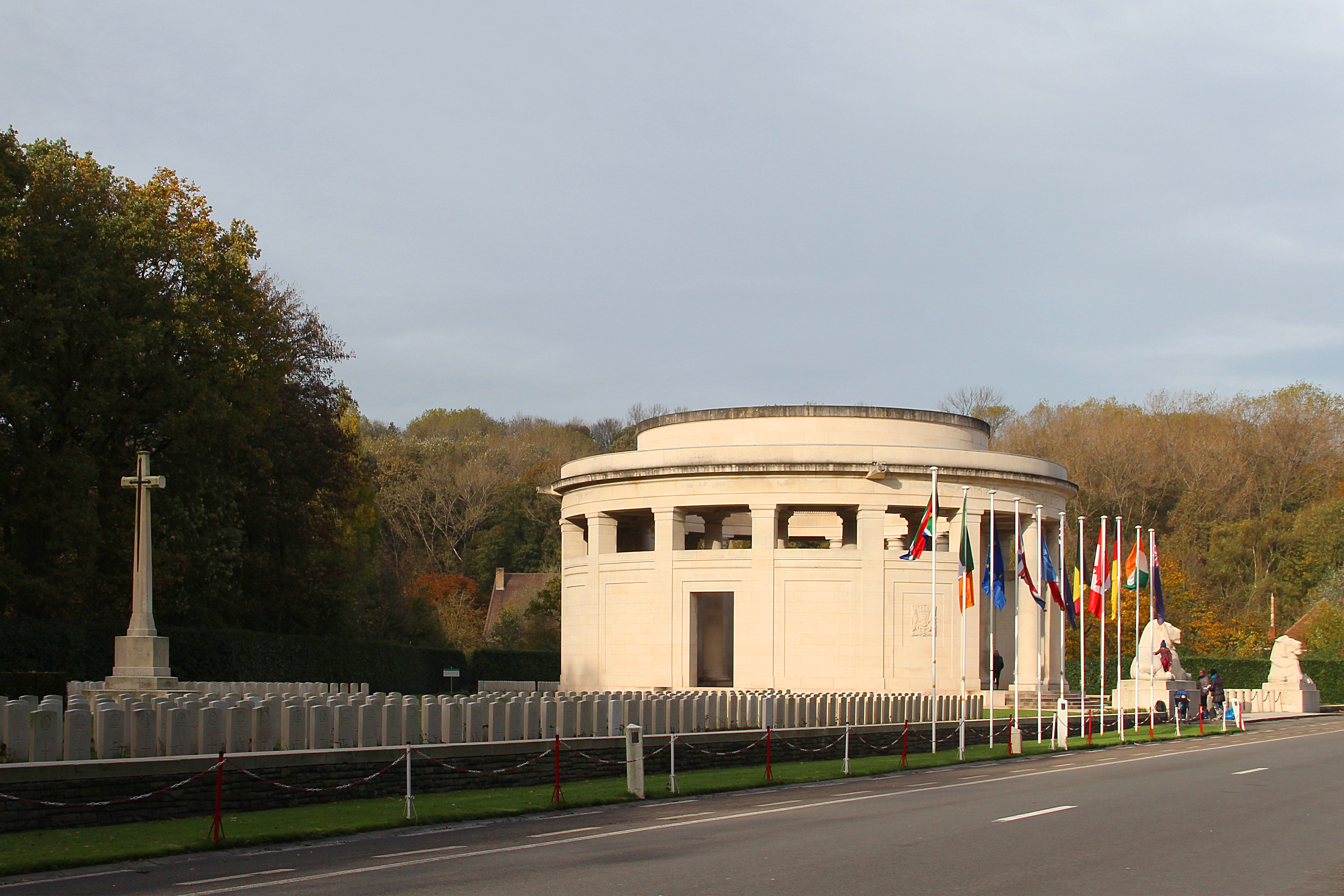
- Used for those deceased June 1916 – September 1917
- Established: 1916
- Location: 50°44′17″N 02°52′55″E near Ploegsteert, Hainaut, Belgium
- Designed by: H Chalton Bradshaw
- Total burials: 880

Burials by nation
- Allied Powers: United Kingdom: 467; Canada: 149; Australia: 180; New Zealand: 80; Central Powers: Germany: 4

Burials by war
- World War I: 880

UNESCO World Heritage Site
- Official name: Funerary and memory sites of the First World War (Western Front)
- Type: Cultural
- Criteria: i, ii, vi
- Designated: 2023 (45th session)
- Reference no.: 1567-WA10

Berks Cemetery Extension is a Commonwealth War Graves Commission (CWGC) burial ground in Belgium for the dead of the First World War, located in the village of Ploegsteert in the Ypres Salient on the Western Front.

Inside the cemetery is the Ploegsteert Memorial to the Missing, which commemorates more than 11,000 British and Empire servicemen who died in the area during the First World War and have no known grave. Berks Cemetery Extension is not to be confused with the much smaller Hyde Park Corner (Royal Berks) Cemetery, which is located directly opposite, across the road.

== History ==
The cemetery was originally set up by Commonwealth troops in June 1916 as an extension to Hyde Park Corner (Royal Berks) Cemetery across the road. After fierce fighting at the start of the war, Ploegsteert Wood had become a quiet sector where no major action took place. Units were sent here to recuperate and retrain after fighting elsewhere and before returning to active operations.

Berks Cemetery Extension was still small at the time of the Armistice. The cemetery grounds were assigned to the United Kingdom in perpetuity by King Albert I of Belgium in recognition of the sacrifices made by the British Empire in the defence and liberation of Belgium during the war.

The cemetery extension was significantly enlarged in 1930 when it became clear that Rosenberg Chateau Military Cemetery and Rosenberg Chateau Military Cemetery Extension, located approximately one kilometre away, could not be acquired in perpetuity and the graves were moved to the Berks Cemetery Extension. The current appearance of the cemetery was designed by Harold Chalton Bradshaw, who also designed the Cambrai Memorial in France.

== Gallery ==
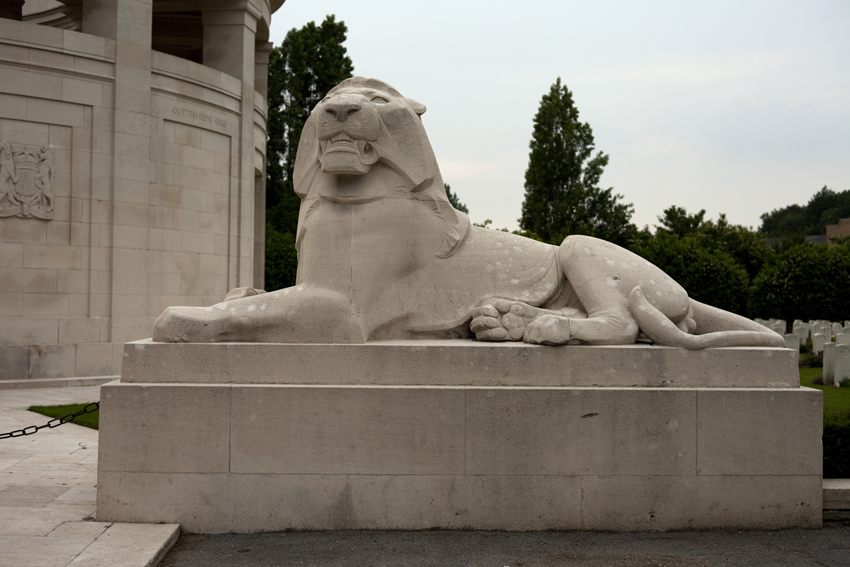

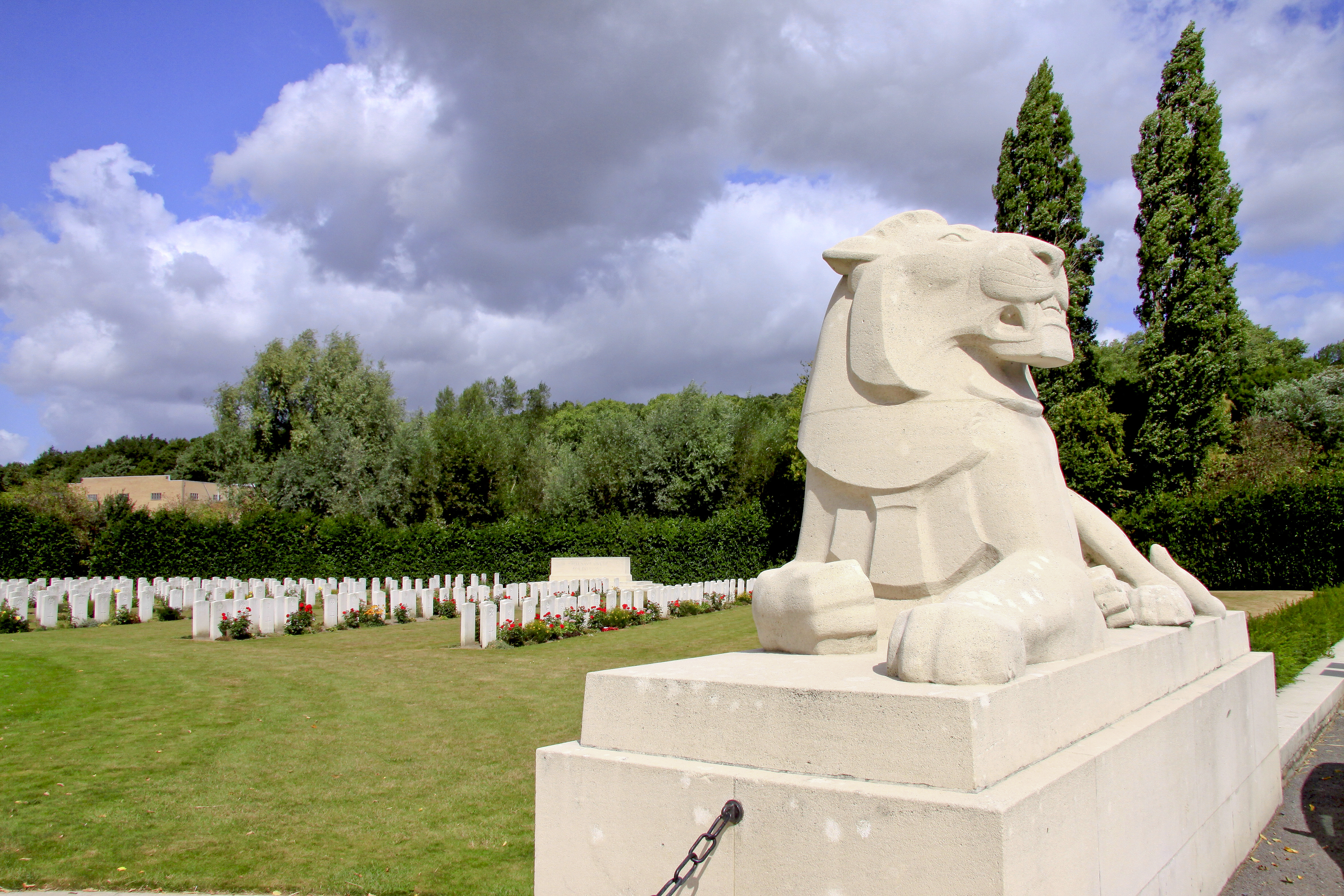

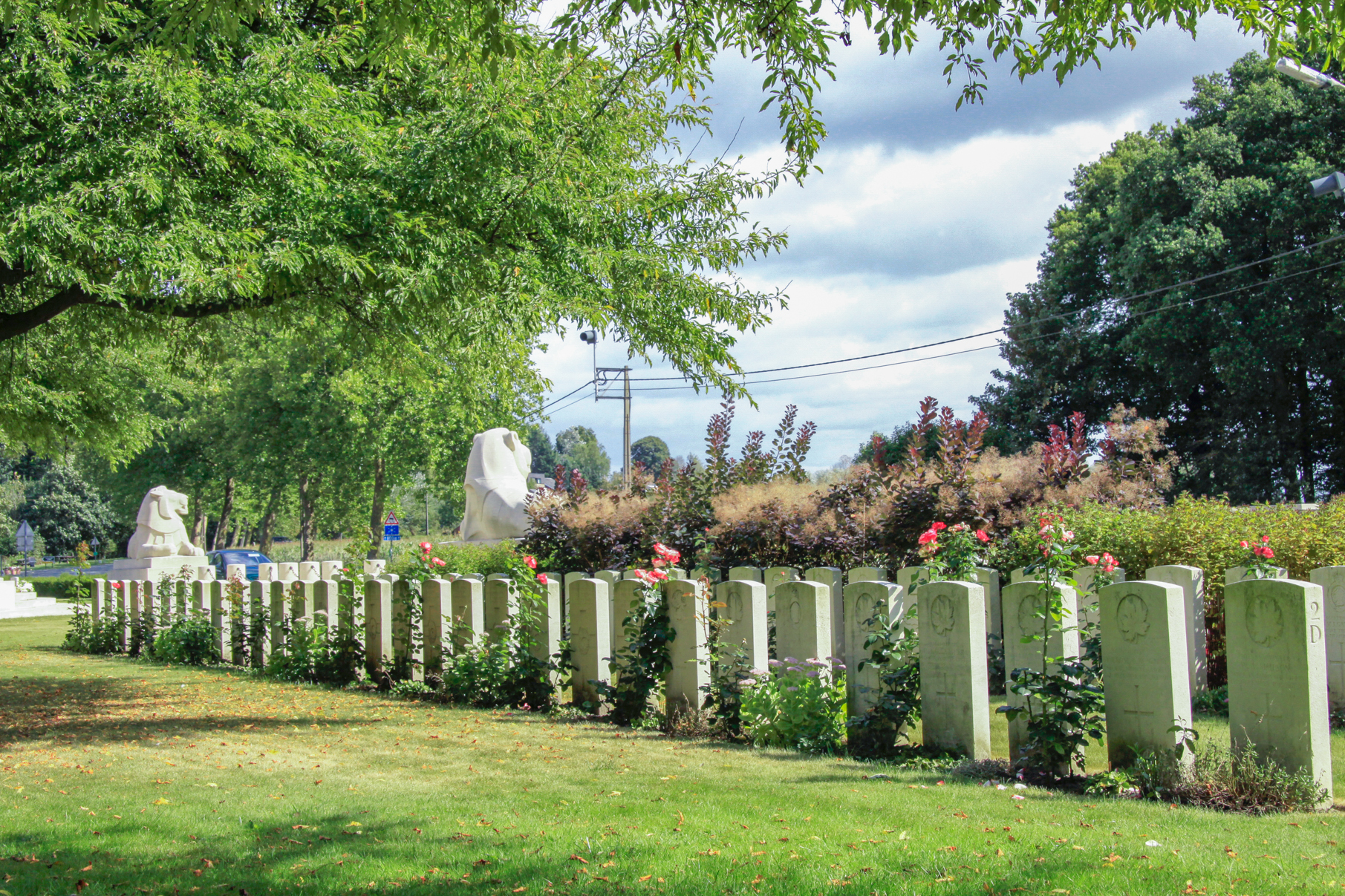

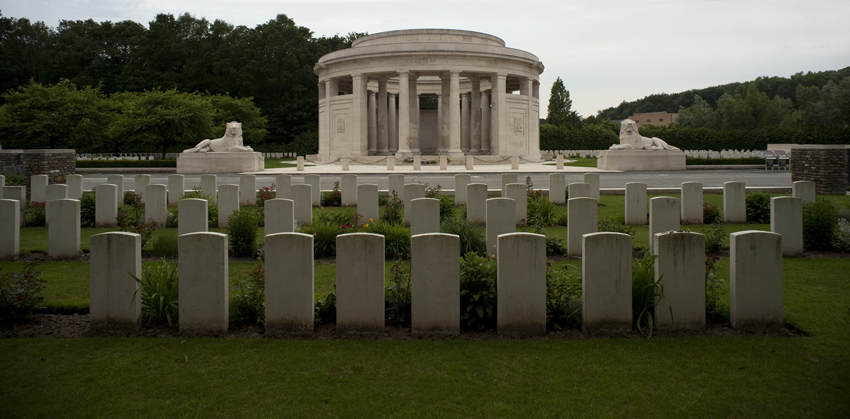
Berks Cemetery Extension and Ploegsteert Memorial to the Missing as seen from the Hyde Park Corner (Royal Berks) Cemetery across the road

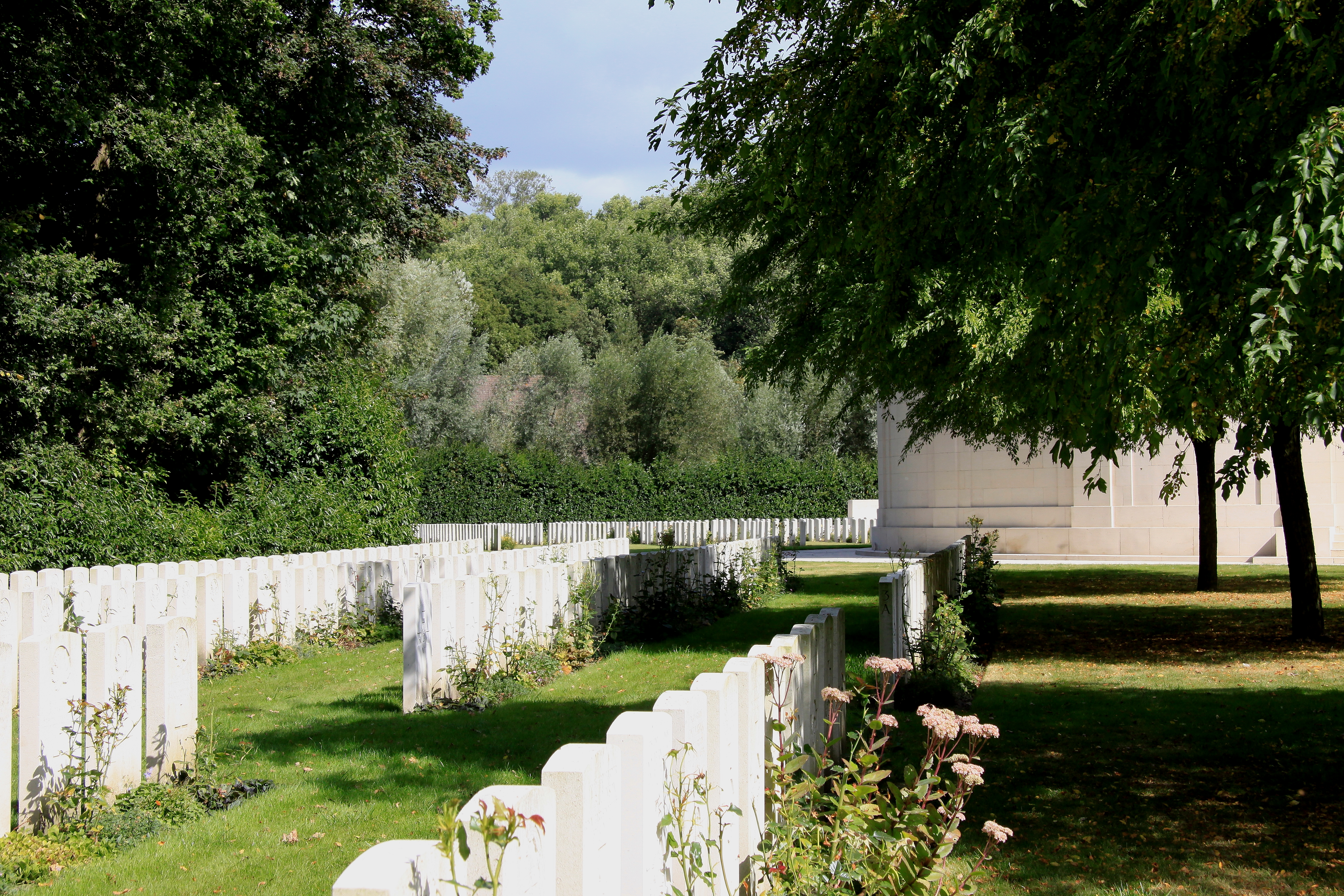
