= H. Chalton Bradshaw =

British architect

Harold Chalton Bradshaw
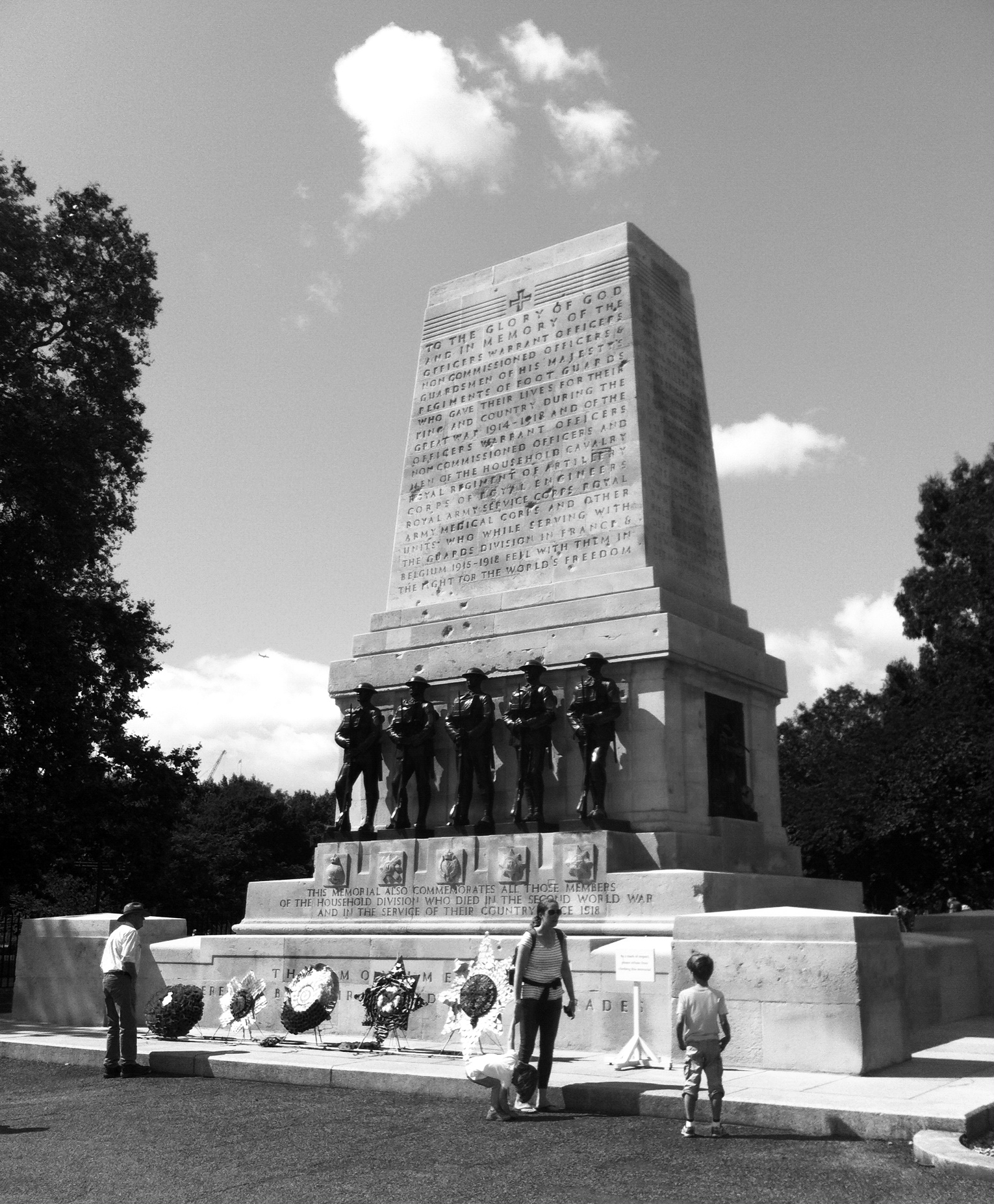
- Guards' Memorial, St James Park, 1926
- Born: 15 February 1893; Liverpool
- Died: 15 October 1943 (aged 50)
- Known for: Architecture
- Notable work: Ploegsteert Memorial to the Missing, Cambrai Memorial to the Missing
- Movement: Arts & Crafts

Harold Chalton Bradshaw CBE FRIBA (15 February 1893 – 15 October 1943) was a Liverpool-born architect, recipient of the first Rome scholarship in Architecture (1913) & first Secretary of The Royal Fine Art Commission.

His design work included the British School at Rome's Common Room (1924, as projected by Edwin Lutyens) and several Commonwealth War Graves Commission First World War cemeteries and memorials, including the Cambrai Memorial in France and the Ploegsteert Memorial to the Missing and its surrounding cemetery. He also designed the Guards' Division Memorial in St. James's Park in London.

He received an honorary Degree of Master in Architecture from the University of Liverpool in 1930, and lectured at The Architectural Association.

Bradshaw married Mary Taylor, an archaeologist, in 1918. They had three children: Christopher, a graphic designer; Julian, a physicist; and Anthony, a professor of botany.
