= Cambrai Memorial to the Missing =

Memorial in Cambrai

Cambrai Memorial
- Commonwealth War Graves Commission
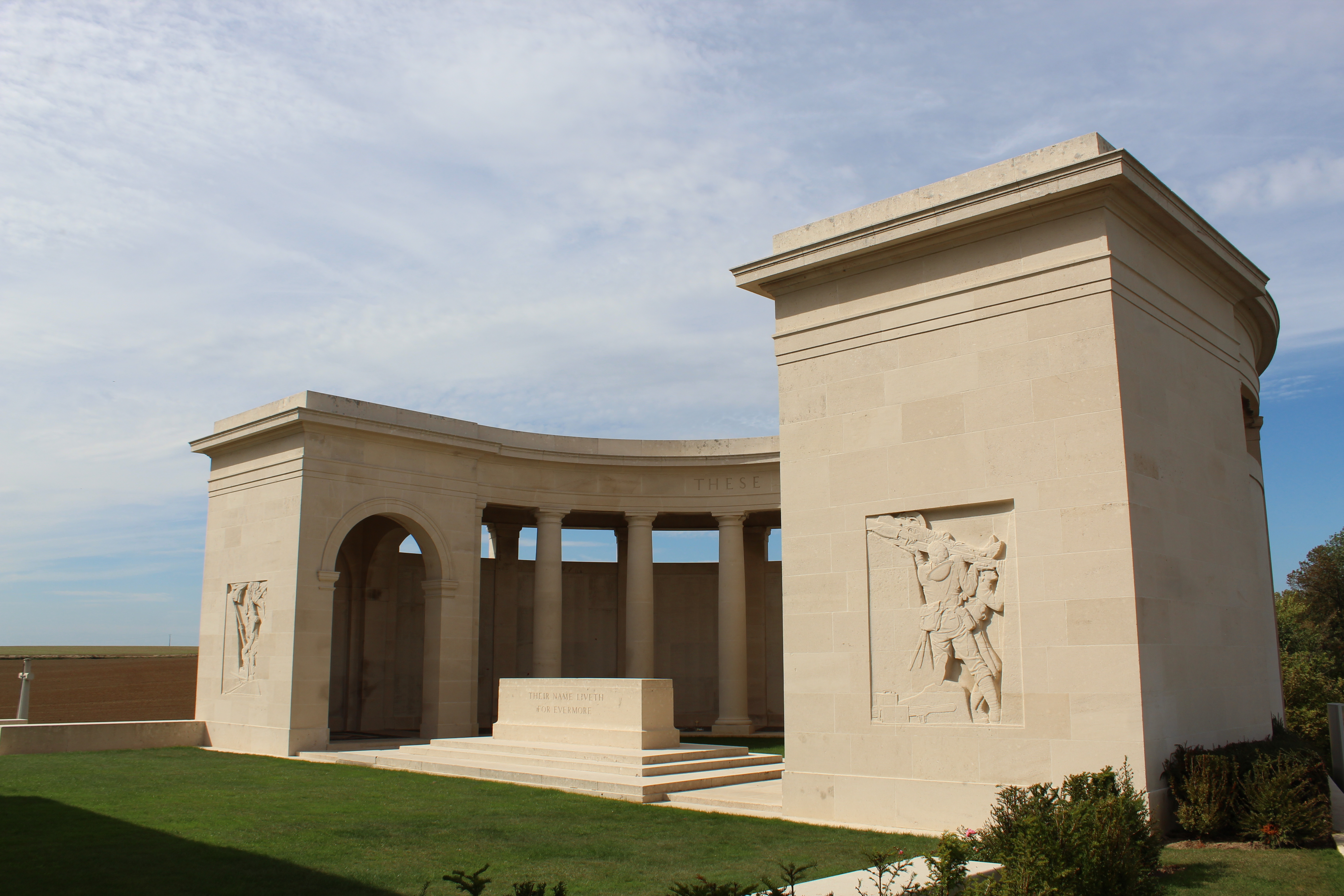
- Memorial to the missing at Louverval military cemetery
- For soldiers missing in the area during World War I
- Unveiled: 4 August 1930
- Location: 50°8′12″N 3°0′55″E near Doignies, France
- Designed by: H Chalton Bradshaw
- To the Glory of God and to the enduring memory of 7048 Officers and Men of the forces of the British Empire who fell at the Battle of Cambrai 20 Nov—3 Dec 1917 but who have no known grave. Their names are here recorded.

UNESCO World Heritage Site
- Official name: Funerary and memory sites of the First World War (Western Front)
- Type: Cultural
- Criteria: i, ii, vi
- Designated: 2023 (45th session)
- Reference no.: 1567-ND03

The Cambrai Memorial to the Missing (sometimes referred to as the Louverval Memorial) is a Commonwealth War Graves Commission (CWGC) memorial for the missing soldiers of World War I who fought in the Battle of Cambrai on the Western Front.

== Foundation ==
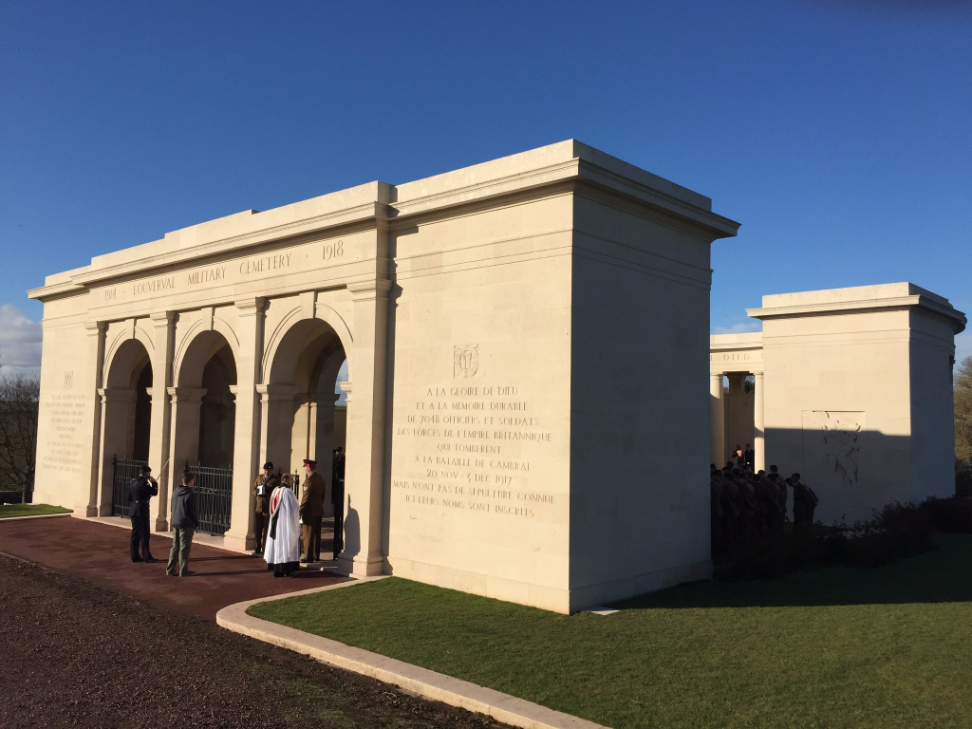
Entrance pylon at Louverval Military Cemetery on 24 November 2017 shortly before a Drumhead Service by the Royal Tank Regiment marking the 100th anniversary of the Battle of Cambrai. The memorial to the missing is in the background.

The memorial stands at one end of Louverval Military Commonwealth War Graves Commission Cemetery, which was founded by Commonwealth troops in April 1917 on the site of Louverval Chateau in northern France.

The memorial lists the 7,048 missing soldiers of the United Kingdom and South Africa who died at the Battle of Cambrai and have no known graves.

The memorial was designed by H. Chalton Bradshaw, who also designed the Ploegsteert Memorial to the Missing in Belgium, with sculpture by Charles Sargeant Jagger.

It was unveiled on 4 August 1930 by Lieutenant-General Sir Louis Ridley Vaughan.

Sculptures by Charles Sargeant Jagger

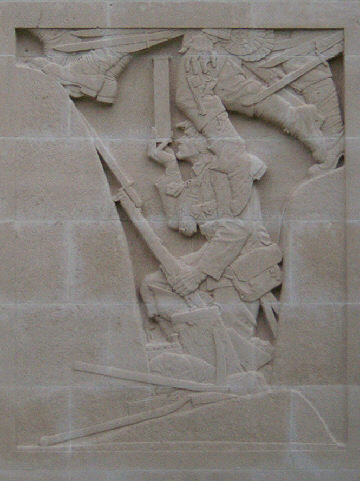
Trench periscope

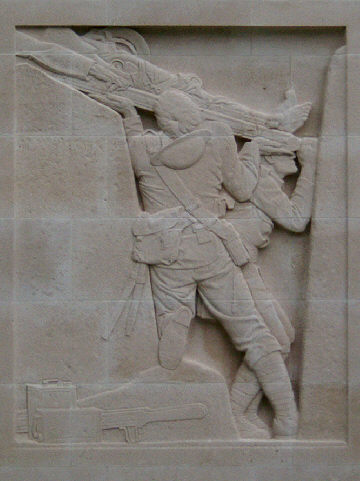
Stretcher bearers

== Notable names ==
The memorial holds the names of seven recipients of the Victoria Cross who have no known grave.

- Private George William Burdett Clare
- Private Frederick George Dancox
- 2nd Lt James Samuel Emerson
- Major Frederick Henry Johnson
- Captain Allastair Malcolm Cluny McReady-Diarmid
- Captain Walter Napleton Stone
- Captain Richard William Leslie Wain
