= General Glover =

General Glover may refer to:

- James Glover (British Army officer) (1929–2000), British Army general
- John Glover (general) (1732–1797), Continental Army brigadier general
- Peter Glover (British Army officer) (1913–2009), British Army major general
