= William Birkbeck =

William Birkbeck may refer to:

- William Henry Birkbeck (1863–1929), British Army officer and administrator
- William Lloyd Birkbeck (1806–1888), English legal scholar
