= Christopher Man =

British Army general

Major-General Christopher Man CB OBE MC
- Born: 20 April 1914; Lydden, Kent
- Died: 25 October 1989 (aged 75); Blair Atholl, Scotland
- Military career
- Allegiance: United Kingdom
- Branch: British Army
- Rank: Major-General
- Unit: Middlesex Regiment
- Commands: Infantry Junior Leaders' Battalion; 125th Infantry Brigade; 49th (North Midlands and West Riding) Division
- Conflicts: Second World War
- Awards: Companion of the Order of the Bath; Officer of the Order of the British Empire; Military Cross

Major-General Christopher Mark Morrice Man, CB, OBE, MC (20 April 1914 – 25 October 1989) was a British Army officer.

== Military career ==
Educated at Eastbourne College and Emmanuel College, Cambridge, Man was commissioned into the Middlesex Regiment on 22 June 1934. After serving with the 1st Battalion, Middlesex Regiment in the Second World War, he became commanding officer of the Army Air Transport Training and Development Centre in 1953, commanding officer of the Infantry Junior Leaders' Battalion in 1957 and commander of 125th Infantry Brigade in December 1959. He went on to be British military attaché in Seoul in 1962 and General Officer Commanding 49th (North Midlands and West Riding) Division and North Midland District of the Territorial Army from February 1964 to December 1966. From February 1967 to August 1969 he was President of the Regular Commissions Board.

He was colonel of the Middlesex Regiment from 1965 to 1966.

Military offices
Preceded by Peter Glover	GOC 49th (North Midlands and West Riding) Division; 1964–1966	Succeeded by Robert Gordon-Finlayson
