= Edward Perceval =

British Army general

Major-General Sir Edward Perceval KCB DSO
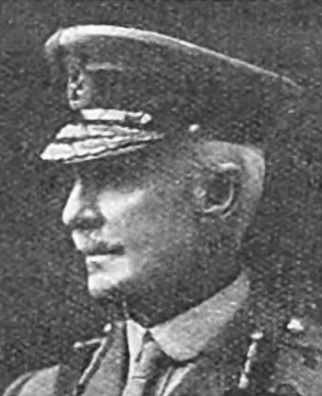
- Born: 13 August 1861; County Meath, Ireland
- Died: 26 November 1955 (aged 94); Farnham, Surrey, England
- Military career
- Allegiance: United Kingdom
- Branch: British Army
- Service years: 1880–1920
- Rank: Major-General
- Nickname: "Perks"
- Unit: Royal Artillery
- Commands: 49th (West Riding) Division; 68th (2nd Welsh) Division
- Conflicts: Second Boer War; First World War
- Awards: Knight Commander of the Order of the Bath; Distinguished Service Order; Military Order of Aviz, 1st Class

Major-General Sir Edward Maxwell Perceval, KCB, DSO (13 August 1861 – 26 November 1955) was a British Army officer who is perhaps most notable for commanding the 49th (West Riding) Division at the Battle of the Somme during the First World War.

== Early military career ==
Educated at Royal Academy, Gosport and the Royal Military Academy, Woolwich, Perceval was commissioned into the Royal Artillery as a subaltern, with the rank of lieutenant, on 19 May 1880. He was promoted to captain on 15 August 1888 (later amended to 4 August) and major on 23 February 1898.

He attended the Staff College, Camberley as a student from January 1895. From January 1897 onwards he served at the Royal Military Academy as an instructor.

He saw action in the Second Boer War, which began in October 1899, for which he was awarded the Distinguished Service Order (DSO).

After the end of the war, he returned once more to the Royal Military Academy, this time in the role of a professor from January 1903. Following this, he served a temporary appointment as a deputy assistant adjutant general before becoming a DAAG at army headquarters. In November 1905 he was promoted to lieutenant colonel and, in May 1908, after being seconded for service on the staff, he took over the post of DAAG at the Staff College, Camberley from Lionel Stopford, and received a promotion to brevet colonel in November that year. In March 1909 he succeeded Walter Braithwaite as a general staff officer, grade 1 (GSO1) at the Staff College. In December of that year he was promoted to colonel.

After serving on the half-pay list, from May 1912, Perceval was then appointed to be assistant director of movements at the War Office in London in October. In April 1914 he relinquished this position in order to become commander, Royal Artillery (CRA) of the 2nd Division, making him effectively thr senior Artillery officer of the division. With the new position came a promotion to the rank of brigadier general, although he only held this rank whilst serving in his current role.

== First World War ==
Lieutenant General Sir Douglas Haig, GOC I Corps, confers with Major General Charles Monro, GOC 2nd Division, in a street in France, August 1914. On the far right is Brigadier General J. Gough, Haig's BGGS, talking to Brigadier General E. M. Perceval, BGRA 2nd Division.

He deployed to France with the division, which formed part of the British Expeditionary Force (BEF), in August 1914, shortly after the start of the First World War. Perceval served as BGRA of the 2nd Division, under the command of Major General Charles Monro (who later became a distinguished senior commander and ended the war as commander-in-Chief, India). In this role, he participated in several of the major opening battles fought by the BEF on the Western Front, including the Retreat from Mons, the Battle of the Marne, the Battle of the Aisne, and the First Battle of Ypres.

He remained in this role until January 1915 when he took over the post of sub-chief of the general staff from Lieutenant General Sir Henry Wilson at the BEF's general headquarters (GHQ). In February he was made a Companion of the Order of the Bath (CB), "in recognition of the meritorious services".

In June he was promoted to the rank of major general "for distinguished service in the Field" and, in July, he became general officer commanding (GOC) of the 49th (West Riding) Division, a Territorial Force (TF) formation which had recently arrived on the Western Front, which he would command for over two years. Perceval commanded the 49th Division during significant battles, including the Battle of the Somme in 1916 and the Battle of Passchendaele (Third Ypres) in 1917. The division suffered heavy casualties during these battles, particularly during the attack on 3 September 1916, where fatigue and heavy shellfire contributed to the failure of the assault. He was awarded the Order of Leopold, "for distinguished services during the Campaign", by the Belgian government.

After falling ill, he returned to Britain to become GOC of the 68th Division in December 1917.

He was appointed to the Military Order of Aviz, 1st Class in October 1918.

== Postwar and final years ==
After that he became commander of the troops at Shorncliffe Army Camp in 1919. and finally retired from the army in April 1920. He was made a KCB in January 1922.

He died in November 1955 at the age of 94.

== Family ==
In 1894 he married Marian Bowles; they had one son. After his first wife died in 1896, he married Norah Mayne in 1906; they had one son and one daughter.

Military offices
Preceded by Thomas Baldock	GOC 49th (West Riding) Division; 1915–1917	Succeeded by Neville Cameron
Preceded by Raymond Reade	GOC 68th (2nd Welsh) Division; 1917–1919	Succeeded by Post disbanded
