= George Bullock (British Army officer) =

British Army officer (1851–1926)

Lieutenant-General Sir George Bullock KCB KCMG
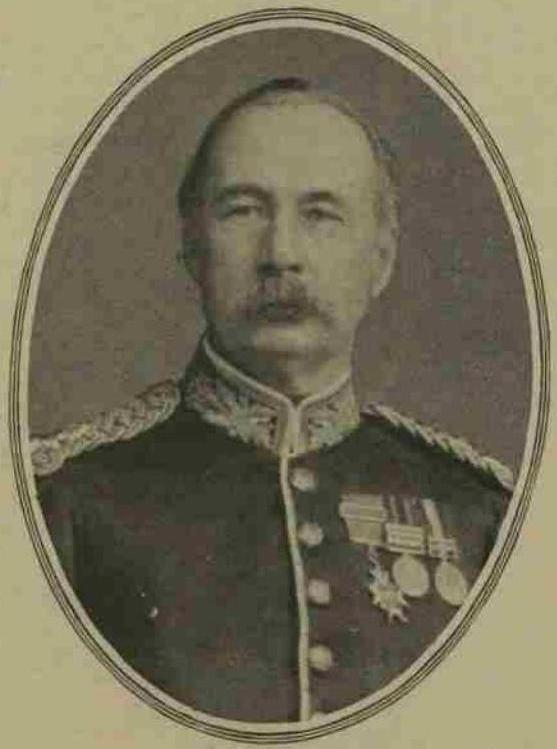
- Bullock as Governor of Bermuda, c. 1912
- Born: 15 August 1851; Warangal, British India
- Died: 28 January 1926 (aged 74); Marylebone, London, England
- Military career
- Allegiance: United Kingdom
- Branch: British Army
- Rank: Lieutenant-General
- Commands: Bermuda Garrison; West Riding Division; British Troops in Egypt
- Conflicts: Second Boer War; First World War
- Awards: Knight Commander of the Order of the Bath; Knight Commander of the Order of St Michael and St George; Mentioned in Despatches

Lieutenant-General Sir George Mackworth Bullock, KCB, KCMG (15 August 1851 – 28 January 1926) was an officer of the British Army. He served during the First World War, rising to the rank of lieutenant general, and was also the 108th civil Governor and military Commander-in-Chief of Bermuda.

== Early life and education ==
Bullock was born in Warangal, British India, on 15 August 1851, the son of Susannah Juliana née Dennis (c1814—1866) and Colonel Thomas Henry Bullock (c1808—1868), Deputy Commissioner of Berar. He was educated at Cheltenham College, University College, Oxford, and the Royal Military College, Sandhurst. He was the younger brother of Frederick Bullock.

== Military career ==
Bullock was commissioned into the 1st Battalion of the 11th Regiment of Foot as a sub-lieutenant on 24 April 1872, and attended the Staff College at Camberley in 1880. Promotion to captain followed on 22 February 1882, to major on 29 May 1891, and to lieutenant colonel on 18 January 1897. He was commanding officer of the 2nd Battalion of the Devonshire Regiment (as the 11th Regiment of Foot, in which Bullock was commissioned, was now known) who were deployed to South Africa for the Second Boer War, and in 1902 was in command at Volksrust, where there was an internment camp for the Boers. He was mentioned in dispatches (including by Lord Kitchener, dated 23 June 1902). The war ended in June 1902, and Bullock left Cape Town on the SS Scot in September, returning home. For his services Bullock was appointed a Companion of the Order of the Bath in the April 1901 South Africa Honours list (the award was dated to 29 November 1900) and he received the actual decoration from King Edward VII at Buckingham Palace on 24 October 1902.

After the sudden death of the chief staff officer in Egypt later the same year, Bullock was appointed to this position with the substantive rank of colonel on 21 November 1902. Staying in Egypt, he became brigadier general commanding Alexandria District in 1904 and general officer commanding (GOC) British Troops in Egypt in 1905. He was promoted to major general in October 1906.

After returning home, he was appointed GOC of the West Riding Division of the Territorial Force (TF) in 1910. He was promoted to lieutenant general in June 1911.

Bullock was appointed Governor and military General Officer Commanding-in-Chief of Bermuda, a strategic Imperial fortress colony (now described as a British Overseas Territory) in the North Atlantic Ocean with a disproportionately large garrison, effective 11 May 1912 (with Lieutenant Pyeec Roland Bradford Lawrence, Coldstream Guards, as his Aide-de-Camp).

Bullock is remembered as moving Government House to the centre of Bermuda's social life. The British government saw Bermuda more as a base than as a colony. Since the American War of Independence, the Royal Naval Dockyard, Bermuda had been constructed and served as the headquarters of the Royal Navy in the western North Atlantic, and the large Bermuda Garrison had been built up to defend it. Vast sums had been spent in the 19th century on fortifying the islands, and its governors were appointed almost exclusively from the general officers of the British Army, especially from the Royal Engineers and the Royal Artillery.

Bullock's predecessors had kept a distance from Bermuda's civilian population, but he made efforts to interact socially, opening Government House to prominent Bermudians and visitors, such as US President-elect Woodrow Wilson, for social functions. He also made efforts to take part in the normal social life of the colony.

When Britain declared war on Germany in 1914, during the First World War, Bullock was temporarily overseas on leave, having left on the 25 July. The commanding officer (CO) of the 2nd Battalion of the Lincolnshire Regiment (2 Lincolns), based at Prospect Camp, Lieutenant Colonel George Bunbury McAndrew, found himself acting Governor and Commander-in-Chief of Bermuda in Bullock's absence, and oversaw the colony's placement onto a war footing. His leave cancelled, Bullock returned to Bermuda on the 7 August.

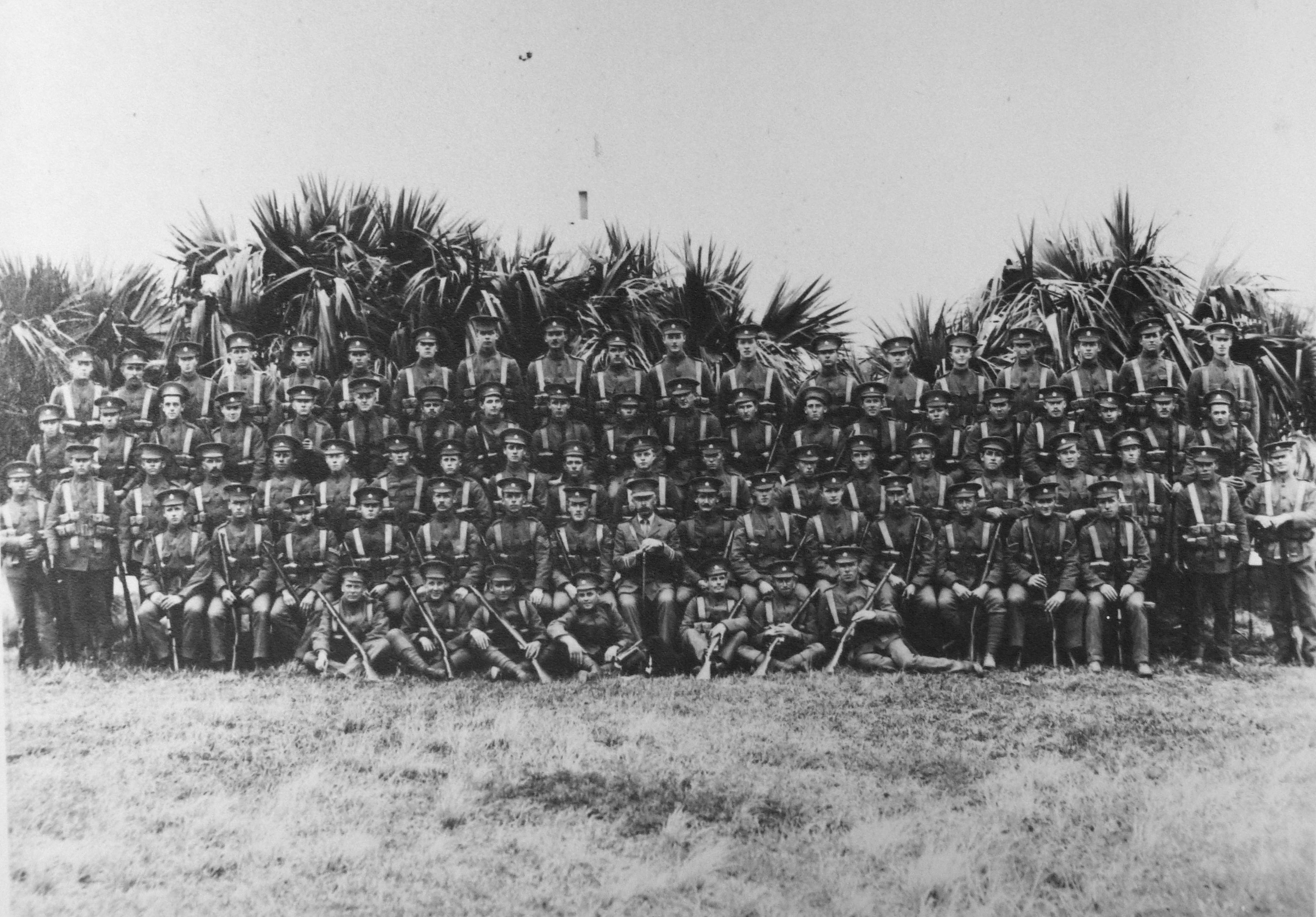
Bullock's Boys. The first contingent of the BVRC to the Lincolns, training in Bermuda for the Western Front, Winter 1914–15.

A contingent from the Bermuda Volunteer Rifle Corps (BVRC) was detached in December 1914 to train for the Front. It was hoped this could join 2 Lincolns, but when it arrived in England 2 Lincolns was already in France. It was initially attached to the 3rd Battalion, before being attached to the First Battalion (1 Lincolns) on in France as two extra platoons. It was the first colonial volunteer contingent to reach the Western Front when it arrived there in June, 1915. The contingent had trained at Warwick Camp, in Bermuda, over the winter of 1914–1915. As the BVRC still had to meet its obligations as part of the garrison, maintaining patrols and guarding key points around the archipelago, it did not have enough officers to provide an Adjutant to the cadre. Bullock filled this role himself, a job normally performed by a captain. The contingent, as a result, was popularly known as Bullock's Boys.

Bullock retired from the governorship in 1917, but retained his link with the colony when he became the head of the London based Bermuda Contingents Committee on 13 June 1917. This committee had been formed the as a non-governmental agency in 1916 by Mr. Joseph Rippon (chairman), Mr. Boswell Tucker (Hon. Treasurer), Miss Gladys Trott (who would marry Harold Trimingham) (Hon. Secretary), Mrs. Ada Mary Tucker (born Bowden, the wife of the commander of the First Contingent of the Bermuda Volunteer Rifle Corps sent to the Lincolnshire Regiment, Major Richard Jennings Tucker), Mrs. Winifred Esther Everest Kitchener (daughter of the Hon. Arthur William Bluck, Mayor of the City of Hamilton and a Member of the Colonial Parliament, and wife of Major (future Squadron Leader) Henry Hamilton Kitchener of the Royal Engineers and the Royal Flying Corps, a son of the late Governor and Commander-in-Chief of Bermuda, Lieutenant-General Sir Frederick Walter Kitchener, who had died in office and been buried at Prospect Camp in 1912), and Mrs. J. Boyd. The committee had grown out of the role Ada Mary Tucker had previously performed, visiting wounded islanders in hospital, and acting to assist Bermudian servicemen in Britain. The committee was formed with official support from the colonial government to become its agency for ensuring the welfare of all Bermudian serving overseas during the war, not simply the members of the Bermuda Volunteer Rifle Corps contingents and Bermuda Contingent of the Royal Garrison Artillery.

In his new role as head of the committee, Bullock attempted to visit both the Bermuda Volunteer Rifle Corps contingent and the Bermuda Contingent RGA on the Western Front in 1917 but was only able to locate the former (the Bermuda Contingent RGA frequently moving, and having been scattered about the front in detachments). An extract from a letter he wrote to his successor as Governor and GOC-in-C Bermuda, General Sir James Willcocks, was published in the 18 September 1917, issue of The Royal Gazette:

Bournemouth,

24th August, 1917.

"I have just come back from a short trip in France: where I saw the Bermuda Volunteer Rifle Corps Contingent attached to the 1st Lincoln Regiment.

I would like the people of Bermuda to know that all I saw, only about 20 were looking strong and healthy, and in very good spirits. The Officer Commanding the Lincolns spoke most highly of them and said that the Regiment thought they were very lucky in having them attached to them. That whenever there was a call for volunteers for any special job they were always the first to volunteer. He could not speak too highly of them.

I myself could hardly recognise them, they looked such war-hardened veterans; very different to the young looking men who started from Bermuda. They are now all machine gunners. Of course they have had severe casualties in killed and wounded. Several have got commissions and some were on leave.

I asked them if there was anything particular they were in want of, but the only thing they were anxious to get was a large supply of Bermuda cap and shoulder badges: which I will try to provide for through the Contingent Committee in London. I think the Committee have been trying to get them, but there has been some difficulty about it.

I tried to see the Bermuda Royal Garrison Artillery Contingent, but I could not find where they were, as I think they were engaged in the present offensive, and they get moved from place to place as required. I only came across one Staff Officer who had had them working under him in the 1st Army and he spoke very highly of them."

Bullock also served as Colonel of the Devonshire Regiment from 1910 to 1921.

== Family ==
Bullock married Amy Isabella née Thomson (1854–1952) in 1884; Lady Amy Bullock was invested as an Officer of the Order of the British Empire for her war work on 27 March 1918.

Military offices
Preceded by John Slade	GOC British Troops in Egypt; 1905–1908	Succeeded by Sir John Maxwell
Preceded by Archibald Wright	GOC West Riding Division; 1910–1911	Succeeded by Thomas Baldock
Preceded by Sir Walter Kitchener	GOC-in-C Bermuda; 1912–1917	Succeeded by Sir James Willcocks
Government offices
Preceded by Sir Walter Kitchener	Governor of Bermuda; 1912–1917	Succeeded by Sir James Willcocks
