= Neville Cameron =

British Army officer (1873–1955)

Major-General Neville Cameron CB CMG
- Born: 9 October 1873; Southsea, Hampshire, England
- Died: 5 December 1955 (aged 82)
- Military career
- Allegiance: United Kingdom
- Branch: British Army
- Service years: 1892−1931
- Rank: Major-General
- Service number: 21851
- Unit: Queen's Own Cameron Highlanders
- Commands: 103rd (Tyneside Irish) Brigade; 151st (Durham Light Infantry) Brigade; 49th (West Riding) Division; 16th Infantry Brigade; 12th Infantry Brigade; 49th (West Riding) Infantry Division
- Conflicts: Second Boer War; First World War
- Awards: Companion of the Order of the Bath; Companion of the Order of St Michael and St George

Major-General Neville John Gordon Cameron, CB, CMG (9 October 1873 – 5 December 1955) was a British Army officer who served with distinction in many conflicts throughout his almost forty years of military service, most notably during the First World War, serving successively as a staff officer and a brigade and division commander.

== Military career ==
Born in Southsea, Hampshire, the third son of General Sir William Gordon Cameron and educated at Wellington College and the Royal Military College, Sandhurst, Cameron was commissioned into the Queen's Own Cameron Highlanders in December 1892.

He saw action in the Sudan in 1898 during the Mahdist War. He was present at the Battle of Atbara and the Siege of Khartoum He then served in the Second Boer War, also known as the South African War, from 1900 to 1902. He served with the 2nd Brigade as its brigade major from August 1909 until September 1913. He was promoted to major on 3 April 1910 while serving in this role.

From then he was made a staff officer at the War Office in London. He became a general staff officer, grade 2(GSO2), at the War Office in London in April 1912.

Shortly after the British entry into World War I in August 1914, Cameron went to France with the 1st Division as its assistant adjutant and quartermaster general as part of the first wave of the British Expeditionary Force. Following the conclusion of this assignment, he was a General Staff Officer Grade 1 with Scottish Command and later the 34th Division, with which he fought in the Battle of the Somme in the second half of 1916, by which time he was commanding the 34th Division's 103rd (Tyneside Irish) Brigade, having assumed command of the brigade the previous December. Cameron was badly wounded by enemy machine gun fire on 1 July 1916, the first day of the Somme offensive, and his brigade sustained severe casualties.

After recovering from his injuries, he became commander of the 151st (Durham Light Infantry) Brigade, part of the 50th (Northumbrian) Division, on the Western Front in September 1916. He was promoted to brevet colonel in June 1917 "for distinguished service in the Field". After being promoted to the temporary rank of major general in October 1917, became General Officer Commanding (GOC) of the 49th (West Riding) Division also on the Western Front, taking over from Major General Edward Perceval. He commanded the division during all the major battles of the Lys offensive in April 1918 and in the Hundred Days Offensive in autumn 1918 during the final stages of the First World War.

After handing over his command in June 1919, he became commander of 16th Infantry Brigade in Ireland in January 1921. On 1 November 1923 he took over as commander of the 12th Infantry Brigade from Colonel Arthur Marindin and was promoted to temporary colonel commandant whilst employed in this role. In June 1925 he received a promotion once again to major general, this time a substantive rank, before returning to command the 49th (West Riding) Division, now reformed in the Territorial Army, again between June 1926 and 1930. He was then placed on half-pay in June 1930.

He was colonel of the Queen's Own Cameron Highlanders from 1929 to 1943.

== Bibliography ==
- Davies, Frank (1997). Bloody Red Tabs: General Officer Casualties of the Great War 1914–1918. London: Pen & Sword Books. ISBN 978-0-85052-463-5.

Military offices
Preceded by Edward Perceval	GOC 49th (West Riding) Infantry Division; 1917–1919	Succeeded by Henry Davies
Preceded by Alfred Kennedy	GOC 49th (West Riding) Infantry Division; 1926–1930	Succeeded by Reginald May
Honorary titles
Preceded by Sir Spencer Ewart	Colonel of the Queen's Own Cameron Highlanders; 1929–1943	Succeeded by James Drew
