= Robert Gordon-Finlayson (British Army officer, born 1916) =

Major-General Robert Gordon-Finlayson OBE DL
- Born: 1916
- Died: 2001 (aged 84–85)
- Military career
- Allegiance: United Kingdom
- Branch: British Army
- Service years: 1936–1970
- Rank: Major-General
- Service number: 69036
- Unit: Royal Artillery
- Commands: East Midlands District (1967–1970); 49th (North Midlands and West Riding) Division (1964–1967)
- Conflicts: Second World War
- Awards: Officer of the Order of the British Empire

Major-General Robert Gordon-Finlayson, OBE, DL (1916–2001) was a British Army officer.

== Military career ==
Born the son of General Sir Robert Gordon-Finlayson, Gordon-Finlayson attended the Royal Military Academy, Woolwich, from where he was commissioned into the Royal Artillery on 27 August 1936. After serving in the Second World War, he became Commander Royal Artillery for the 49th (North Midlands and West Riding) Division in June 1962, Deputy Quartermaster-General for British Army of the Rhine in August 1964 and General Officer Commanding 49th (North Midlands and West Riding) Division and North Midland District of the Territorial Army in December 1966. He went on to be General Officer Commanding East Midlands District in April 1967 before retiring in March 1970.

Gordon-Finlayson was High Sheriff for Nottinghamshire in 1974.

Military offices
Preceded by Christopher Man	GOC 49th (North Midlands and West Riding) Division; 1966–1967	Post disbanded
