= Henry Rodolph Davies =

British Army officer (1865–1950)

Major-General Henry Rodolph Davies CB
- Portrait by Walter Stoneman, 1919
- Born: 21 September 1865; Windsor, Berkshire, England
- Died: 4 January 1950 (aged 84)
- Military career
- Allegiance: United Kingdom
- Branch: British Army
- Service years: 1883–1923
- Rank: Major-General
- Units: Worcestershire Regiment; Oxfordshire and Buckinghamshire Light Infantry
- Commands: 49th (West Riding) Division; 11th (Northern) Division; 3rd Infantry Brigade; 2nd Battalion, Oxfordshire and Buckinghamshire Light Infantry
- Conflicts: Third Anglo-Burmese War; Tirah campaign Boxer Rebellion; Second Boer War; First World War
- Awards: Companion of the Order of the Bath; Mentioned in Despatches (9); Officer of the Legion of Honour (France); Croix de guerre (France)

Major-General Henry Rodolph Davies, CB (21 September 1865 – 4 January 1950) was a British Army officer who commanded the 11th (Northern) Division during the First World War.

== Early life ==
Henry Rodolph Davies was born in Windsor, Berkshire, on 21 September 1865, the younger son of Henry Fanshawe Davies, a British Army officer who would rise to the rank of lieutenant general. His grandfather was General Francis John Davies and his great-grandfather was Admiral of the Fleet Sir Thomas Byam Martin. The family seat was Elmley Castle, Pershore, Worcestershire. His elder brother was Francis John Davies, who later became a full general in the British Army. Henry junior was educated at Eton College, where he was proficient in Oriental languages.

== Early military career ==
Davies joined the British Army, initially being commissioned as a lieutenant into the 4th (Worcestershire Militia) Battalion, Worcestershire Regiment, in January 1883. He resigned his commission over a year later, in February 1884, and, after graduating from the Royal Military College at Sandhurst, was re-commissioned into the Oxfordshire Light Infantry (which later became the Oxfordshire and Buckinghamshire Light Infantry) as a lieutenant in August that year.

He was sent to British-controlled Burma in 1887 and to Siam in 1892, the year in which he became a captain. In 1893 he was attached to a survey unit which surveyed the passes between Burma and China and located the Crouching Tiger Pass, the Heavenly Horse Pass and the Han Dragon Pass. On completion of the team's objectives Davies remained in China to explore the Yunnan area. On his return to England he was asked to survey a potential railway route from India to the Yangtze river via Yunnan and in 1898 returned to Burma. By mid-1899 his team had travelled nearly 2,500 miles of the proposed route, mapping the terrain in detail. He wrote a book about his experiences and in 1906 was awarded the Royal Geographical Society's Murchison Award.

Davies, seconded for service under the Foreign Office in October 1898, was involved in the Tirah campaign (1897–98), where he was mentioned in dispatches, the Boxer Rebellion (1900), and the Second Boer War (1901–1902).

In July 1906 he moved from being a staff captain at the War Office to being a deputy assistant adjutant general (DAAG) there.

In September 1911 he was promoted to lieutenant colonel and ordered back to Britain to take command of the 2nd Battalion, OBLI, taking over from Robert Fanshawe.

== First World War ==
On the outbreak of the First World War in the summer of 1914, the battalion was based at Aldershot and was mobilised as part of the 5th Brigade, 2nd Division, in the British Expeditionary Force (BEF). Davies remained in command of the battalion through the first early campaigns on the Western Front, including the Battle of Mons and the subsequent Great Retreat and the First Battle of Ypres.

He was CO of the battalion until promoted to the temporary rank of brigadier general in February 1915 (his permanent rank of lieutenant colonel was advanced to colonel in September of that year) to take command of the 1st Division's 3rd Infantry Brigade from Richard Butler. He served as the brigade's general officer commanding (GOC) during heavy fighting at the Battle of Neuve Chapelle and at the Battle of Aubers Ridge and at the Battle of Loos later in the year. In June 1916 he was made a Companion of the Order of the Bath (CB). Later that same year, he led his brigade during the Battle of the Somme, specifically during the heavy fighting at Bazentin Ridge and High Wood.

He remained with the 3rd Brigade until he was transferred to the 33rd Infantry Brigade, part of the 11th (Northern) Division, as its new GOC in March 1917. In May of that year, after Major General Archibald Ritchie, the division's GOC, was wounded, Davies took command of the division. He served as the division's GOC throughout 1917 and into 1918. It was in September of that year, during the Hundred Days Offensive, where Davies was wounded in action, as the divisional diary records:

Arras. Major-General H. R. Davies, C.B., Cmd. the Division, was wounded while going round one of the forward companies, and was evacuated to C.C.S.

After returning to his command the following month, he continued to lead the 11th until the Armistice of 11 November 1918 and relinquished command when it was demobilised in 1919, by which time Davies' rank of major general was made permanent in January of that year.

During the war, Davies was mentioned in despatches eight times and rose rapidly in rank, from a lieutenant colonel to major general in just three years.

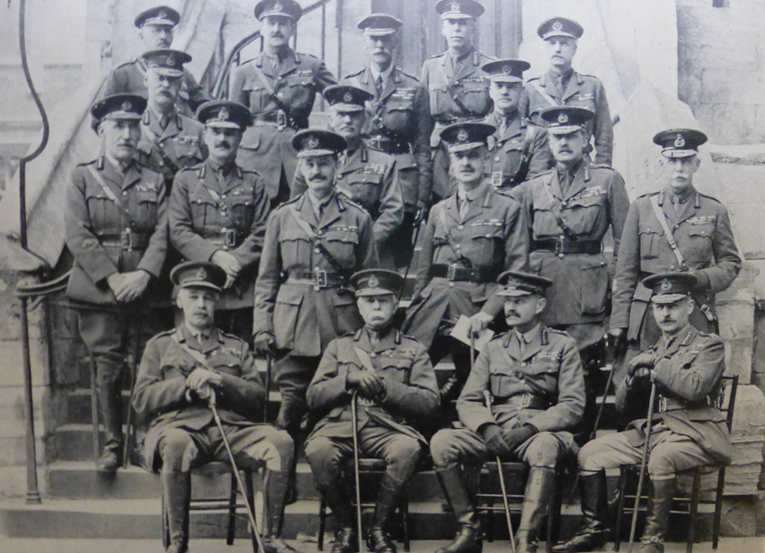
Eighteen Old Etonian generals revisit Eton, May 1919. Major General Davies stands in the middle row, third from the right.

== Post-war and final years ==
After the end of the war, Davies, awarded the Croix de Guerre in August 1919, returned to the UK and commanded the reformed 49th (West Riding) Division in the Territorial Army (TA) from June 1919 before relinquishing it due to his retirement from the army in June 1923.

He died on 4 January 1950, at the age of 84 years.

== Notes ==
Military offices
| Preceded by Archibald Ritchie | General Officer Commanding the 11th (Northern) Division; 1917–1919 | Post disbanded |
| Preceded by Neville Cameron | General Officer Commanding the 49th (West Riding) Division; 1919–1923 | Succeeded by Alfred Kennedy |
