= George Kelly (British Army officer) =

British Army general (1880–1938)

Major-General George Kelly CB DSO
- Born: October 1880
- Died: April 1938 (aged 57)
- Military career
- Allegiance: United Kingdom
- Branch: British Army
- Service years: 1899−1938
- Rank: Major-General
- Unit: King's Royal Rifle Corps
- Commands: 2nd Battalion, King’s Royal Rifle Corps; 2nd Brigade; 15th Brigade; 49th (West Riding) Infantry Division
- Conflicts: Second Boer War; First World War
- Awards: Companion of the Order of the Bath; Distinguished Service Order

Major-General George Charles Kelly, CB, DSO (October 1880 – April 1938) was a British Army officer.

== Military career ==
Educated at Wellington College, Berkshire and the Royal Military College, Sandhurst, Kelly was commissioned into the King's Royal Rifle Corps on 11 November 1899. He was severely wounded at the Battle of the Tugela Heights in South Africa in February 1900 during the Second Boer War.

During the First World War he served as commanding officer of the 2nd Battalion, King’s Royal Rifle Corps from September 1917 to March 1918 when, towards the end of the month, he was promoted to the temporary rank of brigadier general and became commander of the 2nd Infantry Brigade. He led his brigade in the German spring offensive and Hundred Days Offensive, during which he was wounded again in September 1918.

He became commander of 15th Infantry Brigade in April 1932, was promoted to major general on 16 July 1934, and then became General Officer Commanding the 49th (West Riding) Infantry Division in September 1935 before his death in April 1938.

Military offices
Preceded by George Jackson	GOC 49th (West Riding) Infantry Division; 1935–1938	Succeeded by Pierse Mackesy
