= Alfred Kennedy (British Army officer) =

British Army general

Major-General Alfred Kennedy CB CMG
- Kennedy in 1917
- Born: Alfred Alexander Kennedy; 1870; Ulverston, England
- Died: 1926 (aged 55); York, England
- Military career
- Branch: British Army
- Rank: Major-General
- Commands: 4th Cavalry Division; 49th (West Riding) Infantry Division
- Conflicts: First World War
- Awards: Companion of the Order of the Bath; Companion of the Order of St Michael and St George

Major-General Alfred Alexander Kennedy CB CMG (1870–1926) was a British Army officer.

== Military career ==
Kennedy was commissioned into the 3rd The King's Own Hussars on 10 October 1891. He was promoted to lieutenant on 16 November 1892, and to captain on 23 May 1896.

After transferring to British India, he was in March 1901 appointed aide-de-camp to Lieutenant-General Sir George Luck, Commanding the Forces, Bengal Command, and from April the same year also held a temporary appointment as Assistant Military Secretary to the command. In July he was promoted to major.

In April 1913 he was promoted to lieutenant colonel, and appointed a Companion of the Order of St Michael and St George in February 1915.

In May 1915, during the First World War, Kennedy was promoted to the temporary rank of brigadier general and succeeded Brigadier General Charles Kavanagh in command of the 7th Cavalry Brigade. He was made a substantive colonel in April 1917 and later commanded the 4th Cavalry Division at the Battle of Cambrai in November 1917 and, after becoming commander of the 230th Infantry Brigade in July 1918, he commanded the brigade in the Hundred Days Offensive.

After the war he was promoted to substantive major general in June 1919 and served as a military governor in occupied German territory and then in June 1923 became GOC 49th (West Riding) Infantry Division in succession to Major General Henry Rodolph Davies before his death in March 1926.

He was colonel of the 3rd The King's Own Hussars, in succession to General Lord Byng, from January 1924 until his death in 1926.

== Family ==
In 1898, he married Dora Campbell, daughter of Walter Thomas Rowley.

== Sources ==
- Becke, Archibald F. (1936). Order of Battle of Divisions Part 2A. The Territorial Force Mounted Divisions and the 1st-Line Territorial Force Divisions (42–56). London: HMSO. OCLC 4405016.

Military offices
Preceded by Henry Davies	GOC 49th (West Riding) Infantry Division; 1923–1926	Succeeded by Neville Cameron
