= George Jackson (British Army officer) =

British Army general (1876–1958)

Major-General George Jackson CB CMG DSO*
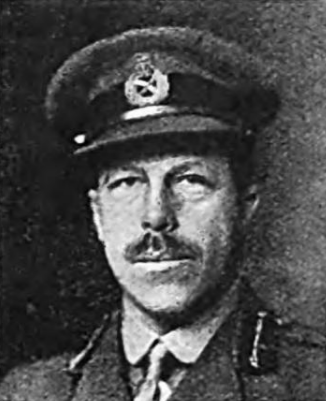
- Born: 20 December 1876
- Died: 4 September 1958 (aged 81); Kenya
- Military career
- Allegiance: United Kingdom
- Branch: British Army
- Service years: 1897−1935
- Rank: Major-General
- Unit: Border Regiment
- Commands: 87th Infantry Brigade; 7th Infantry Brigade; 49th (West Riding) Infantry Division
- Conflicts: Second Boer War; First World War
- Awards: Companion of the Order of the Bath; Companion of the Order of St Michael and St George; Distinguished Service Order & Bar

Major-General George Hanbury Noble Jackson, CB, CMG, DSO & Bar (20 December 1876 – 4 September 1958) was a British Army officer.

== Military career ==
Educated at Neuenhein College, Heidelberg and the Royal Military College, Sandhurst, Jackson was commissioned into the Border Regiment on 20 February 1897. He was seconded in November 1899 to serve as adjutant of the Imperial Light Infantry in South Africa during the Second Boer War, and took part in the expedition to relieve Ladysmith seeing action at the Battle of Spion Kop in January 1900 and at the Battle of the Tugela Heights in February 1900. He was wounded but soon returned for duty.

He was promoted on 15 March 1907 to captain.

He served initially as a staff officer and then as commander of the 87th Infantry Brigade from January 1918 during the First World War.

He became commander of 7th Infantry Brigade at Salisbury Plain in November 1923 and General Officer Commanding the 49th (West Riding) Infantry Division in September 1931 before retiring in September 1935.

Jackson was appointed a Companion of the Order of St Michael and St George (CMG) in the 1917 Birthday Honours for services rendered in connection with military operations in the field, and appointed a Companion of the Order of the Bath (CB) in the 1926 Birthday Honours.

== Family ==
In 1917, he married Eileen Dudgeon.

Military offices
Preceded by Reginald May	GOC 49th (West Riding) Infantry Division; 1931–1935	Succeeded by George Kelly
