= Theodore Birkbeck =

British Army general

Major-General Theodore Birkbeck CB CBE DSO
- Birbeck in 1962
- Born: 1911
- Died: 1976 (aged 64−65)
- Military career
- Allegiance: United Kingdom
- Branch: British Army
- Service years: 1932−1966
- Rank: Major-General
- Service number: 44960
- Unit: Border Regiment
- Commands: 11th (Kenya) Bn, King's African Rifles; 3rd Bn, Parachute Regiment; 70th East African Infantry Brigade; 49th (North Midlands and West Riding) Division
- Conflicts: Second World War; Palestine Emergency; Mau Mau Uprising
- Awards: Companion of the Order of the Bath; Commander of the Order of the British Empire; Distinguished Service Order

Major-General Theodore Henry Birkbeck, CB, CBE, DSO (1911–1976) was a British Army officer.

== Military career ==
Born the son of Major-General Sir William Birkbeck and Mabel Shaw, Birkbeck was transferred from a Territorial Army commission into the Border Regiment on 17 November 1932. He saw action in operations against the Italian Army in Somaliland during the East African campaign and then as commanding officer of the 11th (Kenya) Battalion, King's African Rifles, in Burma in autumn 1944 during the Burma campaign of the Second World War.

After the war he became commanding officer of the 3rd Battalion, the Parachute Regiment in Palestine during the Palestine Emergency in 1947, commander of 70th East African Infantry Brigade in August 1955 during the Mau Mau Uprising and Deputy Military Secretary at the War Office in December 1958. He went on to be General Officer Commanding 49th (North Midlands and West Riding) Division and North Midland District of the Territorial Army in July 1960 and Director-General of the Territorial Army in September 1962 before retiring in February 1966.

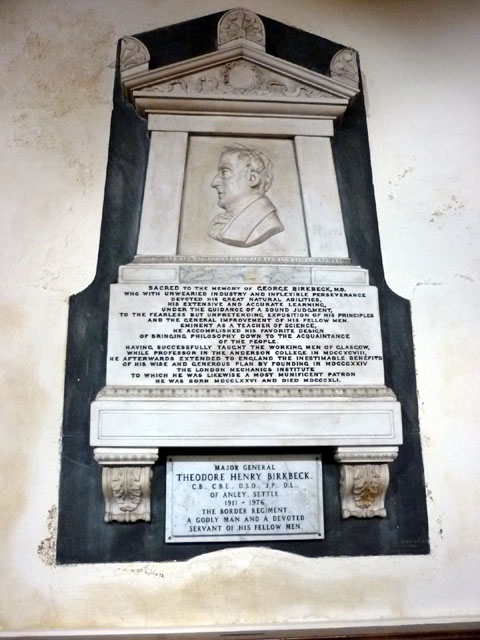
Memorial in St Alkelda's Church, Giggleswick

Military offices
Preceded by Richard Goodwin	GOC 49th (North Midlands and West Riding) Division; 1960–1962	Succeeded by Peter Glover
