= Thomas Baldock =

British Army officer

Major-General Thomas Baldock CB
- Born: 12 January 1854; Portsea, Portsmouth, Hampshire, England
- Died: 28 August 1937 (aged 83); Bodmin, Cornwall, England
- Military career
- Allegiance: United Kingdom
- Branch: British Army
- Service years: 1873–1916
- Rank: Major-General
- Unit: Royal Artillery
- Commands: West Riding Division
- Conflicts: Second Boer War; First World War
- Awards: Companion of the Order of the Bath

Major-General Thomas Stanford Baldock CB (January 1854 – August 1937) was a British Army officer.

== Military career ==
Baldock was born Portsea, Portsmouth, Hampshire, in January 1854, the son of William Baldock. After being educated at Cheltenham College and the Royal Military Academy, Woolwich, he was commissioned into the Royal Artillery in April 1873. He was promoted to captain in 1882 and major in 1890 and he graduated from the Staff College, Camberley in 1889.

He was promoted to lieutenant colonel in January 1899.

He saw action in the Second Boer War and subsequently commanded a column of Royal Artillery Mounted Rifles in South Africa for which he was appointed a Companion of the Order of the Bath.

He was promoted to brevet colonel on 1 January 1903, and later served as a member of the ordnance committee, after which he was placed on half-pay in July 1906. His colonel's rank was made substantive in February 1907. After returning to normal pay, in March he became commandant of School for Royal Horse and Royal Field Artillery. He then became commander, Royal Artillery (CRA) for Aldershot Command in August 1907.

In January 1910, and by then CRA of the 2nd Division, he was promoted to major general. He then became general officer commanding (GOC) of the West Riding Division, one of the fourteen divisions of the part-time Territorial Force (TF), in September 1911.

After taking his division to France in April 1915, eight months after the British entry into World War I, he remained in command of the division after it moved to the Western Front. Shortly after arrival, it was redesignated as the 49th (West Riding) Division. According to the diary of the 49th Division's Adjutant and Quartermaster-General (A&QMG), it was on 16 July 1915, while Baldock was at his division's advanced headquarters at Trois Tours, northwest of Ypres, Belgium, near Brielen, where he was severely wounded in the head by shell fire. The A&QMG's diary records that: "Château des Trois Tours. Friday 16th. The Germans shelled Ing. Bde. and Art. Bde H.Q.'s in the morning. At 4:15 pm. they suddenly fired 5 or 6 salvos of shrapnel and H.E. into Trois Tours Château grounds. General Baldock was outside at the time and in endeavouring to get back into the house, whilst the shelling was in progress, was wounded severely in the head by a fragment of shell. He was carried into a dugout and his wound was dressed by a medical officer. He was afterwards removed in a motor car to No.10 Clearing Hospital at Poperinghe."

His injuries forced him into retirement from the army in January 1916 and he eventually settled in Cornwall, where he died in August 1937, at the age of 83.

== Bibliography ==
- Davies, Frank (1997). Bloody Red Tabs: General Officer Casualties of the Great War 1914–1918. London: Pen & Sword Books. ISBN 978-0-85052-463-5.

Military offices
Preceded by George Bullock	GOC West Riding Division; 1911–1915	Succeeded by Edward Perceval
