= Archibald Wright (British Army officer) =

Brigadier-General Archibald Wright CB
- Military career
- Allegiance: United Kingdom
- Branch: British Army
- Rank: Brigadier-General
- Commands: West Riding Division
- Conflicts: Second Boer War; First World War
- Awards: Companion of the Order of the Bath

Brigadier-General Archibald John Arnott Wright, CB (19 January 1851 – 18 January 1943) was a British Army officer.

== Military career ==
Wright was commissioned into the 30th Regiment of Foot on 22 October 1870. He was promoted to lieutenant on 28 October 1871, and to captain on 10 November 1880.

He became adjutant of the 3rd (Militia) Battalion, the East Lancashire Regiment in September 1890.

He saw action during the Second Boer War for which he was appointed a Companion of the Order of the Bath.

Following the end of this war, he was on 30 October 1902 promoted to colonel and appointed in command of the 15th Regimental District, headquarter of the East Yorkshire Regiment based in Beverley. After commanding a district in South Africa, he was promoted to temporary brigadier general in January 1906 and took command of a grouped regimental district.

On 1 April 1908 he was appointed the first general officer commanding (GOC) of the newly formed West Riding Division of the Territorial Force (TF), and then commanded a brigade during the First World War.

Military offices
New title	GOC West Riding Division; 1908–1910	Succeeded by George Bullock
