= William Birkbeck (British Army officer) =

British Army general (1863–1929)

Major-General Sir William Birkbeck KCB CMG
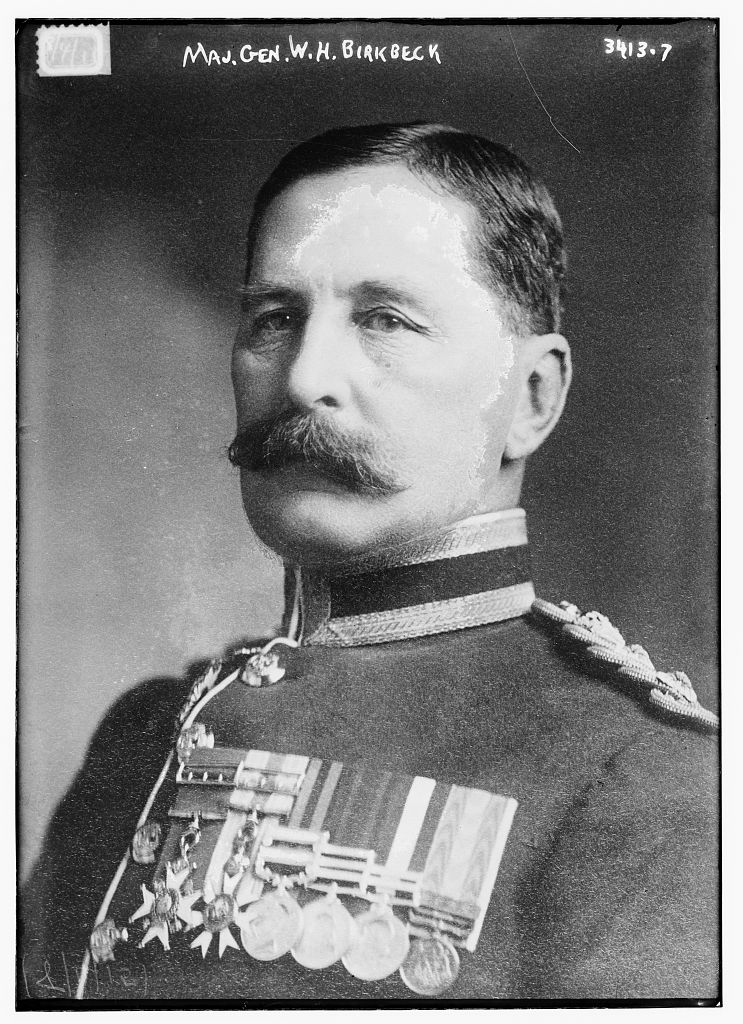
- Birkbeck in 1916
- Born: William Henry Birkbeck; 8 April 1863; Settle, West Riding of Yorkshire, England
- Died: 16 April 1929 (aged 66); Saint-Briac-sur-Mer, France
- Military career
- Allegiance: United Kingdom
- Branch: British Army
- Service years: 1883–1929
- Rank: Major-General
- Conflicts: Second Boer War; First World War

Major-General Sir William Henry Birkbeck, KCB, CMG (8 April 1863 – 16 April 1929) was a British Army officer and administrator. He served in the Second Boer War and First World War, and was the director of remounts at British Army Headquarters from 1912 to 1920.

== Early life and education ==
Birkbeck was born on 8 April 1863 in Settle, West Riding of Yorkshire, England to banker Joseph Birkbeck and Mary Elizabeth (née Mackesy). He was educated at Summer Fields School and Wellington College, where he was on the cricket team. He then entered the Royal Military College, Sandhurst.

== Military career ==
In August 1883, Birkbeck was commissioned as a lieutenant in the 1st King's Dragoon Guards, then sent to India. He served in the Hazara Expedition of 1888 and Chin Lushai Expedition of 1889–90 as a signalling officer. He was mentioned in dispatches and received the campaign medal and two clasps, and was promoted to captain on 31 January 1890.

He became aide-de-camp to Major-General Henry Clement Wilkinson, commanding the North-Eastern District at York, in September 1891 while he prepared for entrance to the Staff College, Camberley. He was in the famous 1896–97 class at Staff College that included Douglas Haig, 1st Earl Haig and Edmund Allenby, 1st Viscount Allenby, and many other officers who distinguished themselves in the Second Boer War and First World War, and was promoted to major on augmentation on 3 April 1897.

Birkbeck served throughout the Second Boer War in South Africa as assistant Inspector of Remounts and received the brevet promotion to lieutenant-colonel on 29 November 1900 and to the local rank of colonel on 16 December 1901, while serving as assistant director of remounts. He impressed his superiors, the commander-in-chief in South Africa, Lord Kitchener, referred to him in a despatch as "perturbed by nothing" and with "considerable ability". For his service in the war he was created a Companion of the Order of the Bath (CB) in the October 1902 South Africa Honours list.

Following the war, he served with the War Office for two year as a staff officer with military education and training under the future Field Marshal Sir Henry Wilson, who became one of his closest friends. While there he became a brevet lieutenant colonel in September 1904. In 1905, he was posted for a year with the Imperial Japanese Army in Manchuria, "where his immense size and genial nature made an excellent impression on our Allies, and led them to help him with much valuable information for his reports."

After returning home, he was placed on half-pay in February 1906 and was made a CMG. On 27 January 1907 he was promoted to colonel and became commandant of the Cavalry School, at Netheravon, taking over this post from Colonel John E. Lindley.

He relinquished the school in January 1911, after having been commandant for over four years, and was placed on half-pay. In September 1912 he reverted to normal pay and served as director of remounts at the War Office, for which he was promoted to the temporary rank of brigadier general while holding this appointment. He was promoted to major general on 25 September 1913.

He was to hold this post until throughout World War I and until February 1920 when he retired from the army. In June 1915 he was made a KCB.

== Personal life ==
In 1905, he married American Mabel (née Shaw), of New Brighton, Staten Island. They had three sons (including Major-General Theodore Birkbeck).

In 1915, he suffered a fall from his horse and was injured, and never fully recovered. He died after a fall while hiking at St. Briac, near Dinard in France in 1929.

== Honours ==
- 1902 – Companion of the Order of the Bath
- 1906 – Companion of the Order of St Michael and St George
- 1915 – Knight Commander of the Order of the Bath
- 1917 – Commander of the Order of the Crown
- 1917 – Commander of the Legion of Honour
