= Peter Glover (British Army officer) =

British Army general

Major-General Peter Glover CB OBE
- Born: 1913
- Died: 2009 (aged 95–96)
- Military career
- Allegiance: United Kingdom
- Branch: British Army
- Rank: Major-General
- Commands: Royal School of Artillery; 49th (North Midlands and West Riding) Division
- Conflicts: Second World War
- Awards: Companion of the Order of the Bath; Officer of the Order of the British Empire

Major-General Peter James Glover, CB, OBE (1913–2009) was a British Army officer.

== Military career ==
Educated at Emmanuel College, Cambridge, Glover was commissioned into the Royal Artillery on 22 June 1934. After serving in the Second World War, he became Commander, Royal Artillery for 1st Infantry Division in February 1959, Commandant of the Royal School of Artillery in June 1960 and General Officer Commanding 49th (North Midlands and West Riding) Division and North Midland District of the Territorial Army in September 1962. He went on to be Defence Adviser in India in December 1963 and Director of the Royal Artillery in August 1966 before retiring in March 1969.

Military offices
Preceded by Theodore Birkbeck	GOC 49th (North Midlands and West Riding) Division; 1962–1963	Succeeded by Christopher Man
