= Commander, Royal Artillery =

Commander, Royal Artillery (CRA) was a military appointment in Commonwealth infantry and armoured divisions in the 20th century. The CRA was the senior artillery officer in the division and commanded the regiments of field, anti-aircraft and anti-tank artillery, and provided specialist artillery and offensive support advice to the divisional commander. Even though the Canadians, New Zealanders, etc. had their own artillery corps (i.e. the Royal Regiment of Canadian Artillery), the term CRA was still used to mark this appointment in formations of those armies (rather than CRCA or CRNZA etc.) for consistency between the allies. The CRA was usually ranked as a brigadier-general in the First World War, and as a brigadier in the Second World War, and if he held this rank was usually referred to as the Brigadier-General, Royal Artillery (BGRA), or Brigadier, Royal Artillery (BRA).

At Corps HQ level there was a Commander, Corps Royal Artillery (CCRA), also a brigadier, who fulfilled the same role within that HQ.
