= 5th Battalion, King's Own Yorkshire Light Infantry =

5th Bn, King's Own Yorkshire Light Infantry 53rd (KOYLI) LAA Regiment, RA 57th (KOYLI) LAA Regiment, RA
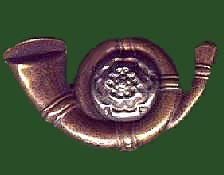
- KOYLI cap badge, featuring a light infantry horn and White Rose of York
- Active: 1 April 1908 – 10 March 1955
- Country: United Kingdom
- Branch: Territorial Army
- Role: Infantry; Air defence
- Size: 1-3 Infantry battalions 2 Artillery regiments
- Part of: 148th (3rd West Riding) Brigade; 187th (2/3rd West Riding) Brigade; Eighth Army; 4th Indian Division; Anti-Aircraft Command
- Garrison/HQ: Doncaster
- Engagements: World War I: Battle of the Somme; Battle of Poelcapelle; Battle of Cambrai; Defence of Bucquoy; Battle of Tardenois; Hundred Days Offensive; World War II: Battle of France; Dunkirk Evacuation; Anglo-Iraqi War; Syria–Lebanon Campaign; Operation Crusader; Battle of Alamein; Tunisian Campaign; Operation Husky; Italian Campaign; Operation Manna

Commanders
- Notable commanders: Lt-Col Oliver Watson, VC, DSO; Maj-Gen William Revell-Smith; Brig Percy Calvert-Jones

The 5th Battalion, King's Own Yorkshire Light Infantry (5th Bn KOYLI), was a unit of Britain's Territorial Force formed in 1908 from Volunteer units originally raised in the West Riding of Yorkshire in 1860. It served in some of the bitterest fighting on the Western Front during World War I, leading the attack at the tank battle of Cambrai and defending Bucquoy in March 1918. In the late 1930s, the battalion was converted to air defence in which role it served during World War II in the Battle of France and the Dunkirk evacuation, in North Africa including the Second Battle of El Alamein, and in the Allied invasions of Sicily and Italy, including service in the rebellion in Greece. Postwar, its successor units served in Anti-Aircraft Command until 1955.

== Origin ==
The battalion was formed in 1908 when the Volunteer Force was subsumed into the new Territorial Force (TF) under the Haldane Reforms. The existing 2nd Volunteer Battalion, York and Lancaster Regiment was split up: the companies from Rotherham and Barnsley became 5th Battalion, York and Lancaster Regiment, while the companies from Doncaster and Pontefract combined with two companies from the 1st Volunteer Battalion, King's Own Yorkshire Light Infantry (KOYLI) to form the 5th Battalion, King's Own Yorkshire Light Infantry.

By 1914, the new battalion was organised as follows:

- HQ, B, C and F Companies at Nether Hall, Frenchgate, Doncaster, (raised on 5 February 1860 as the 20th (Doncaster, Great Northern Railway) and 21st (Doncaster Burgesses) Yorkshire West Riding Rifle Volunteer Corps)
- A Company at Drill Hall, Beechnut Lane, Tanshelf, Pontefract (raised on 2 March 1860 as the 18th Yorkshire West Riding RVC)
- D Company at Pasture Road, Goole (raised on 2 May 1860 as the 28th Yorkshire West Riding RVC)
- E Company at Featherstone
- G Company at Conisbrough
- H Company at Maltkiln Lane, Castleford

Together, the TF battalions of the KOYLI and the York and Lancasters constituted the 3rd West Riding Brigade in the West Riding Division.

== World War I ==
=== Mobilisation ===
Towards the end of July 1914, the units of the West Riding Division left their headquarters for their annual training camps, but on 3 and 4 August they were ordered to return; on 4 August immediate mobilisation was ordered. The 5th KOYLI mobilised at Frenchgate, Doncaster, under Lieutenant-Colonel C. C. Moxon, TD, who had been commanding officer (CO) since 8 October 1912.

Shortly afterwards, TF units were invited to volunteer for Overseas Service and the majority of the battalion did so. On 15 August 1914, the War Office issued instructions to separate those men who had signed up for Home Service only, and form these into reserve units. On 31 August, the formation of a reserve or 2nd Line unit was authorised for each 1st Line unit where 60 per cent or more of the men had volunteered for Overseas Service. The titles of these 2nd Line units would be the same as the original, but distinguished by a '2/' prefix while the parent unit took '1/'. In this way duplicate battalions, brigades and divisions were created, mirroring those TF formations being sent overseas. Later they were mobilised for overseas service in their own right, and 3rd Line or Reserve units were formed.

=== 1/5th Battalion ===
After mobilisation, the 1st West Riding Division concentrated in the South Yorkshire area and began training for war. In November the KOYLI battalions were at Gainsborough, Lincolnshire, then in February 1915 at York. On 31 March the division was informed that it had been selected to proceed to France to join the British Expeditionary Force (BEF), and the battalion landed at Boulogne on 12 April. On 18–19 April platoons from the 3rd West Riding Bde were attached to 8th Division for training in the routine of trench duties. On 28 April the West Riding Division took over its own section of the line at Fleurbaix. It now formed part of IV Corps, which attacked at the Battle of Aubers Ridge on 9 May. While the other two divisions of IV Corps made the actual attack, the West Riding Division took over the greater part of the corps' trench line. It was supposed to follow up and occupy the captured enemy line, but the breakthrough did not occur.

On 12 May, the division was designated 49th (West Riding) Division and the brigade became 148th (3rd West Riding).

For the next nine months, the 49th Division took part in no major operations but was almost continuously engaged in day-to-day trench warfare, much of it in the Ypres Salient, with the considerable casualties that this entailed. On 19 December, the division received a sudden attack with the new German phosgene gas, followed by heavy shelling, but no serious infantry attack followed. In January 1916, the division was withdrawn for its first period of complete rest since it first entered the line.

==== Somme ====
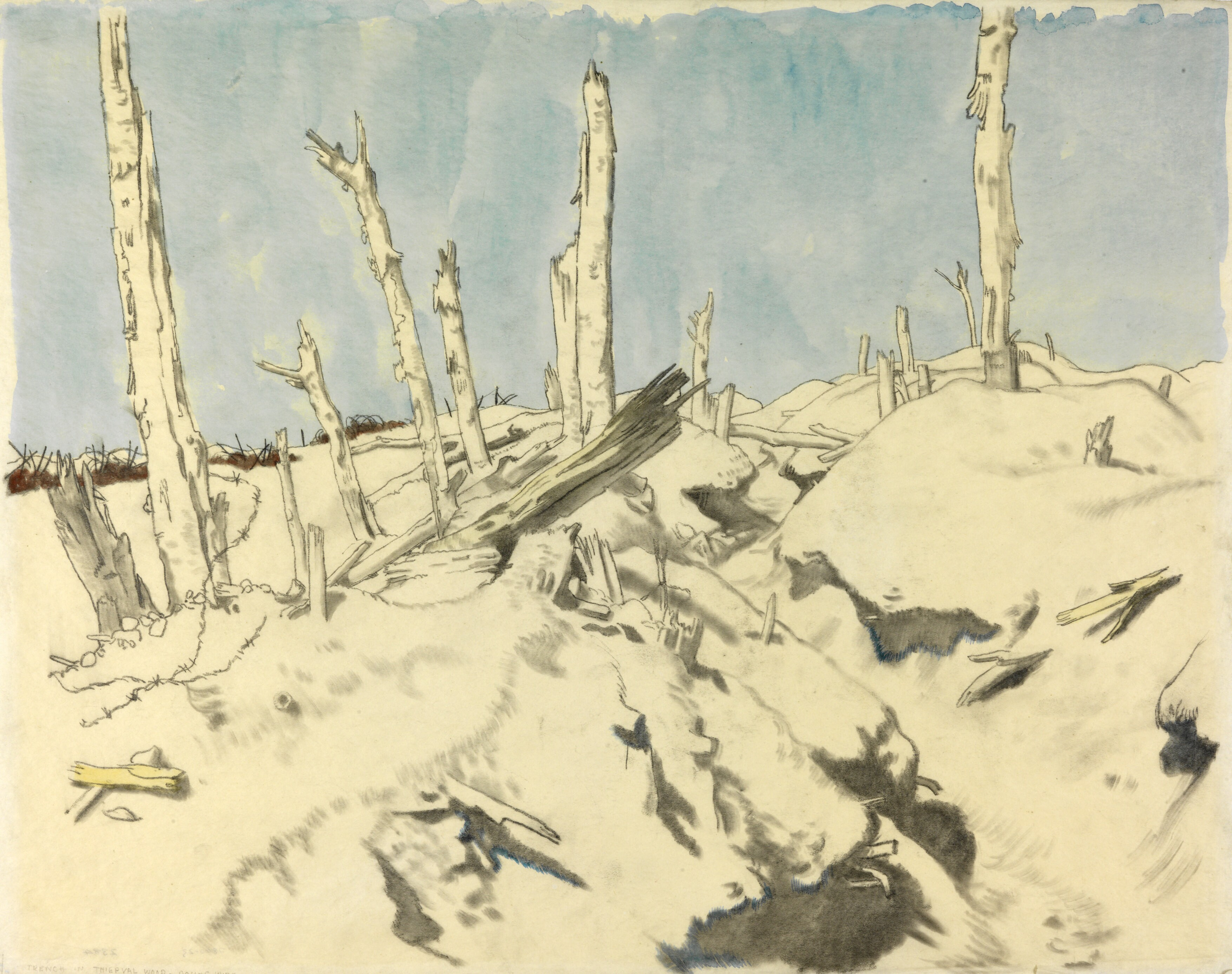
William Orpen, A Trench, Thiepval – German wire.

In February, the division moved to the Somme sector. Here, it spent the next few months alternating trench duties with working parties and training for the forthcoming Somme Offensive. For this, the 49th Division formed the reserve for X Corps, which was tasked with seizing the Thiepval Spur, after which the 49th was to pass through and continue the pursuit. 148 Brigade moved up to assembly trenches in Aveluy Wood before dawn on the day of the attack (1 July). The attack was a disaster along most of the line, but the 36th (Ulster) Division initially made good progress. By the end of the day, it was cut off in the German lines, with its flank open to attack from Thiepval. 148 Brigade was ordered to make a second attack on Thiepval at midnight with 1/4th and 1/5th KOYLI. However, at 23.30 it became clear that the survivors of the Ulsters had retired to their original front trenches and the attack was called off.

By 14 July, the British had taken the Leipzig Redoubt on the Thiepval Spur, and while the offensive continued 49th Division remained holding this area, with a number of small actions and suffering a good deal of shelling, at the same time preparing trenches and dumps for a renewed attack. This was made on 3 September at the end of the Battle of Pozières, but 1/5th KOYLI was not directly involved in the failed action. 49th Division continued minor operations towards Thiepval during the Battle of Flers-Courcelette (15–22 September) before the offensive petered out.

==== Ypres ====
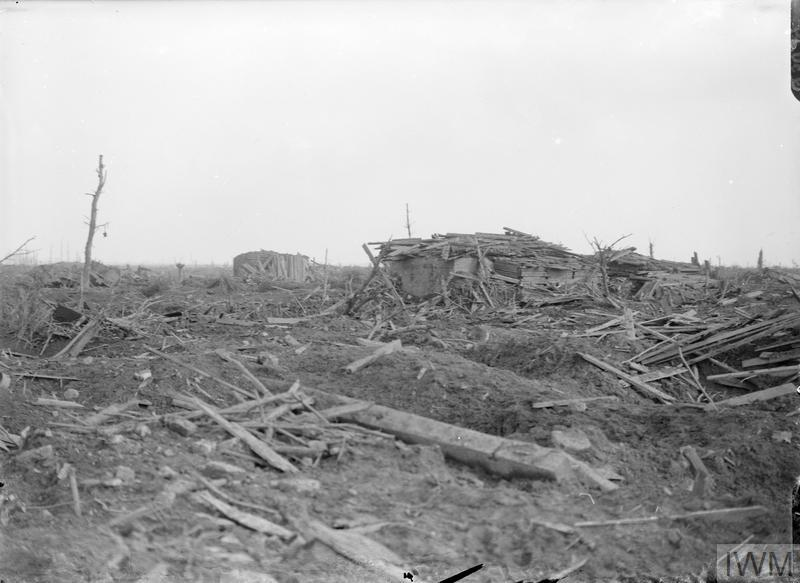
The ruins of Poelcapelle before the battle.

During the summer of 1917, the 49th Division was earmarked for operations along the Flanders coast that failed to materialise. In October it was moved to the Ypres sector to join the Third Ypres Offensive. It took part in the Battle of Poelcapelle on 9 October, with 148 Bde on the left and 146 (1st West Yorkshire) Bde in the centre of the attack. The troops had a long night approach march in rain across appalling ground under shellfire, and only just reached the jumping-off tapes in time for Zero. When the attack went in at 05.20, the rain stopped so that the German defenders had perfect visibility. 148 Brigade was immediately stopped by a flooded stream, leaving 146 Bde to advance alone. They managed a few hundred yards before being stopped by a broad belt of undamaged German barbed wire. The division was now pinned down under fire from artillery, riflemen hidden in shell craters, and from machine guns in German pillboxes on the higher ground ahead. Although some of these pillboxes were taken, the division's attacking troops were back at their start line by the afternoon, having suffered heavy casualties.

By the beginning of 1918, the BEF was suffering a manpower crisis and the decision was made to break up one battalion in each infantry brigade. 1/5th KOYLI was the battalion chosen in 148 Bde: some of the men were drafted to the 1/4th Bn, the remainder joined 2/5th Bn in 62nd (2nd West Riding) Division (see below) which thereafter became simply 5th KOYLI.

=== 2/5th Battalion ===
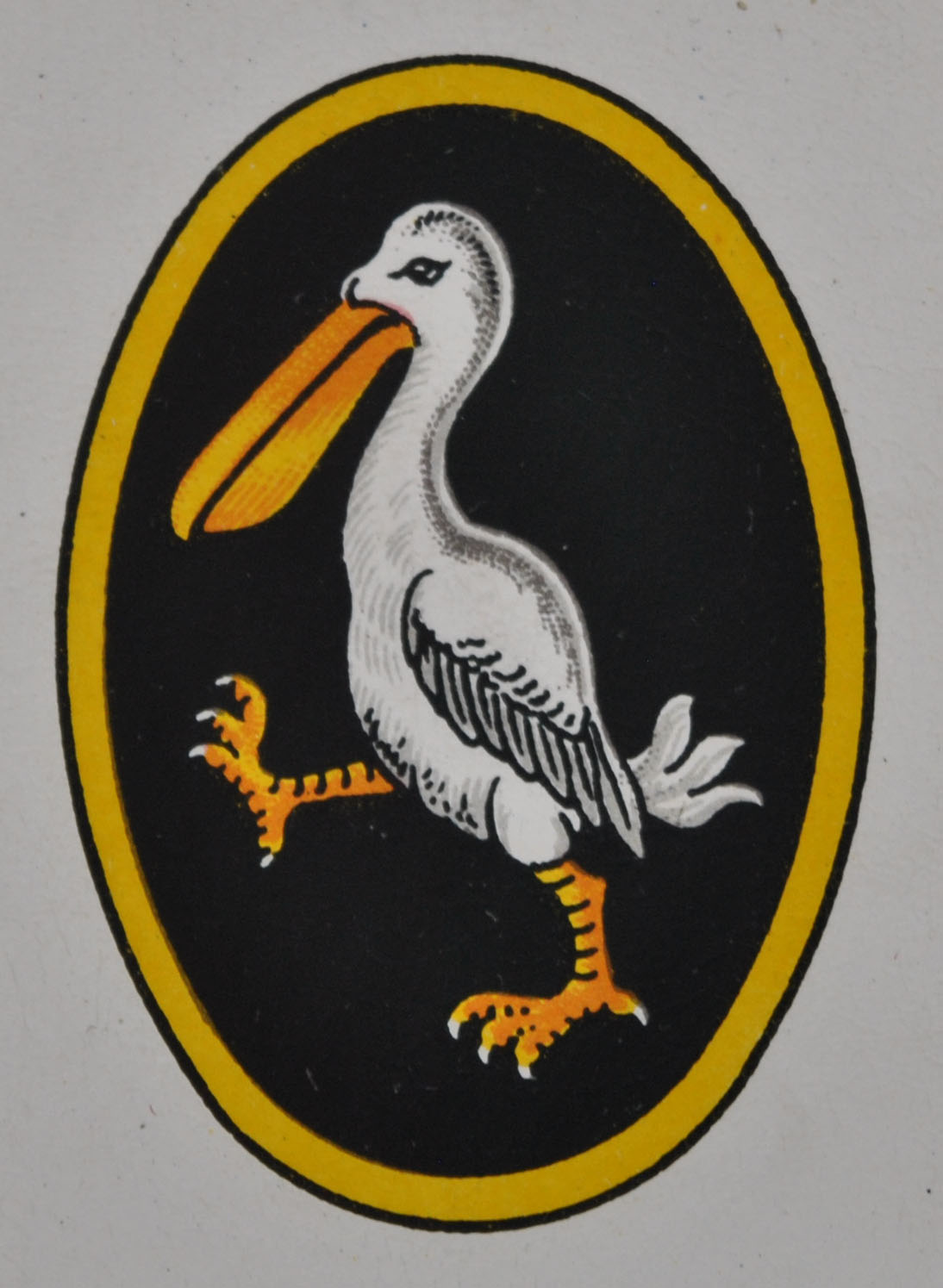
62nd (2nd West Riding) Division's pelican sign (called a duck by the troops): 'when t'duck puts foot down, t'war'll be ower'.

The 2/5th Bn KOYLI was formed at Doncaster on 10 September 1914 and became part of the 2/3rd West Riding Bde in the 2nd West Riding Division. These were later numbered 187 Bde and 62nd Division respectively.

Until April 1915, they had no weapons with to train. Some Lee-Enfield rifles were then received, but these were withdrawn in May, and until the beginning of 1916 the 2nd Line Territorials had to make do with .256-in Japanese Ariska rifles, keeping their ammunition in their pockets until 1914 pattern webbing equipment arrived. With these antiquated weapons the 62nd Division was under orders to move at short notice to defend the East Coast, for which railway trains were kept in readiness. Training was also disrupted by the frequent calls to supply reinforcement drafts to the 1st line serving on the Western Front. In May 1915, the Home Service men of 187 Bde were withdrawn to form 26th Provisional Battalion serving in coast defence in North East England. In October, the division's 2nd Line battalions were reduced to 600 all ranks, the unfit men being posted to the 26th Provisional Bn and the surplus to the 3rd Line, which became the draft-finding unit.

In May 1915, the division moved into camp in 'The Dukeries' area of Nottinghamshire, where it trained until October, when it concentrated round Retford. It then went into the Tyne defences where it dug an entrenched defence line in December. It moved to Larkhill Camp on Salisbury Plain for battle training in January 1916 and finally received SMLE Mk III rifles and Lewis guns, but in June it was sent to the East Coast defences once more, where it was scattered round East Anglia. Here battle training was less convenient and it was again called upon to provide drafts to the Western Front. In October, it moved inland to Bedfordshire and Northamptonshire.

Finally, in October 1916, orders were received to bring the division up to full establishment and prepare for overseas service. Embarkation began at Southampton on 5 January 1917, and the division completed its concentration in France on 18 January. It took its place in the line in the Somme sector opposite Serre. Shortly afterwards, the German army began a planned retreat to the Hindenburg Line (Operation Alberich) and from 15 February to 19 March the division's units were engaged in patrol work and stiff actions against rearguards while advancing across the devastated (and booby-trapped) ground until that line was reached. The division was then shifted to the line opposite Bullecourt in the southern part of the Arras sector.

==== Bullecourt ====
Part of 62nd Division was involved in the failed first attack at Bullecourt on 11 April and in repulsing the German counter-attack at Lagnicourt on 15 April, but 187 Bde was not engaged in major action until the main Battle of Bullecourt opened on 3 May. The division spent the preceding 17 days in rehearsals and the whole division attacked in waves behind tanks and a heavy barrage, with 187 Brigade on the left. The first wave (the two battalions of York & Lancasters) advanced at 03.37 (eight minutes before Zero) to cross 900 yards (820 m) of No man's land, with 2/5th KOYLI under Lt-Col W. Watson and two companies of 2/4th KOYLI in support. They reached the first German line but had lost cohesion before they reached the second. Brigade HQ ordered a second attack in two waves, but this 'ended miserably in shell-holes' and at about 16.00 the division withdrew to a railway embankment where it was relieved. It was not until 17 May that the division finally cleared the village, and operations against the Hindenburg Line continued until 28 May.

After rest and reorganisation, 62nd Division returned to the line in June and began a period of several months of trench-holding.

==== Cambrai ====
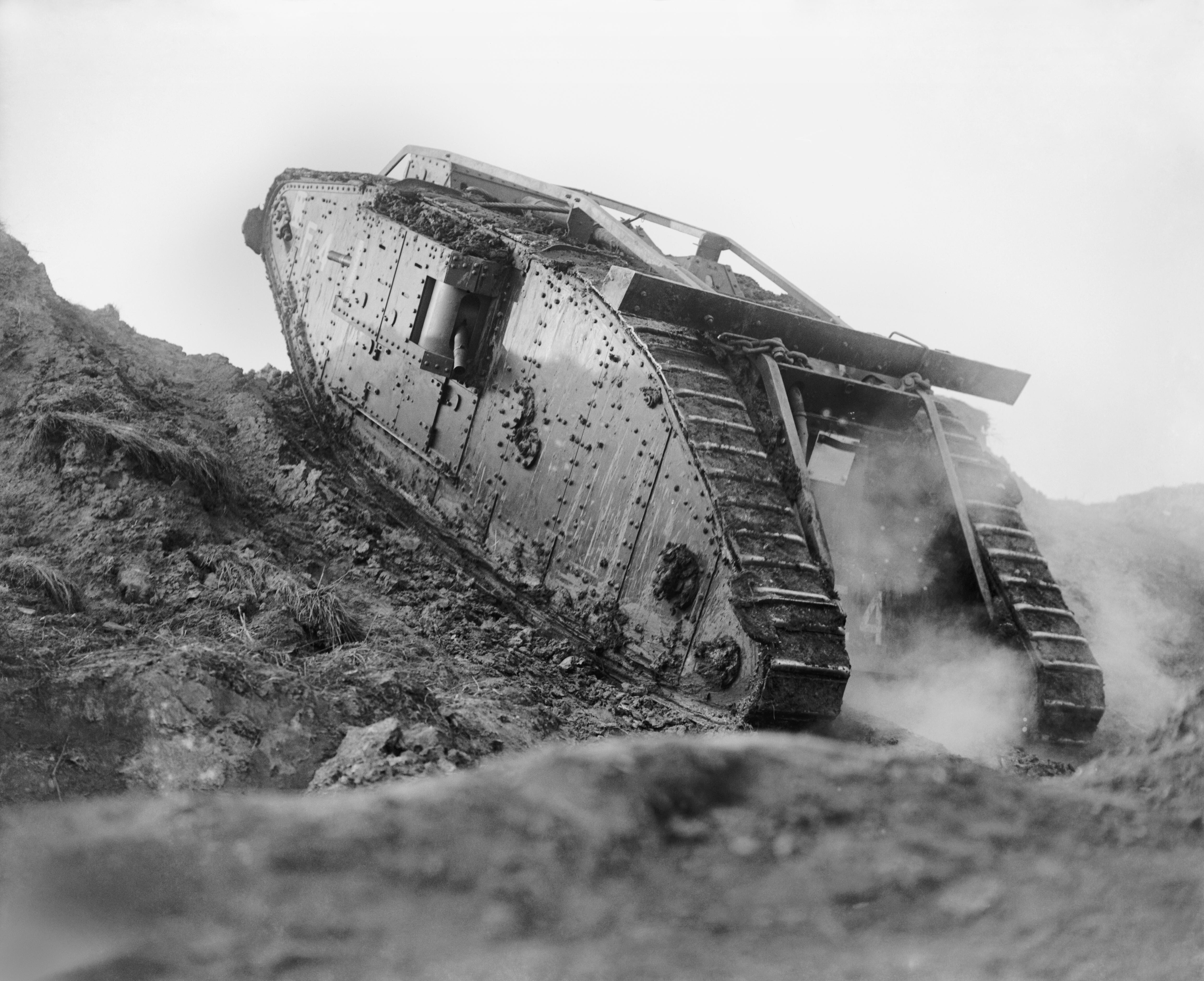
Mark IV Tank (female) training at Wailly 21 October 1917 for the Battle of Cambrai.

62nd Division moved into hutments at Beaulencourt in October 1917, where it trained for open warfare in preparation for the forthcoming Battle of Cambrai, including training with the Tank Corps at Wailly. In its attack on Havrincourt, 187 Bde was to be supported by G Battalion Tank Corps. 2/5th KOYLI was to be preceded by 12 Mark IV tanks (8 fighting tanks and 4 wire-cutters). It was intended that these would help deal with the outpost line then advance in single file up a road to the left of 'Yorkshire Bank'. Two tanks would then go on up the road to help a bombing squad deal with a strongpoint known as 'Etna', while the rest turned left and advanced in line abreast to lead the infantry onto the objective. On the night of 17/18 November 187 Bde took up its positions in Havrincourt Wood.

The surprise attack was launched at dawn on 20 November, with no preceding bombardment; the artillery crashed down on its targets at zero hour. As planned, 2/5th Bn advanced at zero to deal with the outposts, but six of its tanks failed to start (four broken down, one 'bellied' on a tree stump, and one 'ditched') The Etna strongpoint was dealt with by one platoon of 2/5th and two from 2/4th KOYLI on their right. When the battalion delivered its main assault 15 minutes later, it was followed by the six remaining tanks (one reserve tank had arrived, but one had been knocked out on the start line), which had been unable to get forward quickly enough to take the lead. (The delay had been anticipated, so Captain Lynn and 2/Lt James of the 2/5th Bn had marked the gaps in the German wire the night before, rather than wait for the tanks.) The battalion was involved in sharp hand-to-hand fighting in the Hindenburg front trenches and then continued, with its left following the Canal du Nord. One tank had been knocked out soon after crossing the Hindenburg front line, leaving five to support the infantry. By 08.30, the battalion was on its first objective (the Blue Line). The second wave of 187 Bde then leapfrogged through to take the Brown Line by 10.00, and at 11.30 the 186th (2/2nd West Riding) Brigade passed through to the next objective at Graincourt with the surviving tanks. Further progress was held up by the failure of 51st (Highland) Division to take Flesquières, leaving 62nd Division's right flank uncovered.

The divisional objective for the second day of the attack (21 November) was Bourlon Wood, for which 187 Bde was in reserve. However, there were fewer tanks available and progress was slower than on the first day. Anneux was taken but Bourlon Wood remained out of reach. A dawn counter-attack by the Germans on 22 November ended any further advances. 62nd Division was relieved by 40th Division in a tricky operation that night.

The division was back in Bourlon Wood on 27 November for another attempt to complete its capture. 187 Brigade led on the left at 06.20 with 16 of the remaining tanks to take Bourlon Village. 2/5th KOYLI and 2/5th York & Lancasters followed 11 tanks of F Battalion, Tank Corps. Four tanks and a KOYLI company were to cover the left flank by dealing with machine gun posts in the Marcoing Line. It was dark and snowing: the infantry had difficulty keeping up with the creeping barrage and when the tanks and infantry entered Bourlon they found the village a network of formidable defences hardly touched by the shellfire. The flanking party lost its direction and failed, so that the rest of the battalion was badly hit by enfilade fire from the left. After two hours' fighting the battalion was driven out of Bourlon. It was relieved at the end of the day. The division had however succeeded in taking the last of Bourlon Ridge, which had been fought over for a week. The exhausted West Riding division was then relieved (under a hail of German gas shells) before the German counter-attack took back all the hard-won ground a few days later.

On 2 February 1918, the battalion absorbed the remnant of 1/5th Bn from 49th Division (see above), becoming simply 5th KOYLI from then on.

==== Bucquoy ====
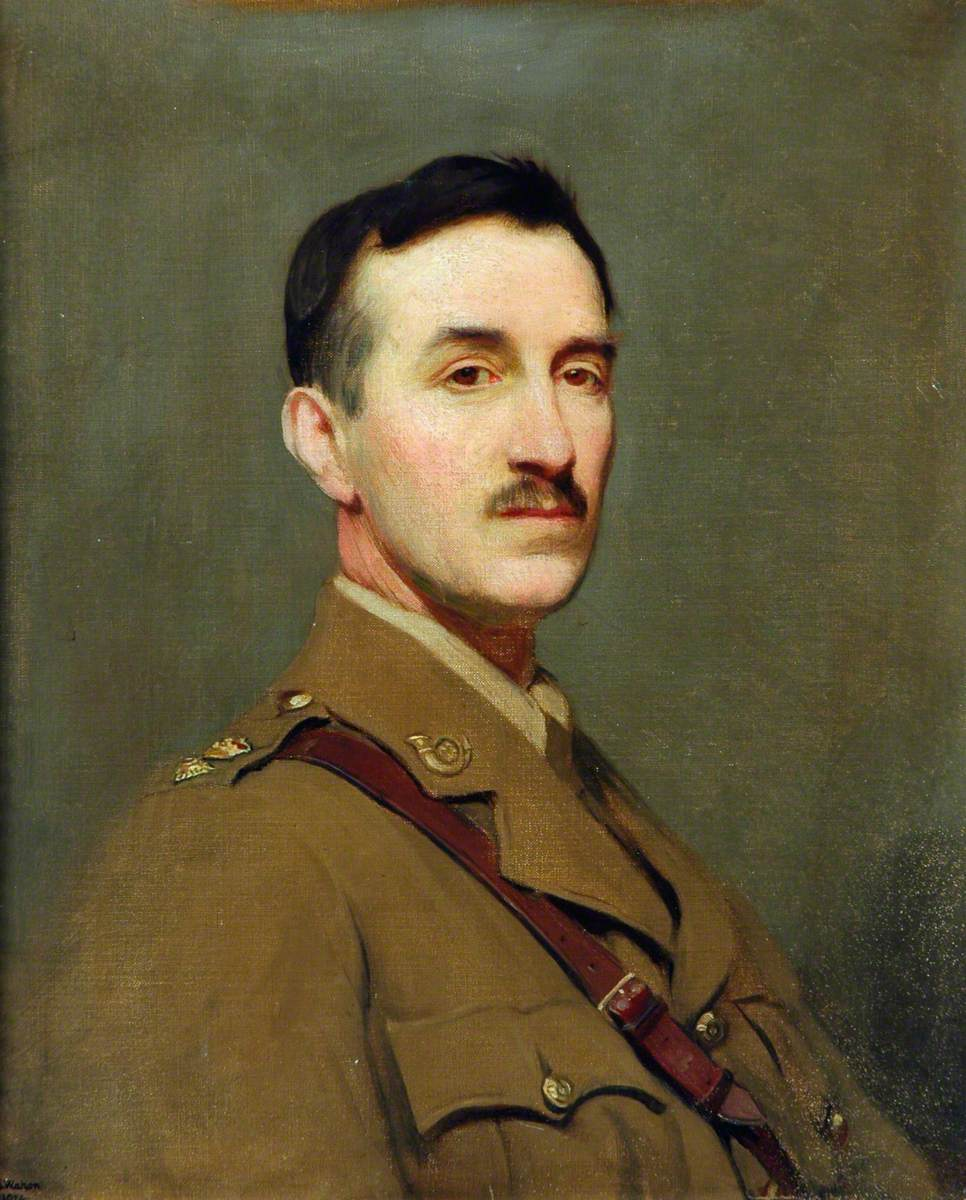
Lt-Col Oliver Watson, VC, DSO, painted by George Spencer Watson.

During the German spring offensive, 62nd Division was brought up from reserve on 26 March and became involved in the Battle of Bapaume when it took up defensive positions around Bucquoy and Rossignol Wood to cover the exits from Puisieux. The Germans resumed their attacks on 27 March, towards the end of which they began to exploit a gap between 62nd Division and the 4th Australian Brigade at Hébuterne to the south. At 19.00, Lt-Col Oliver Watson commanding 5th KOYLI was ordered to counter-attack Rossignol Wood with the assistance of four tanks. The counter-attack temporarily succeeded, but Germans continued to hold out in two improvised strongpoints among old trenches. Watson then led his remaining reserve in a series of bombing attacks under heavy fire. Eventually he had to order his men to retire, and was killed while covering their retreat. Watson was considered to have saved the division, and was awarded a posthumous Victoria Cross. The following day 5th KOYLIs were finally pushed off the Hébuterne–Rossignol Wood ridge by German bombing parties, but the position was restored by the divisional reserve and the Australians, and the German advance was halted in the division's sector. The division was relieved on 28/29 March for rest and reorganisation.

==== Hundred Days Offensive ====
In July, the 62nd Division counter-attacked under French command in the Battle of Tardenois. 187 Brigade led the right of the division at 08.00 on 20 July, attacking through thickly wooded country, and made slow progress, suffering heavy casualties as the men worked round stubborn German machine gun posts. At 10.30 the next day, the brigade attacked again to clear a strongpoint on a timbered spur south-west of the Bois du Petit Champ. Once this was accomplished the rest of the division could take the Bois du Petit Champ on 22 July and push on. The operation continued until 30 July.

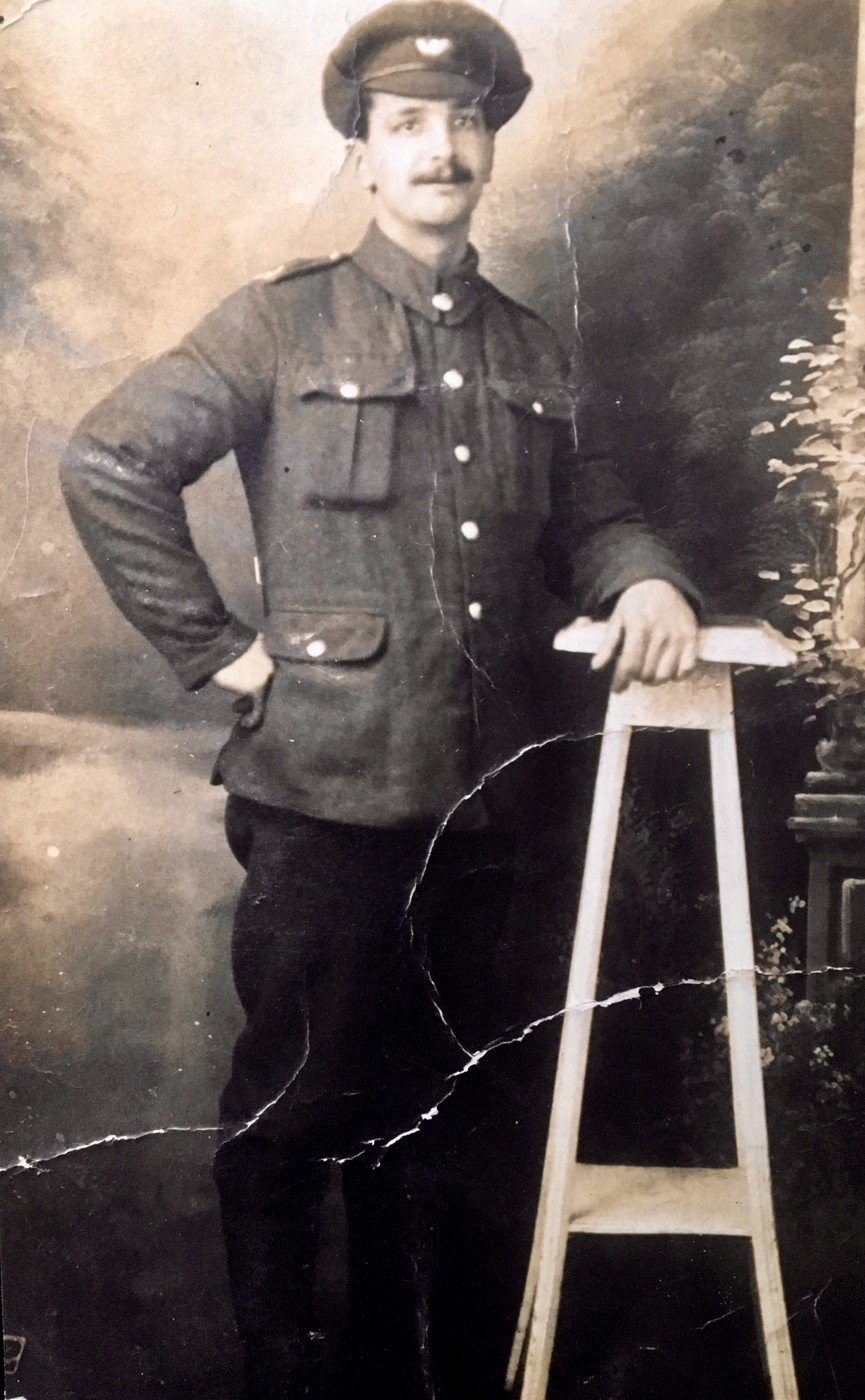
Sgt Laurence Calvert, VC

The division then reverted to British command for the Allied Hundred Days Offensive, beginning with the Second Battle of Bapaume, when it effectively exploited a pre-dawn attack by 2nd Division on 25 August. 5th Battalion KOYLI was prominent in driving the Germans out of Mory, taking many prisoners. The division then attacked again in the afternoon of 29 August behind a creeping barrage. It continued with the Battle of the Drocourt-Quéant Line (2 September) and then advanced to the Hindenburg Line to participate in the Battle of Havrincourt on 12 September. 187 Brigade attacked on the right of the division, supported by heavy artillery, and within an hour of zero was sending back batches of prisoners. Four officers and 80 men had been captured at a strongpoint by Sergeant Laurence Calvert, MM, of 5th KOYLI, who had rushed the enemy machine gun teams single-handed, bayonetting three and shooting four. Calvert was also awarded the VC.

At the Battle of the Canal du Nord on 27 September, the division was tasked with passing through the first wave of attackers. 187 Brigade began moving forward early, but it was delayed helping the units in front to take Ribécourt, and so lost its creeping barrage. The division to the right failed to capture its objective, so 187 Bde could not advance much beyond Ribécourt. However, the following morning the attack was renewed on the right, and 187 Bde joined in at 04.35 as the barrage passed it. The previous day's third objective (Highland Ridge) was secured right up to the Hindenburg Support Line. It then took part in 62nd Division's main attack at 06.30, advancing towards Masnières on the Scheldt Canal, though it was checked by enemy fire once it reached the Marcoing Line. The attack was renewed at 18.30 that evening, and the brigade reached the canal bend and Marcoing Copse. The division continued to push on towards distant objectives on 30 September.

On 19–20 October, during the Battle of the Selle, 62nd Division had the task of taking Solesmes and clearing the bank of the River Selle. There was street fighting in Solesmes, but the troops waded across the Selle.

At the opening of the Battle of the Sambre on 4 November, 187 Bde's start was hampered by German counter-bombardment and mist. Resistance was slight at first, but stiffened as the advance continued. However, the division pushed on again in the afternoon, taking hundreds of prisoners, and continued the advance the following day. When the enemy seemed prepared to resist on a line from the Forêt de Mormal to Bermeries, the action of the 5th KOYLI advancing alongside 1st and 2nd Grenadier Guards and five Whippet tanks soon 'disposed of his desire for resistance'.

62nd Division remained in the front line, pushing its way toward the fortress of Maubeuge. 187 Brigade attacked at 06.30 on 8 November, making rapid progress and capturing Neuf-Mesnil by 08.00. However, at 08.45 it came under heavy fire from Fort Gravaux and a group of slag heaps. The brigadier decided to turn the position with his reserve battalion, 5th KOYLI, which attacked at 14.30 behind a barrage, clearing defended houses and securing the road and railway. Two attacks were made on Fort Gravaux during the night, and it was captured at the third attempt the following morning. 187 Brigade then cleared the southern suburbs of Maubeuge. Over the following two days, the division advanced slowly, with cavalry and cyclist patrols in front trying to find the retreating enemy. At 11.00 on 11 November hostilities ceased when the Armistice with Germany came into effect.

The division was selected to move into Germany and occupy bridgeheads on the Rhine, taking up its positions on 25 December. It was the only TF division to cross the frontier into Germany. From 21 February 1919. the infantry battalions were progressively relieved by other units and returned to England for demobilisation. 5th Battalion KOYLI was formally disembodied on 16 October 1919.

=== 3/5th Battalion ===
The 3/5th Bn was formed at Doncaster in March 1915 and then moved to Clipstone Camp in Nottinghamshire where its role was to train drafts for the 1st and 2nd Line battalions. On 8 April it was renamed the 5th Reserve Bn KOYLI and on 1 September it was absorbed by the 4th Reserve Bn.

=== 27th Provisional Battalion ===
In 1915, the Home Service men of the 5th KOYLIs, together with those of several other West Riding TF battalions, were combined into the 27th Provisional Battalion at York, which served in home defence with 2nd Provisional Brigade. It appears to have been disbanded before the Military Service Act 1916 swept away the Home/Foreign service distinction, and all TF soldiers became liable for overseas service, if medically fit.

== Interwar ==
The TF reformed on 7 February 1920 (reorganising as the Territorial Army the following year), with 5th Bn KOYLI once again in 148th (3rd West Riding) Bde of 49th (West Riding) Division.

=== Anti-Aircraft conversion ===
During the 1930s, the increasing need for anti-aircraft (AA) defence for Britain's cities was addressed by converting a number of TA infantry battalions into AA units of the Royal Artillery (RA). In 1938, the battalion became 53rd (5th Bn King's Own Yorkshire Light Infantry) Light Anti-Aircraft Regiment, Royal Artillery, consisting of HQ, 157th, 158th and 159th Light Anti-Aircraft (LAA) Batteries at Scarborough Barracks, Doncaster. The TA's AA units were mobilised on 23 September 1938 during the Munich Crisis, with units manning their emergency positions within 24 hours, even though many did not yet have their full complement of men or equipment. The emergency lasted three weeks, and they were stood down on 13 October. After Munich, the TA was rapidly doubled in size, many units forming duplicates in 1939 as they had in 1914. The 53rd formed 57th LAA Regiment, RA at Doncaster (it had KOYLI added to its official title on 17 February 1942) with 169, 170 and 171 LAA Btys. Both regiments were in Northern Command of Home Forces.

== World War II ==
=== 53rd LAA Regiment ===
The regiment was ordered to mobilise on 31 August 1939. It reported the progress of mobilisation and received instructions both through 49th (WR) Division in Northern Command and 50th Light Anti-Aircraft Brigade of 2nd Anti-Aircraft Division in Anti-Aircraft Command (which had fully mobilised on 24 August). By 18.00 on 3 September – the day war was declared – it had a mobilised strength of 17 officers and 542 other ranks, only 1 officer and 16 other ranks short of its war establishment.

For the first few days after mobilisation, 157 and 158 Btys were billeted at the Central Schools in Danum Road, Doncaster, while Lewis and Bren light machine guns (LMGs) were set up for AA protection and the men dug air raid trenches in Elmfield Park. On 9 September, the regiment's first convoy of vehicles and Bofors 40 mm guns set off for a camp at Thursley near Aldershot. The regiment completed equipping and training at Thursley and at Bordon Camp, in preparation for joining the British Expeditionary Force (BEF) in France. It sent its vehicles to Southampton Docks for transport to Cherbourg, and the main body went by train to Southampton on 29 September.

==== Battle of France ====
The regiment spent the Phoney War period training and equipping in France. In October, it took delivery of some Vickers 2-pdr guns to supplement the Bofors and LMGs it already held. By November, it had 22 x Bofors and 28 x LMGs. The only event of note was a football match between the British and French armies in February, for which 157 LAA Bty provided AA cover with its seven available Bofors guns.

When the German invasion of the Low Countries began on 10 May, the BEF advanced into Belgium in accordance with 'Plan D'. 53rd (KOYLI) LAA Rgt, under the command of Lt-Col William Revell-Smith, (Note: William Revell-Smith went on to command 11 AA Bde training units for overseas service, to command a Group in AA Command, and then to be Major-General, AA, for 21st Army Group in the campaign in North West Europe.) was attached to II Corps and assigned to route protection at the river and canal crossings, where all three batteries came into action. Sergeant Parr of C Troop (157 Bty), brought down the regiment's first aircraft at Roubaix on 11 May. The regiment was bombed as it moved into Belgium on 12 May, but further enemy aircraft were brought down. As the Dyle line was occupied, the batteries were distributed among field gun positions and II Corps' HQ at Louvain.

However, the German breakthrough in the Ardennes turned the flank of the Dyle position and the BEF was compelled to retreat on 16 May. The batteries moved back in stages with II Corps, through Brussels to the line of the Escaut, engaging enemy aircraft en route. Reaching the Escaut at Rugge on 19 May, the battery commander of 157 Bty blew the bridge. At Helchin, E Troop (158 Bty) became the rallying point for a Guards battalion that was falling back, while the gunners brought down a Henschel Hs 126 observing for German artillery. At one point the battery came across an intact battery of French AA guns that had been abandoned: they ensured that these were destroyed. Once across the river the regiment deployed behind 3rd Division, handing over all its small arms ammunition to help the infantry.

Between 21 and 23 May, the BEF retired again, from the Escaut to the canals along the Franco-Belgian frontier. By now, the BEF was cut off from the rest of France, a bridgehead was being organised around Dunkirk, and on 26 May the decision was made to evacuate the BEF through that port. II Corps ordered 53rd LAA Rgt's batteries to make their own way to Dunkirk to provide cover as formations gathered there, but they were caught up in the ground battle and took several days to make the journey. On the way, they fought a series of short AA actions but lost a third of their guns, damaged or immobilised on blocked roads. By 29 May, the regiment had 16 Bofors guns at the beaches. The AA commander placed 157 and 159 Btys under 2 AA Bde along the sea front and harbour, while the remains of 158 Bty were on the beach at La Panne. Ammunition was running low, but 157 Bty salvaged boxes that had been dumped in a dyke. All three batteries were in action against low-flying attacks by the Luftwaffe on 30 and 31 May, claiming more victims, but under fire and bombing themselves. HQ details and non-essential men embarked on 30 May, and on 31 May the batteries thinned out their strength to leave just five or six men with each gun. Finally, the remaining guns were disabled during the night of 31 May/1 June and the gun teams withdrew to the evacuation points. In three weeks of virtually continuous action, the regiment claimed to have shot down 28 enemy aircraft.

=== Home Defence ===
The regiment's last details arrived in England at dawn on 1 June, 158 Bty aboard the minesweeper HMS Hebe. AA units returning from France were rapidly reinforced, re-equipped where possible, and redeployed for future integration into existing defence plans. 53rd LAA Regiment went to Wimborne Minster, where it re-equipped with Bofors guns. It still formed a mobile part of Home Forces, and at New Year 1941 it joined the GHQ Reserve with its own signal section of the Royal Corps of Signals. By March, it had gained its own transport section of the Royal Army Service Corps In March 1942, the regiment transferred from the GHQ Reserve to direct War Office Control, preparatory to going overseas. It left the UK during July 1942.

==== Western Desert ====
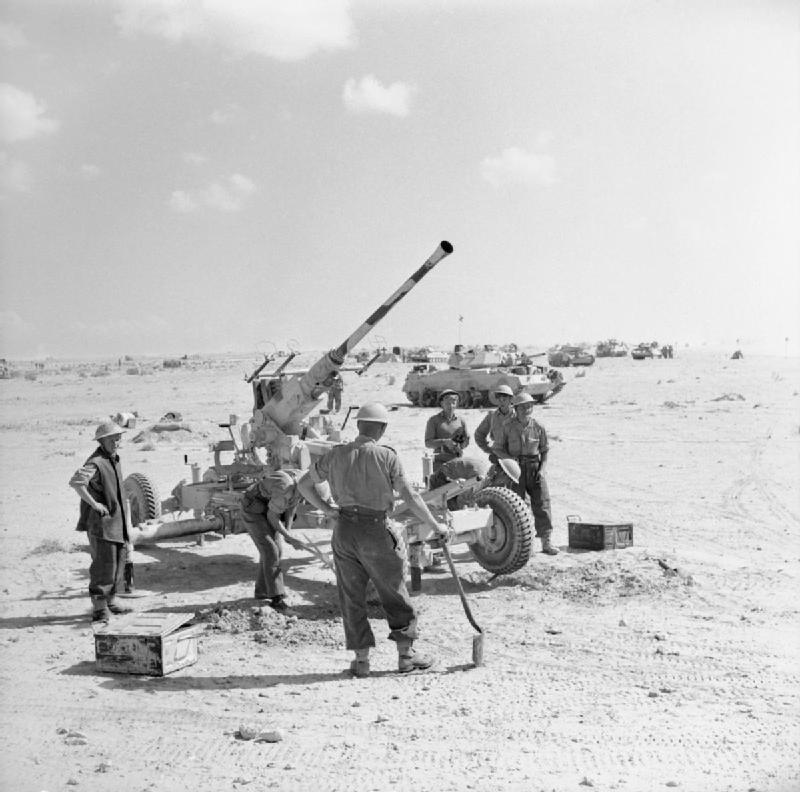
A Bofors gun crew digging in near a squadron of Crusader tanks, 29 October 1942.

53rd LAA Regiment arrived in Egypt during the summer of 1942 as part of the reinforcements for Eighth Army. On 9 September it became the LAA regiment of 10th Armoured Division, which had just fought in the Battle of Alam el Halfa.

Over the next few weeks careful preparations were made for the Second Battle of El Alamein, which opened on the night of 23 October with Operation Lightfoot. 10th Armoured Division's role was to follow the infantry attack, clearing lanes through the enemy minefields, in order to pass through the following day. 53rd LAA Regiment, with 48 Bofors guns, was defending the division's columns as they moved up, apart from one Troop detached to guard X Corps' HQ. While preparing to start their break-out at 22.00 on 24 October, the division was hit by an air attack that left many vehicles blazing, which attracted further attacks. The division's armour had to disperse for protection, and only just reorganised and got through the minefield gaps by daybreak. The fighting continued for several days in what the British commander, Gen Bernard Montgomery, termed 'the dog-fight'. By the time the break-out attack (Operation Supercharge) came on 1 November, 10th Armoured Division was out of the line, with much of its remaining armour lent to other formations.

10th Armoured Division was reconstituted for the pursuit after Alamein, but 53rd LAA Rgt was no longer with it, having left on 2 November. By January 1943 the regiment (with 36 Bofors guns) was in Libya with 2 AA Bde on tasks for XXX Corps. When the North African Campaign ended in May 1943 with the Axis surrender in Tunisia, the regiment was with 12 AA Bde, which had followed Eighth Army's advance for 1,500 miles (2,400 km), supplying mobile AA groups to defend forward landing grounds for the Desert Air Force as they were captured. Bofors guns were frequently employed to 'sweep' with automatic fire when Luftwaffe fighter-bombers attacked out of the sun.

==== Italy ====
53rd LAA Regiment's batteries began arriving in Sicily shortly after the Allied invasion (Operation Husky) began on 10 July 1943. The landing convoys came under attack from sea and air, and 157 LAA Bty lost 15 guns and all its vehicles when its ship was sunk in Syracuse harbour. As the campaign developed, the regiment came under the command of 73 AA Bde, which had detachments protecting airfields around Lentini, Gerbini, Agnone and Scordia, though vehicles were very short and mobility was limited.

Even before the capture of Sicily was complete, Eighth Army reorganised for its next operation (Baytown), the landing by XIII Corps on the 'toe' of Italy beginning on the night of 2/3 September. 53rd LAA Regiment was one of the units assigned to provide AA cover under 2 AA Bde. 158 LAA Battery was allocated to the initial landings on the beaches near Reggio, which came under dive-bombing attack. However, the landings went smoothly and by 5 September the whole regiment was protecting the beaches while the rest of 2 AA Bde moved on to Reggio and the airfields. As XIII Corps worked methodically through Calabria, 2 AA Bde's units followed up to cover the small harbours and airfields as they were captured.

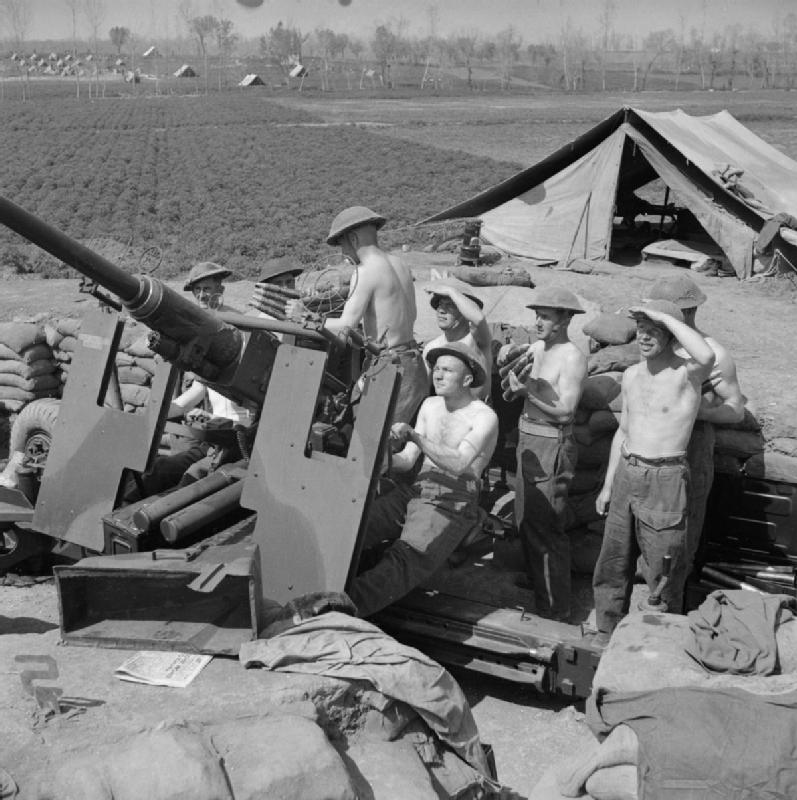
Bofors gun crew on the alert in Italy, 7 April 1944.

Towards the end of September, 2 AA Bde was warned to concentrate its units for a move across Italy to protect the Foggia Airfield Complex, where it arrived on 30 September. For three weeks it was deployed around the main airfield and four satellite landing grounds, then on 27 October it moved forward again to a fresh group of airfields and a railhead in support of 1st Canadian Division, with a troop (6 guns) or battery (18 guns) at each airstrip. The campaign then bogged down and Allied forces were drawn away to the western side of Italy, leaving V Corps, supported by 2 AA Bde, to hold the eastern (Adriatic) front for many months. With little Luftwaffe activity, 2 AA Bde took every opportunity to use its guns in forward areas for non-AA tasks.

When fresh operations began on the Adriatic Front resumed in May 1944, 2 AA Bde moved up behind V Corps, mainly to protect landing-grounds and field gun areas. In July it reached Ancona and deployed its AA units around the city. At the beginning of August, 2 AA Bde HQ and most of its regiments drove across Italy to Anzio, while 53rd LAA Rgt temporarily joined 66 AA Bde. British forces in Italy were suffering a manpower shortage, and 53 LAA Rgt was one of several LAA units that were now retrained as infantry. It moved to Siena and began intensive training. When the enemy made a large scale withdrawal and X Corps was unable to follow up in strength, 2 AA Bde provided a minimum force to hold the line with 11th (City of London Yeomanry) and 53rd (KOYLI) LAA Rgts manning the front line while undergoing further infantry training. The regiment reorganised on the basis of three rifle companies and a support company equipped with 3-inch mortars.

In October, 2 AA Bde was relieved but 53rd LAA Rgt remained in the sector as infantry under the command of 7th Motor Brigade, holding a series of ridges as the most advanced unit of Eighth Army. It brought up some Bofors sections to act as heavy machine guns. At the end of October it reverted to 2 AA Bde and resumed its LAA role in support of XIII Corps and defending landing-grounds at Arezzo. There was little enemy air activity during the winter of 1944–45, and in LAA regiments were reduced from 54 to 36 Bofors guns, with the surplus men being reassigned. 53rd LAA Regiment spent three months operating a defensive smoke screen, firing mortars and Bofors in support of the forward infantry, and carrying stretchers.

In March, after a short rest, the regiment returned to the front around San Clemente and Valsenio, south of Imola, as Allied forces prepared for a new Spring 1945 offensive in Italy. 158 LAA Bty was detached to man 3-inch mortars in support of the Folgore Group of the Italian Co-belligerent Army. When the Corps commander, Lieutenant-General Sir John Harding and other officers visited 158 Bty's forward mortar positions, they were given lunch cooked by a peacetime hotel chef, served by a professional butler, who were among the gunners. This deployment lasted until the final surrender of the German armies in Italy at the end of April. The regiment then concentrated at Forlì and subsequently undertook occupation duties at Venice. The regiment was placed in suspended animation in September 1946.

=== 57th LAA Regiment ===
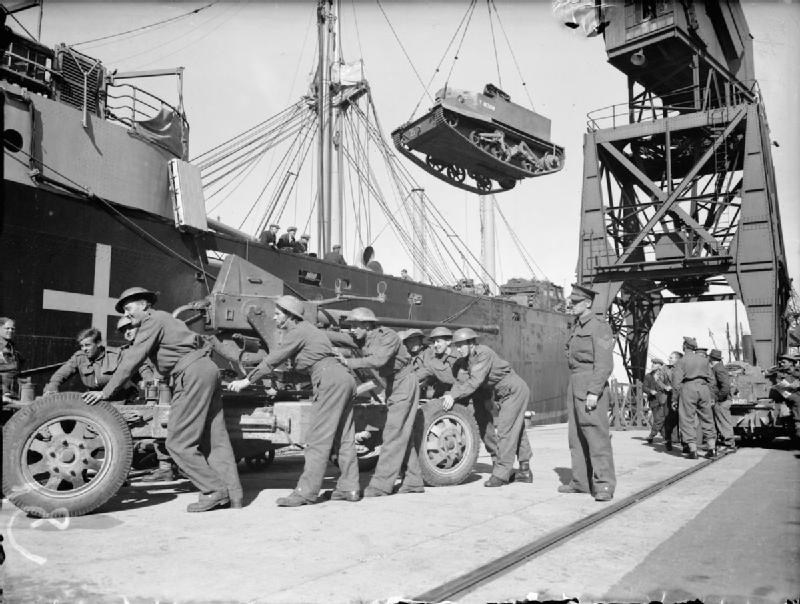
Bofors gun being unloaded at Southampton following the evacuation from Cherbourg, June 1940.

Like its parent unit, 57th LAA Regiment mobilised at Doncaster in Northern Command in September 1939. However, it was less advanced in training and equipment and was not ready for deployment overseas until May 1940.

In May/June 1940, while the Dunkirk evacuation was already under way, the regiment was deployed as follows under the command of Lt-Col Percy Calvert-Jones: (Note: Percy Calvert-Jones went on to a series of AA and field artillery commands before becoming Commander GHQ AA Troops in 21st Army Group and Revell-Smith's deputy.)

- 169 LAA Bty – ordered to the Isles of Scilly, but never went there
- 170 LAA Bty – landed at Cherbourg in June as part of the Second BEF, which was evacuated in Operation Aerial following the French Armistice of 22 June 1940.
- 171 LAA Bty – landed on Jersey and Guernsey but withdrawn after only two days, ahead of the German occupation of the Channel Islands.

57th LAA Regiment reassembled at Blackdown, where it re-equipped with Bofors guns. In January 1941, the regiment joined the War Office Reserve, and left the UK for the Middle East in March.

==== Middle East ====
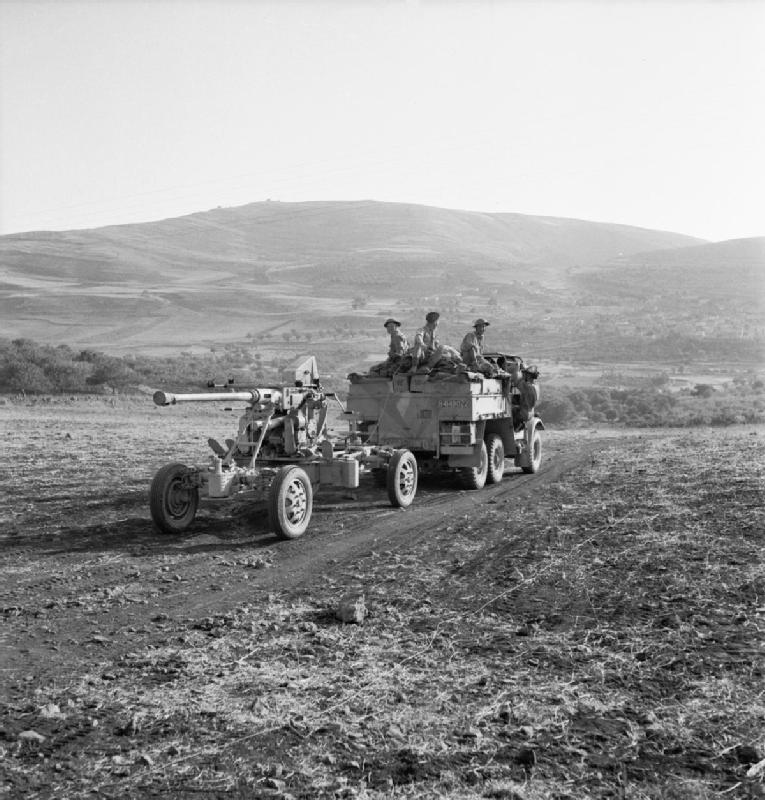
Bofors gun under tow, Syria, 16 June 1941.

On arrival, the regiment was sent to Palestine, in preparation for a campaign in Vichy French-controlled Syria and Lebanon (Operation Exporter). When the Anglo-Iraqi War broke out on 2 May, GHQ Middle East had no AA units to spare until 57th LAA Rgt arrived. 169 LAA Battery was then detached and made a 1,100 miles (1,800 km) journey across the desert, reaching RAF Habbaniya six days later. By then the siege of the airfield had been lifted and the situation in Iraq was in hand; a truce was arranged three days later. 169 LAA Battery then returned to Palestine, where the rest of the regiment was deployed to defend the port of Haifa and Lydda airfield.

Operation Exporter began on 8 June, with Allied forces moving north into Lebanon and Syria. 57th LAA Regiment moved up with the force as Corps Troops, with one battery on each of the three main lines of advance. With difficult terrain to cover and numerous tasks, the batteries were split up into separate troops or even 3-gun sections. The Vichy and German aircraft often remained out of Bofors range, but some LAA positions were involved in actions against Vichy tanks. A truce was agreed on 11 July and by the following month 57th LAA Rgt was back in Palestine.

==== Western Desert ====
4th Indian Division's formation sign.

In October 1941, the regiment moved to the Western Desert where Eighth Army was preparing to launch Operation Crusader. It was attached to 4th Indian Division in XIII Corps, but A and B Troops were deployed with 4th South African Armoured Car Regiment in 7th Armoured Division (XXX Corps), C Trp with 1st Army Tank Brigade (XIII Corps), and D Troop with 1st Field Rgt, RA, of 4th Indian Division. Even within 4th Indian Division, the artillery units became scattered among the infantry brigades as the operation progressed. During the division's advance through Cyrenaica a mixed column protected by a troop of the regiment came under attack by six Junkers Ju 87 Stukas escorted by Italian Fiat CR.42 fighters. The Bofors guns opened up in a 'crash' action while still on their wheels, shooting down three Ju 87s. On another occasion a troop on the move was located by a Messerschmitt Bf 110 leading 14 Ju 87s, eight Messerschmitt Bf 109s and a few CR.42s. The first gun to halt shot down the Bf 110 with five rounds; the troop then took on the remainder and brought down four Ju 87s and one CR.42: a total of six 'kills' for 113 rounds fired.

The regiment's Bofors guns could also knock out light armour. On 3 December, 11 Indian Brigade Group was ordered to capture Point 182 near El Adem. After a long night march the attack was only partially successful, but a troop of 57th LAA Rgt disabled 16 tanks. On 14 December, 7th Indian Brigade Group was probing towards Alem Hamza when it was attacked by 39 German tanks; the Indian infantry was ordered to withdraw to leave the desert clear for the British tanks and artillery, including B Trp of 171 LAA Bty. Although the Panzer force overran a troop of 25th Field Rgt, it lost 14 tanks to the combined fire of field, anti-tank and LAA guns and withdrew. There were also failures when attackers gained successes through surprise or numbers, but by the end of the operation 57th LAA Rgt claimed a total of 103 aircraft and 10 tanks destroyed. From November 1941 to March 1942 it accounted for 130 enemy aircraft destroyed and 301 damaged, and destroyed or damaged 22 tanks.

After the failure of the Crusader offensive, 4th Indian Division was withdrawn from the front, but 57th LAA Rgt was attached to 1st Armoured Division just before the Battle of Gazala in May 1942.

By the time of the Second Battle of El Alamein, the regiment was back with 4th Indian Division, with 48 Bofors guns. As part of the deception plan for the battle, the regiment simulated an attack during Operation Lightfoot by firing tracer ammunition into a smokescreen laid over the German positions.

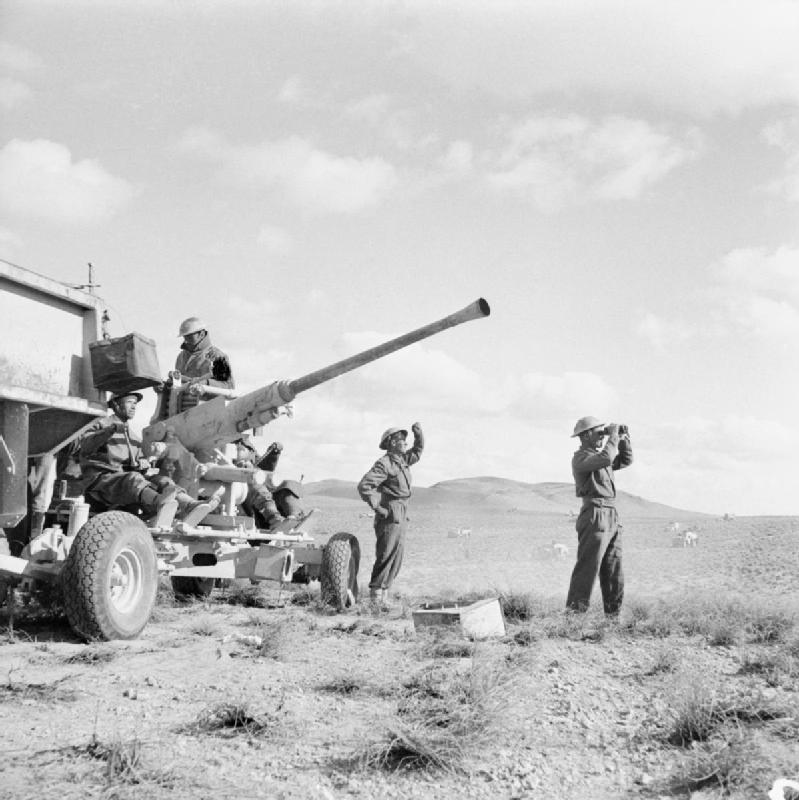
Bofors gun (still on its wheels) after a Stuka raid during Eighth Army's advance to Tripoli, 1943.

As Eighth Army drove across North Africa, the regiment with 169 and 170 Btys (now with the new establishment of 18 Bofors guns per battery) was loaned to 1 AA Bde in January 1943 to cover Benghazi, Agedabia and the Desert Air Force's landing grounds, while 171 Bty (still with 12 Bofors) was attached to 2 LAA Rgt on the same duty. On 17 March 1943, the regiment with all three batteries transferred back to the command of 4th Indian Division at Ben Gardane.

After the conclusion of the Tunisian Campaign, the regiment returned to Egypt with the division, arriving at Agami on 6 July. On 16 August, it passed to the command of 78 AA Bde in Twelfth Army and moved to Suez. On 6 October, it travelled to Syria to rejoin 4th Indian Division at Djeide, arriving on 16 October. After reorganisation, the division returned to Egypt, reaching Tahag on 5 November and embarking at Port Said on 2 December.

==== Italy and Greece ====
57th LAA Regiment disembarked at Taranto on 9 December 1943 and remained with the division through the Italian campaign, including the bitter Battle of Monte Cassino. In July and August 1944 the division was clearing the mountain country approaching the Gothic Line, and then took part in Operation Olive against the Gothic Line outposts, capturing Gemmano on 15 September, pushing up to the Conca and clearing San Marino. This was followed by hard fighting at the crossing of the Marecchia (22–25 September).

On 10 October, it was decided that 4th Indian Division would be withdrawn from the fighting in Italy to become part of 'Manna Force', ready to land in Greece as the German troops there withdrew. Operation Manna got under way on 15 October, but the division was rested before its brigades were sent to Greece in turn. 57th LAA Rgt embarked at Taranto on 7 December with 5 Indian Brigade, disembarking at Piraeus, the port of Athens, on 13 December. Meanwhile, violent demonstrations (the Dekemvriana) had broken out 10 days earlier, and the Greek People's Liberation Army (ELAS) was in control of Piraeus when the troops arrived. There was considerable fighting for several days, with British detachments cut off. Men of 57th LAA Rgt slipped across the mouth of Piraeus Harbour to reinforce detachments of 64th LAA Rgt who were acting as infantry holding the oil installations and power station at St George's Bay. On the night of 20/21 December, these positions were mortared and attacked, but with the aid of star-shells and flares the LAA gunners beat them off. The following night, 5 Indian Brigade made an amphibious assault across the harbour and the area was secured by 27 December.

Even after the defeat of ELAS at Piraeus and Athens, tension was high in other areas. By 1 January 1945, 170 LAA Bty was at Salonika with 7 Indian Bde and 171 LAA Bty at Patras with 11 Indian Bde. RHQ and 169 LAA Bty arrived at Volos with 5 Indian Bde on 24 January. After a truce between the Greek government and the rebels was signed on 12 February, British forces were made responsible for disarming various rebel factions. 4th Indian Division was based at Salonika, with its troops covering western and eastern Macedonia and Western Thrace. 171 LAA Battery moved to Salonika on 26 February, and by 21 March the whole regiment was concentrated there under the divisional Commander, RA, until the end of the war.

The regiment was placed in suspended animation at Shirecliff Camp, Sheffield, on 5 January 1946.

== Postwar ==
When the TA was reconstituted in 1947, the two regiments reformed at Doncaster as 553rd (KOYLI) Light Anti-Aircraft Regiment and 557th (KOYLI) (M) Heavy Anti-Aircraft Regiment (the M indicating that it was a 'Mixed' unit with members of the Women's Royal Army Corps integrated into its personnel). Both regiments were in 65 AA Bde in Anti-Aircraft Command. On 1 January 1954, 557 HAA Rgt converted back to LAA as 557th (KOYLI) Light Anti-Aircraft Regiment.

AA Command was disbanded on 10 March 1955 and there were wholesale amalgamations amongst its units. 65 AA Brigade was disbanded, and both 553 and 557 (KOYLI) LAA Rgts were merged into 323 (West Riding) LAA Rgt at Sheffield, to which 553 and 557 Rgts only contributed 'R' (KOYLI) Bty.

== Insignia ==
In the 1920s, the battalion wore the KOYLI light infantry 'French horn' badge with silver rose centre on the shoulder straps in addition to the brass letters 'T/5/KOYLI'. When it was converted to Royal Artillery in 1938, it continued to wear its KOYLI cap badge and green light infantry whistle cords.

== Honorary Colonel ==
The following officers served as Honorary Colonel of the battalion:

- Col J.R. Shaw, appointed 1 January 1909
- Col C.C. Moxon, CMG, DSO, TD, former CO, appointed 1 January 1919
- Col W. St A. Warde-Adlam, DSO, appointed 14 September 1935

== Memorial ==
The World War I memorial to the 5th Bn KOYLI, bearing 1272 names of men who died, originally in the drill hall, is now in the KOYLI regimental museum in Doncaster Museum and Art Gallery.

== Victoria Cross recipients ==
Two members of the battalion won the Victoria Cross:

- Lt-Col Oliver Watson at Rossignol Wood, 27 March 1918
- Sgt Laurence Calvert at Havrincourt, 12 September 1918

== External sources ==
- Great War Centenary Drill Halls.
- Mark Conrad, British Army 1914 (archive site)
- The Drill Hall Project
- Imperial War Museum, War Memorials Register
- The Long, Long Trail
- The Regimental Warpath 1914–1918 (archive site)
- Royal Artillery 1939–1945
- Graham Watson, The Territorial Army 1947
- British Army units from 1945 on
- Whiteaway Papers (archive site)
