= 5th Battalion, York and Lancaster Regiment =

British Territorial Army unit

5th Battalion, York & Lancaster Regiment 67th (York & Lancaster Regiment) HAA Regiment 467 (York & Lancaster Regiment) HAA Regiment
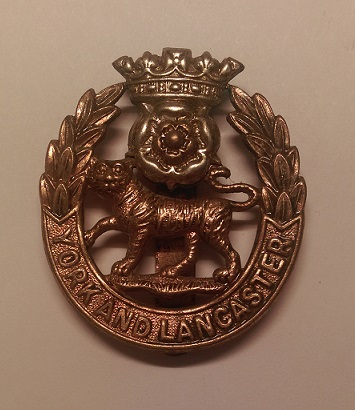
- Cap badge of the York & Lancaster Regiment with the Indian tiger and White Rose of York (the 'Cat and Cabbage')
- Active: 1 April 1908 – 10 March 1955
- Country: United Kingdom
- Branch: Territorial Army
- Role: Infantry; Air defence
- Size: 1-3 Infantry battalions Artillery regiment
- Part of: 148th (3rd West Riding) Brigade; 187th (2/3rd West Riding) Brigade; Anti-Aircraft Command; Fourteenth Army
- Garrison/HQ: Rotherham
- Engagements: World War I: Battle of the Somme; Battle of Bullecourt; Battle of Poelcapelle; Battle of Cambrai; German spring offensive; Hundred Days Offensive; World War II: Sheffield Blitz; Battle of Imphal; Tiddim Road; Battle of Meiktila

Commanders
- Notable commanders: Sir Walter Spencer-Stanhope, KCB, VD

The 5th Battalion, York and Lancaster Regiment, was a unit of Britain's Territorial Force formed in 1908 from Volunteer units originally raised in the West Riding of Yorkshire in 1860. It served in some of the bitterest fighting on the Western Front during World War I, including the Somme, Ypres and the German spring offensive. Before World War II it was converted to air defence, in which role it served during The Blitz and in Burma, where it employed anti-aircraft guns for 'bunker-busting'. Postwar, it continued to serve in Anti-Aircraft Command until 1955.

== Precursor units ==
The enthusiasm for the Volunteer movement following an invasion scare in 1859 saw the creation of many Rifle Volunteer Corps (RVCs) composed of part-time soldiers eager to supplement the Regular British Army in time of need. A large number of independent RVCs were raised in the West Riding of Yorkshire, including the 'Barnsley Rifles' and the 'Rotherham Rifles' and in August 1860 some of these were grouped into the 4th Administrative Battalion, Yorkshire West Riding RVCs, based at Doncaster (dates are those of the first officers' commissions):

- 18th (Pontefract) Yorkshire West Riding RVC, 2 March 1860
- 19th (Rotherham) Yorkshire West Riding RVC, 29 February 1860
- 20th (Doncaster, Great Northern Railway) Yorkshire West Riding RVC, 5 February 1860
- 21st (Doncaster Burgesses) Yorkshire West Riding RVC, 5 February 1860
- 36th (Rotherham) Yorkshire West Riding RVC, 19 October 1860, joined 4th Admin Bn 1862
- 37th (Barnsley) Yorkshire West Riding RVC, 21 November 1860, transferred from 3rd Admin Bn 1863
- 40th (Wath-upon-Dearne) Yorkshire West Riding RVC, March 1863, based at Hoyland Nether until 1866

The 20th RVC was recruited largely from employees of the Great Northern Railway (GNR) at Doncaster Works and was commanded by the railway's locomotive superintendent, Archibald Sturrock. The other units in the battalion were mainly recruited from coal mining and related industries. A Rotherham Rifle Band was formed and by August 1861 it was competing in brass band competitions.

Walter Spencer-Stanhope (1827–1911) of Cannon Hall and Horsforth Hall, a captain in the 2nd West Riding Yeomanry, who had raised the 36th RVC, was appointed lieutenant-colonel commanding the 4th Admin Bn on 11 February 1863. He later became Member of Parliament for the Southern Division of the West Riding (1872–80).

A drill hall was built at Wharncliffe Street, Rotherham, in 1873, prior to which the 18th and 36th RVCs had used the Court House and Corn Exchange in the town. A drill hall was also built in Eastgate, Barnsley, in 1897.

The RVCs in the 4th Admin Bn were consolidated as the 8th Yorkshire West Riding RVC at Doncaster in 1880, still under the command of Lt-Col Stanhope:

- A Company at Pontefract (former 18th RVC)
- B & E Companies at Rotherham (former 19th RVC)
- C Company at Doncaster (former 20th RVC)
- D Company at Doncaster (former 21st RVC)
- F & H Companies at Barnsley (former 37th RVC)
- G Company at Wath-upon-Dearne (former 40th RVC)
- J Company at Rotherham (former 36th RVC)

Lieutenant-Colonel Stanhope was promoted to colonel on 1 July 1881, was awarded a CB for his Volunteer work in 1887, and received the Volunteer Decoration (VD) in 1892. He finally retired from the command in 1895 and became Honorary Colonel of the battalion. He was knighted (KCB) in 1904. and died in 1911.

Under the 'Localisation of the Forces' introduced by the Cardwell Reforms, the 8th was linked with the 2nd (Hallamshire) West Riding RVC, the 3rd West Yorkshire Militia and the Regular 65th (2nd Yorkshire, North Riding) and 84th (York & Lancaster) Regiments into Brigade No 7 (West Riding of Yorkshire). When the 65th and 84th were amalgamated to create the York and Lancaster Regiment in 1881 as part of the Childers Reforms, the 8th West Riding RVC was formally attached to it, becoming the 2nd Volunteer Battalion, York & Lancaster Regiment in 1883. An additional company was raised in 1884, and a Rotherham Cadet Corps existed from 1894 to 1899.

The Stanhope Memorandum of December 1888 introduced a Mobilisation Scheme for Volunteer units, which would assemble in their own brigades at key points in case of war. In peacetime these brigades provided a structure for collective training. Under this scheme the Volunteer Battalions of the York & Lancaster Regiment were included in the East Yorkshire Brigade.

Volunteers from the battalion served in a Service Company alongside the Regulars of the regiment during the Second Boer War, gaining the battalion its first Battle Honour South Africa 1900–1902.

== Territorial Force ==
When the Volunteers were subsumed into the new Territorial Force (TF) under the Haldane Reforms of 1908, the battalion was split up: the companies from Rotherham (3), Barnsley (2) and Wath-upon-Dearne became 5th Battalion, York & Lancaster Regiment, while the companies from Doncaster (5) and Pontefract together with two companies from 1st VB King's Own Yorkshire Light Infantry (KOYLI) became 5th Bn KOYLI.

The new 5th York & Lancaster Bn was distributed as follows:

- HQ, A, B and F Companies, at the drill hall, Wharncliffe Street, Rotherham.
- C and E Companies at the drill hall in Eastgate, Barnsley
- D Company at the drill hall in Moor Road, Wath-upon-Dearne, built in 1911
- G and H Companies at 346 Sheffield Road, Birdwell

The two York & Lancaster TF battalions, together with those of the KOYLI, formed the III West Riding Brigade in the West Riding Division.

== World War I ==
=== Mobilisation ===
Towards the end of July 1914, the units of the West Riding Division left their headquarters for their annual training camps, but on 3 and 4 August they were ordered to return; on 4 August immediate mobilisation was ordered. The 5th York & Lancasters mobilised at Rotherham under the command of Lt-Col C. Fox, TD, who had been CO since 1 April 1914.

Shortly afterwards, TF units were invited to volunteer for Overseas Service and the majority of the battalion did so. On 15 August 1914, the War Office issued instructions to separate those men who had signed up for Home Service only, and form these into reserve units. On 31 August, the formation of a reserve or 2nd Line unit was authorised for each 1st Line unit where 60 per cent or more of the men had volunteered for Overseas Service. The titles of these 2nd Line units would be the same as the original, but distinguished by a '2/' prefix while the parent unit took '1/'. In this way duplicate battalions, brigades and divisions were created, mirroring those TF formations being sent overseas. Later they were mobilised for overseas service in their own right, and 3rd Line or Reserve units were formed.

=== 1/5th Battalion ===
After mobilisation, the 1st West Riding Division concentrated in the South Yorkshire area, and began training for war. On 31 March it was informed that it had been selected to proceed to France to join the British Expeditionary Force (BEF), and the battalion landed at Boulogne on 14 April. On 18–19 April platoons from the III West Riding Bde were attached to 8th Division for training in the routine of trench duties. On 28 April the West Riding Division took over its own section of the line at Fleurbaix. It now formed part of IV Corps, which attacked at the Battle of Aubers Ridge on 9 May. While the other two divisions of IV Corps made the actual attack, the West Riding Division took over the greater part of the corps' trench line. It was supposed to follow up and occupy the captured enemy line, but the breakthrough did not occur.

On 12 May the division was designated 49th (West Riding) Division and the brigade became 148th (3rd West Riding).

For the next nine months the 49th Division took part in no major operations but was almost continuously engaged in day-to-day trench warfare, much of it in the Ypres Salient, with the considerable casualties that this entailed. On 19 December the division received a sudden attack with the new German phosgene gas, followed by heavy shelling, but no serious infantry attack followed. In January 1916 the division was withdrawn for its first period of complete rest since it first entered the line.

==== Somme ====
At the beginning of February the battalion machine gunners left to join 148 Brigade Machine Gun Company. That month the division moved to the Somme sector, 1/5th York & Lancasters under Lt-Col Shuttleworth Rendell proceeding to Oissy. Here the division spent the next few months alternating trench duties with working parties and training for the forthcoming Somme Offensive. For this the 49th Division formed the reserve for X Corps, which was tasked with seizing the Thiepval Spur, after which the 49th was to pass through and continue the pursuit. The 1/5th York & Lancasters moved up to assembly trenches in Aveluy Wood before dawn on the day of the attack (1 July), and at 13.30 moved up to the British front trenches alongside the River Ancre, Lt-Col Rendell taking C and D Companies to the south while Major Shaw took A and B Companies to the north. The battalion attempted to assist 108 Bde of the 36th (Ulster) Division, which had made good progress but had become cut off. After the failure of the first day, the York & Lancasters spent the next week in confused fighting along the Ancre. On 6 July, the battalion sent forward two bombing parties totalling seven officers and 80 other ranks to capture a trench: of these only 22 other ranks returned, the CO, Lt-Col Rendell, being left behind wounded in a German dugout, and Maj Shaw killed. By the time the battalion was relieved at 20.30 on 8 July it had suffered a total of 307 casualties.

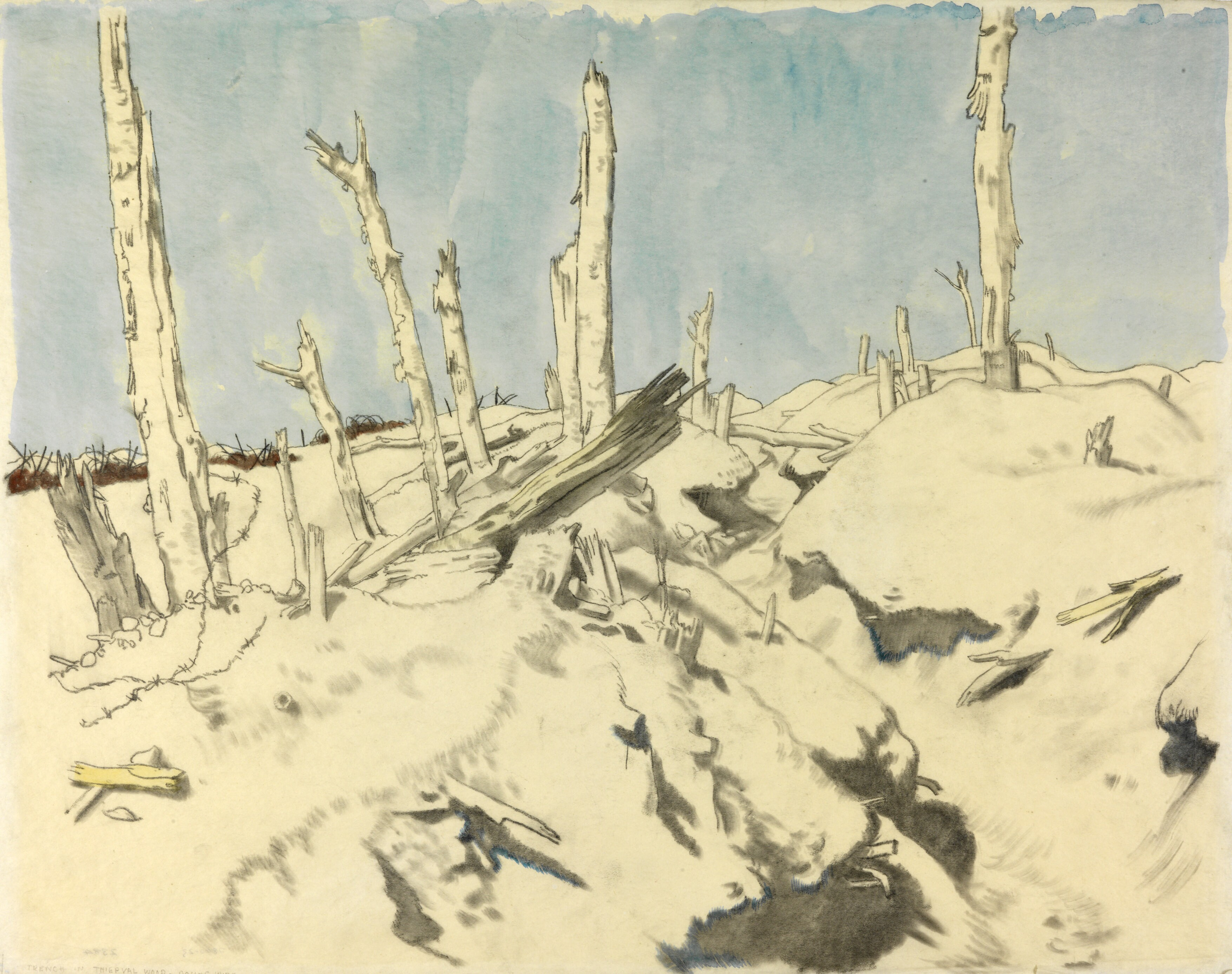
William Orpen, A Trench, Thiepval – German wire.

By 14 July the British had taken the Leipzig Redoubt on the Thiepval Spur, and while the offensive continued 49th Division remained holding this area, with a number of small actions and suffering a good deal of shelling, at the same time preparing trenches and dumps for a renewed attack. This attack was made on 3 September, at the end of the Battle of Pozières, but 5th York & Lancasters was not directly involved in the failed action. 49th Division continued minor operations towards Thiepval during the Battle of Flers-Courcelette (15–22 September) before the offensive petered out.

==== Ypres ====
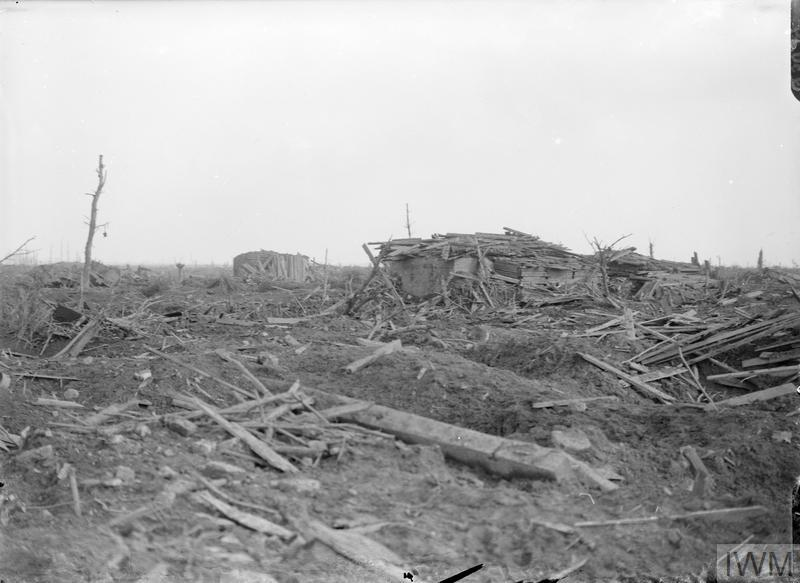
The ruins of Poelcapelle before the battle.

During the summer of 1917 the 49th Division was earmarked for operations along the Flanders coast that failed to materialise. In October it was moved to the Ypres sector to join the Third Ypres Offensive. It took part in the Battle of Poelcapelle on 9 October, with 148 Bde on the left and 146 (1st West Yorkshire) Bde in the centre of the attack. The troops had a long night approach march in rain across appalling ground under shellfire, and only just reached the jumping-off tapes in time for Zero. When the attack went in at 05.20, the rain stopped so that the German defenders had perfect visibility. 148 Brigade was immediately stopped by a flooded stream, leaving 146 Bde to advance alone. They managed a few hundred yards before being stopped by a broad belt of undamaged German barbed wire. The division was now pinned down under fire from artillery, riflemen hidden in shell craters, and from machine guns in German pillboxes on the higher ground ahead. Although some of these pillboxes were taken, the division's attacking troops were back at their start line by the afternoon, having suffered heavy casualties.

==== Spring Offensive ====
Once 2/5th Bn York & Lancasters was disbanded at the end of January 1918 (see below), the 1/5th became simply '5th Bn' once more. 49th Division remained in the Ypres area during the winter of 1917–18 and was therefore not involved in the first stage of the German spring offensive. However, when the second phase (Operation Georgette, or the Battle of the Lys) began on 9 April, it soon began to put pressure on the southern part of the Ypres Salient. Brigade groups from 49th Division were sent south to support other British formations. On 10 April it was the turn of 148 Bde, which moved to Neuve Eglise; that night 5th York & Lancasters was attached to 74 Bde of 25th Division fighting near Steenwerck, south of Nieppe (the Battle of Estaires). The battalion carried out a 'dashing' attack on Cabaret du Saule on 11 April. It remained attached to 74 Bde through the Battle of Bailleul, fighting stubbornly on the Mont De Lille on 14 April, until relieved on 16 April, earning the praise of 74 Bde's commander.

After a five-day pause, the German offensive was renewed on 25 April. 5th York & Lancasters was with 148 Bde in corps reserve at Poperinghe and was not involved in the action at Mont Kemmel when the German Alpenkorps seized the dominating hill (the Second Battle of Kemmel Ridge). However, the Germans were unable to follow up this success and over the next three days 148 Bde was able to improvise a line behind the ridge, pushing Lewis gun teams well forward to command the valley. When the Germans attacked on 29 April (the Battle of the Scherpenberg), they were stopped dead by rifle and machine gun fire.

==== Hundred Days Offensive ====
The battalion returned to the fighting during the Allied Hundred Days Offensive. During the pursuit to the River Selle, 49th Division was ordered to attack on 12 October, but patrols found that the enemy had disappeared, so the barrage was cancelled and zero hour was brought forward. The division established a line along the edge of the high ground overlooking the Selle, the opposite bank of which was strongly held. However, when 147 (2nd West Riding) and 148 Bdes went forward next morning they were observed and suffered severely from a German barrage and fire from machine guns across the river that had been missed by the British barrage. They made little progress and were eventually withdrawn to a position only slightly ahead of their starting line. However, the division seized Saulzoir and established small bridgeheads over the Selle on the night on 14/15 October.

After the BEF had forced the river line (the Battle of the Selle), there was a pause before the next bound of the pursuit. On the night of 1/2 November 148 Bde returned to the line in front of Valenciennes. Its task was to seize the defended steelworks, which had repulsed the rest of the division the day before. The attack (the Battle of Valenciennes) went in at 05.30 and was successful, though the steelworks was not secured until 16.00. On 3 November the brigade went forward again under the command of 56th (1st London) Division, meeting no opposition as they pursued the defeated enemy.

The division was relieved after this attack, and its infantry was still resting near Douai when the Armistice with Germany came into force on 11 November. Demobilisation began in January 1919 and was virtually complete by the end of March. The 5th York & Lancasters was disembodied on 20 June 1919.

=== 2/5th Battalion ===
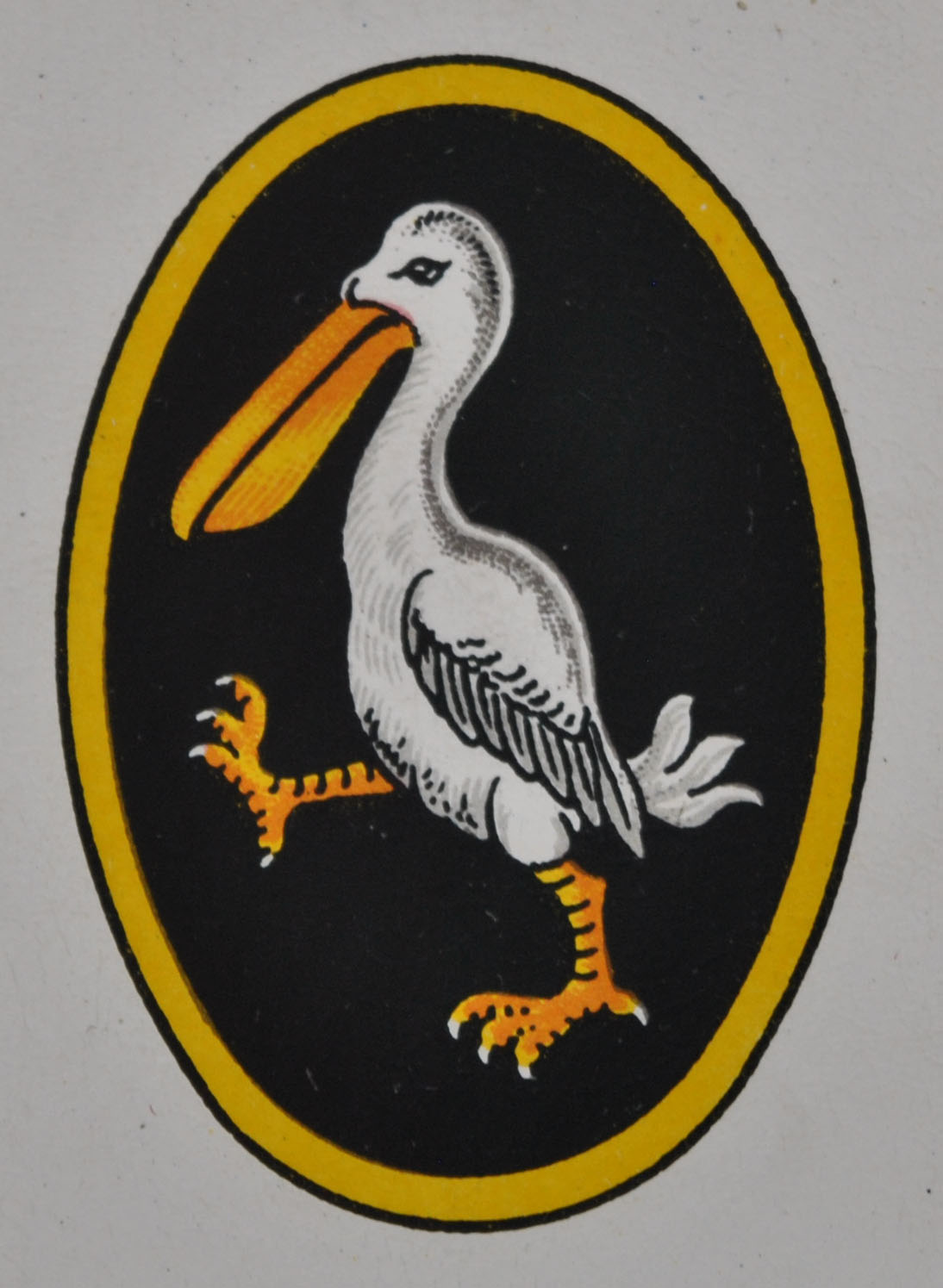
62nd (2nd West Riding) Division's pelican sign (called a duck by the troops): 'when t'duck puts foot down, t'war'll be ower'.

The 2/5th Bn York & Lancasters was formed at Rotherham on 3 October 1914. and became part of the 2/3rd West Riding Bde in the 2nd West Riding Division. These were later numbered 187 Bde and 62nd Division respectively.

Until April 1915 they had no weapons with to train. Some Lee-Enfield rifles were then received, but these were withdrawn in May, and until the beginning of 1916 the 2nd Line Territorials had to make do with .256-in Japanese Ariska rifles, keeping their ammunition in their pockets until 1914 pattern webbing equipment arrived. With these antiquated weapons the 62nd Division was under orders to move at short notice to defend the East Coast, for which railway trains were kept in readiness. Training was also disrupted by the frequent calls to supply reinforcement drafts to the 1st line serving on the Western Front. In May 1915 the Home Service men of 187 Bde were withdrawn to form 26th Provisional Battalion serving in coast defence in North East England. In October, the division's 2nd Line battalions were reduced to 600 all ranks, the unfit men being posted to the 26th Provisional Bn and the surplus to the 3rd Line, which became the draft-finding unit.

In May 1915 the division moved into camp in 'The Dukeries' area of Nottinghamshire, where it trained until October, when it concentrated round Retford. It then went into the Tyne defences where it dug an entrenched defence line in December. It moved to Larkhill Camp on Salisbury Plain for battle training in January 1916 and finally received SMLE Mk III rifles and Lewis guns, but in June it was sent to the East Coast defences once more, where it was scattered round East Anglia. Here battle training was less convenient and it was again called upon to provide drafts to the Western Front. In October it moved inland to Bedfordshire and Northamptonshire.

Finally, in October 1916, orders were received to bring the division up to full establishment and prepare for overseas service. Embarkation began at Southampton on 5 January 1917, and the division completed its concentration in France on 18 January. It took its place in the line in the Somme sector opposite Serre. Shortly afterwards, the German army began a planned retreat to the Hindenburg Line (Operation Alberich) and from 15 February to 19 March the division's units were engaged in patrol work and stiff actions against rearguards while advancing across the devastated (and booby-trapped) ground until that line was reached. The division was then shifted to the line opposite Bullecourt in the southern part of the Arras sector.

==== Bullecourt ====
Part of 62nd Division was involved in the failed first attack at Bullecourt on 11 April and in repulsing the German counter-attack at Lagnicourt on 15 April, but 187 Bde was not engaged in major action until the main Battle of Bullecourt opened on 3 May. The division spent the preceding 17 days in rehearsals and the whole division attacked in waves behind tanks and a heavy barrage, with 187 Brigade on the left. The first wave advanced at 03.37 (eight minutes before Zero) to cross 900 yards (820 m) of No man's land. They reached the first German line but had lost cohesion before they reached the second. Brigade HQ ordered a second attack in two waves, but this 'ended miserably in shell-holes' and at about 16.00 the division withdrew to a railway embankment where it was relieved. It was not until 17 May that the division finally cleared the village, and operations against the Hindenburg Line continued until 28 May.

After rest and reorganisation, 62nd Division returned to the line in June and began a period of several months of trench-holding.

==== Cambrai ====
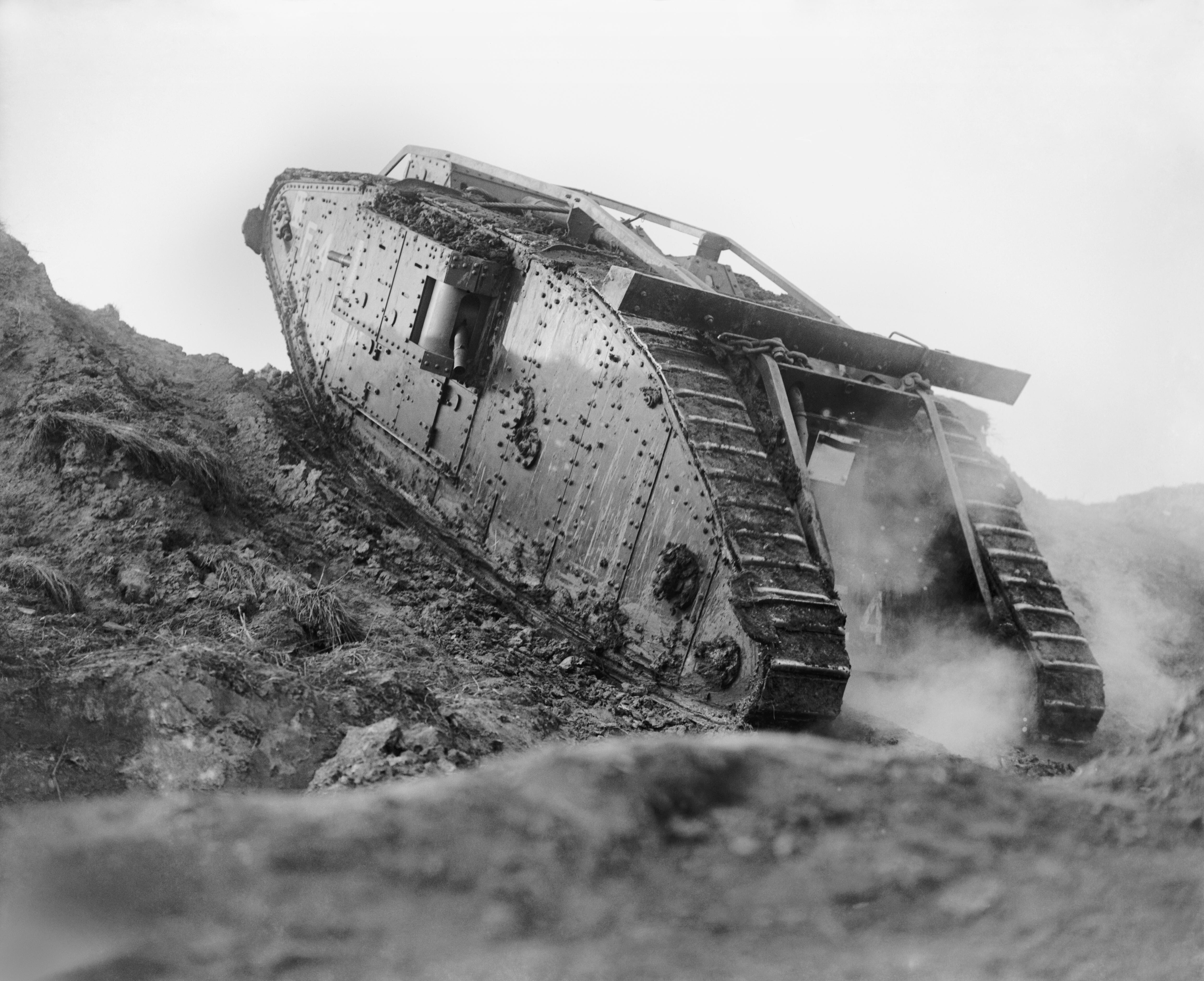
Mark IV Tank (female) training at Wailly 21 October 1917 for the Battle of Cambrai.

62nd Division moved into hutments at Beaulencourt in October 1917, where it trained for open warfare in preparation for the forthcoming Battle of Cambrai, including training with the Tank Corps at Wailly. On the night of 17/18 November 187 Bde took up its positions in Havrincourt Wood.

The surprise attack was launched at dawn on 20 November, with no preceding bombardment; the artillery crashed down on its targets at zero hour. The brigade advanced with Mark IV tanks of G Battalion and a company of I BattalionTank Corps towards its first objective, Havrincourt village. Despite galling fire from Havrincourt Chateau, the KOYLI battalions and tanks took the village by 08.30. Shortly afterwards the second wave of York & Lancasters and supporting tanks passed through, with 2/5th as the right-hand battalion, moving north across the communication trenches between the Hindenburg line and the German support line and meeting little resistance. Within two hours the battalion had secured the second objective at the cost of fewer than 80 casualties. By 11.30 the British had taken almost the whole of the Hindenburg Main and Support Lines over the frontage of the attack. 186th (2/2nd West Riding) Brigade then passed through to the next objective at Graincourt. Further progress was held up by the failure of 51st (Highland) Division to take Flesquières, leaving 62nd Division's right flank uncovered.

The divisional objective for the second day of the attack (21 November) was Bourlon Wood, led by 186 Bde with 185 (2/1st West Riding) Bde in close support and 187 Bde in reserve. However, there were fewer tanks available and progress was slower than on the first day. Anneux was taken but Bourlon Wood remained out of reach. At dawn on 22 November, a heavy barrage and counter-attack hit the leading units of the division and a company of 2/5th York & Lancasters was sent forward to help restore the situation. This fighting ended any further advances. 62nd Division was relieved by 40th Division in a tricky operation that night.

The division was back in Bourlon Wood on 27 November for another attempt to complete its capture. 187 Brigade led on the left at 06.20 with 16 of the remaining tanks to take Bourlon Village. It was dark and snowing: by 10.00 the attack had failed and the brigade had been driven out of Bourlon. It was relieved at the end of the day. The division had however succeeded in taking the last of Bourlon Ridge, which had been fought over for a week. The exhausted West Riding division was then relieved (under a hail of German gas shells) before the German counter-attack took back all the hard-won ground a few days later.

==== Disbandment ====
By the beginning of 1918 the BEF was suffering a manpower crisis and the decision was made to break up one battalion in each infantry brigade. 2/5th York & Lancasters was selected and on 3 February its men were drafted as reinforcements to the 1/4th and 1/5th Bns York & Lancasters in 49th Division, and 2/4th Bn in 187 Bde.

=== 3/5th Battalion ===
The 3/5th Bn was formed at Strensall on 25 March 1915 and then moved to Clipstone Camp in Nottinghamshire where its role was to train drafts for the 1st ad 2nd Line battalions. On 8 April it was renamed the 5th Reserve Bn York & Lancasters and on 1 September it was absorbed by the 4th Reserve Bn.

=== 26th Provisional Battalion ===
In 1915 the Home Service men of the 5th York & Lancasters, together with those of several other West Riding TF battalions, were combined into the 26th Provisional Battalion at York, which served in home defence with 2nd Provisional Brigade. It appears to have been disbanded before the Military Service Act 1916 swept away the Home/Foreign service distinction, and all TF soldiers became liable for overseas service, if medically fit.

== Interwar ==
TF units reformed on 1 February 1920 and the following year the TF was reorganised as the Territorial Army. 5th Battalion York & Lancasters were once again in 148th (3rd West Riding) Bde of 49th (West Riding) Division.

=== Anti-Aircraft conversion ===
During the 1930s the increasing need for anti-aircraft (AA) defence for Britain's cities was addressed by converting a number of TA infantry battalions into AA units. The 5th York & Lancasters was one of the battalions selected, becoming 67th (The York & Lancaster Regiment) Anti-Aircraft Brigade, Royal Artillery on 10 December 1936 and completing the conversion by December 1937. It consisted of HQ Battery with 187th, 188th and 189th AA Batteries and 67 Machine Gun Battery at Rotherham and formed part of 31st (North Midland) AA Group in 2 AA Division. 67 Machine Gun Bty was converted into 198 AA Bty on 1 May 1937. When Royal Artillery (RA) gun brigades were redesignated as regiments on 1 January 1939, the AA groups were redesignated as brigades. 31 AA Brigade transferred to the newly formed 7 AA Division during 1939.

== World War II ==
=== Mobilisation ===
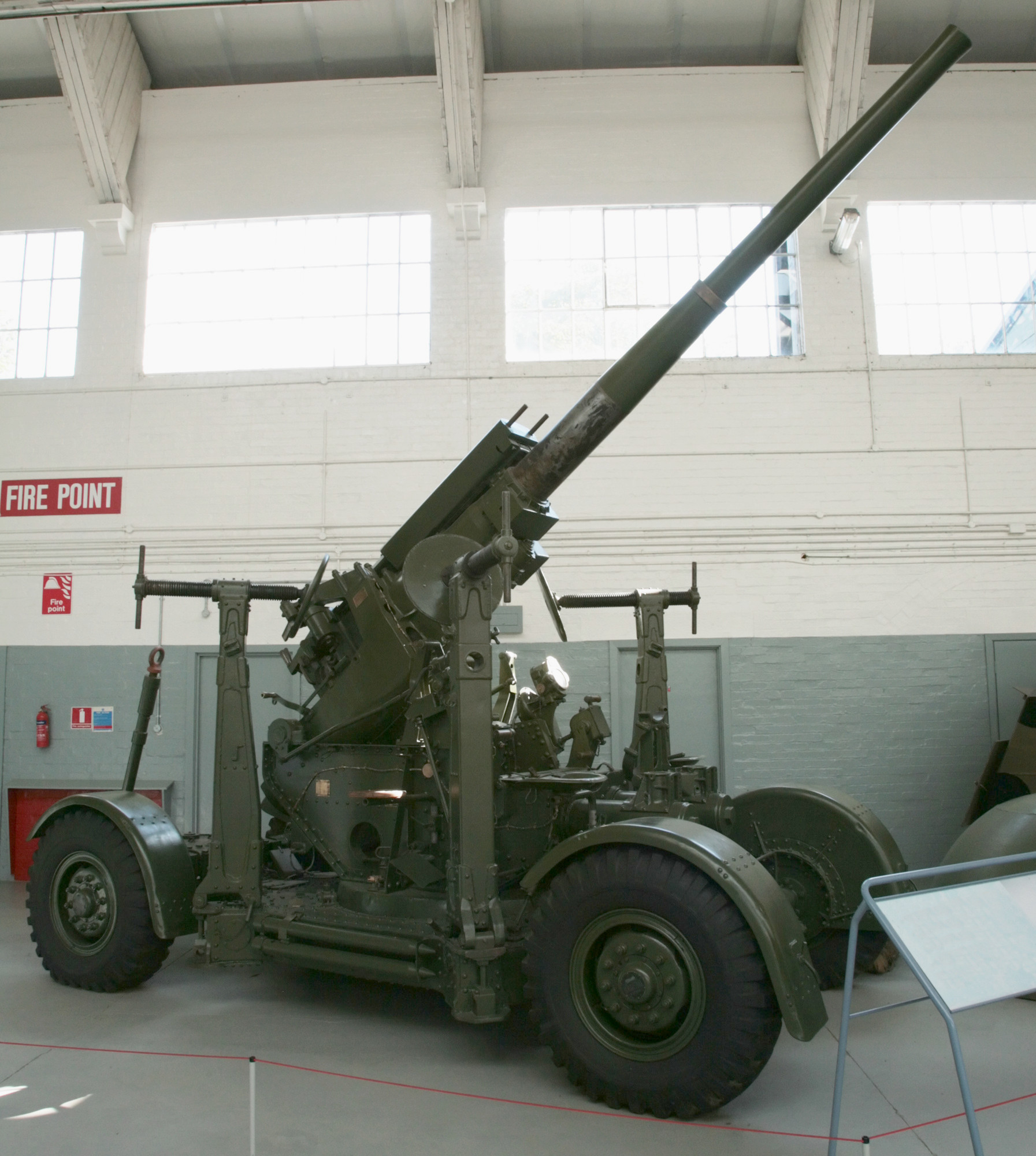
3.7-inch HAA gun preserved at Imperial War Museum Duxford.

The TA's AA units were mobilised on 23 September 1938 during the Munich Crisis, with units manning their emergency positions within 24 hours, even though many did not yet have their full complement of men or equipment. The emergency lasted three weeks, and they were stood down on 13 October. In February 1939 the existing AA defences came under the control of a new Anti-Aircraft Command. In June a partial mobilisation of TA units was begun in a process known as 'couverture', whereby each AA unit did a month's tour of duty in rotation to man selected AA and searchlight positions. On 24 August, ahead of the declaration of war, AA Command was fully mobilised at its war stations.

On mobilisation, 67th AA Rgt deployed in the Sheffield Gun Zone as part of 39 AA Bde in 7 AA Division (shortly afterwards reverting to 2 AA Division), with 23 heavy AA guns deployed. The brigade already referred to its AA gun regiments (equipped with 3-inch, 3.7-inch or 4.5-inch guns) as HAA (to distinguish them from the newer light AA or LAA units that were being formed); this became official across the Royal Artillery on 1 June 1940. However, due to the shortage of equipment at this stage of the war, HAA units sometimes had to provide Lewis gun Light machine gun (LMG) detachments in the LAA role to defend Vital Points (VPs). On 17 September 67th HAA Rgt temporarily took over the VPs at Orgreave, South Yorkshire, and by early 1940 was also manning sites at Thorncliffe, West Yorkshire, Chesterfield and elsewhere. At the beginning of March 1940 the brigade's first Gun-laying Mk I radar set became operational in the Sheffield Gun Zone.

=== Battle of Britain and Blitz ===
Formation sign of 2 AA Division.

Incursions by Luftwaffe aircraft over the Humber Estuary became more frequent in May and June 1940. By the end of June 67th HAA Rgt had given up responsibility for VPs, and due to rotation of batteries 198 HAA Bty was under 62nd (Northumbrian) HAA Rgt in the Humber Gun Zone, while Regimental HQ was commanding its own 187 and 189 HAA Btys, and 173 HAA Bty from 62nd HAA Rgt, with a total of 23 HAA guns. In July it was also joined by 'D' Bty Royal Marines. As the Battle of Britain got under way, night intruders appeared over the Sheffield Gun Zone and were fired upon without effect.

When the night Blitz began over London in September, the gunners of 188 and later 189 HAA Btys were loaned to 1 AA Division to man guns covering the London Inner Artillery Zone, while 270 and two Troops of 286 HAA Bty from 91st HAA Rgt in the Humber Gun Zone arrived to augment 67th HAA Rgt at Sheffield. The CO of 67th HAA Rgt was acting as AA Defence Commander (AADC), Sheffield Gun Zone, with his HQ at the drill hall at Rotherham. During November, AA Command scraped together a further 16 mobile 3.7-inch guns for Sheffield, to be manned by various batteries under the AADC.

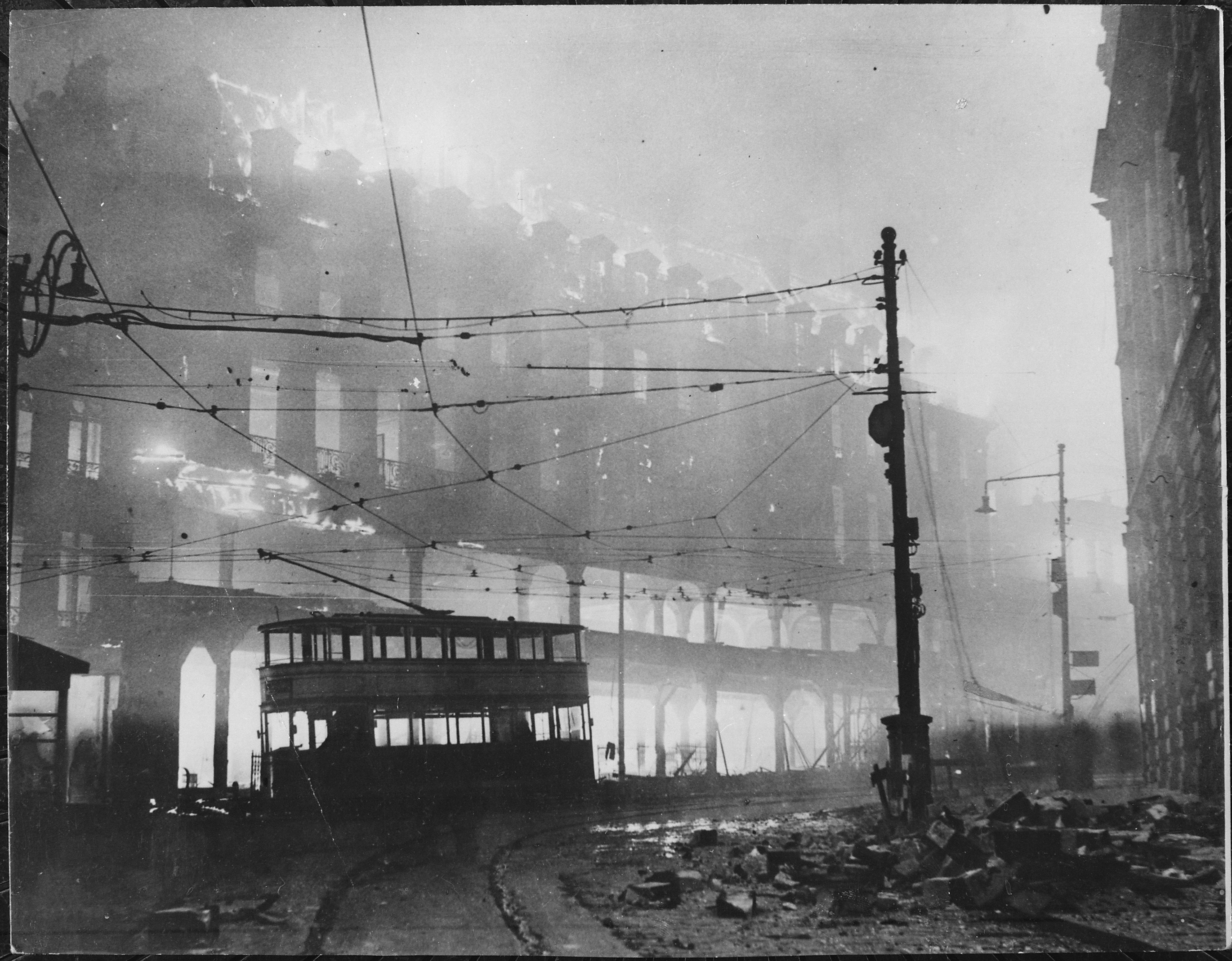
Devastation in Sheffield city centre during the Blitz.

Sheffield and Rotherham were badly bombed on the night of 12/13 December (the start of the Sheffield Blitz), with continuous raids from the east and south between 18.00 and 04.00, These began with incendiary bombs to mark the targets, followed by high explosive bombs. The Humber guns engaged some of the raiders on their way to the target, and the Sheffield guns fired over 3700 rounds; two aircraft were claimed as shot down. Apart from a couple of bombs on an English Steel Company works there was little damage to industry, but there were around 400 civilian casualties, about 100 of them fatal. The bombers returned with incendiary bombs on 15/16 December.

188 HAA Battery returned from detachment after the first raid, and the inexperienced 117th HAA Rgt arrived in January and had been trained on the gunsites by experienced gunners. There was some further bombing in the Sheffield area on the nights of 9/10 and 15/16 January, though the actual targets of these raids were Manchester and Humberside respectively.

The regiment sent a cadre to 209th Training Regiment at Blandford Camp to provide the basis for a new 387 Bty; this was formed on 14 November 1940 and later joined 121st HAA Rgt

On 8 February 1941, 67th HAA Rgt transferred to 50 Light AA Bde covering Derby and Nottingham. The Luftwaffe attempted to bomb Derby on the night of 8/9 May, but most crews attacked Nottingham in error, leading to the Nottingham Blitz – one of the last significant raids of the Luftwaffe's Blitz campaign. By this stage 50 LAA Bde was concentrating on LAA guns and searchlights, and 67th HAA Rgt had transferred to a new 66 AA Bde controlling the HAA guns.

=== Overseas ===
67th HAA Regiment left AA Command in July 1941 and joined the War Office Reserve preparatory to going overseas. The establishment for overseas regiments was only three batteries, so 198 HAA Bty remained in the UK and on 14 September joined a new 136th HAA Rgt. This regiment never went overseas and was disbanded in 1946.

67th HAA Regiment embarked as part of the reinforcements for the British forces in Egypt, arriving on 23 December under the command of Lt-Col H.H.M. Oliver. However, it only stayed a month: the rapid progress of the Japanese invasion of Malaya begun on 7/8 December meant that reinforcements were urgently needed for India and 67th HAA Rgt was among the units re-embarked. It landed at Bombay on 1 February 1942.

=== Burma ===
On arrival, 67th HAA Rgt immediately moved to Calcutta, where it came under 1 Indian AA Bde, which was responsible for the air defence of the industrial areas and airfields of the city. Shortly afterwards it moved up the Manipur Road under the newly arrived 9 AA Bde that took responsibility for the Assam/Burma frontier.

As the Japanese advanced though Burma, they began air raids against Allied airfields and facilities in Assam from October 1942, and these progressed to South-East Bengal, Chittagong and Calcutta itself by December. 9 AA Brigade deployed batteries of 8 HAA guns at each of 15 airfields, as well as defending key supply points for the First Arakan offensive. 187 HAA Bty was detached with IV Corps.

After the failure of the Arakan offensive there was a pause during the Monsoon. Then in October the newly created Fourteenth Army moved forward again, with 67th HAA Rgt (less 189 HAA Bty, which remained with 9 AA Bde until late November 1943) moving up to the Imphal area under IV Corps.

==== Battle of Imphal ====
In early 1944, the Japanese launched Operation U-Go to forestall the Allied advance. Fourteenth Army based its defences on the Imphal Plain, with IV Corps well forward. As Corps HAA regiment, 67th HAA Rgt was deployed to defend the airfields around Imphal. When the Japanese attacks swept round these vital airfields they became the centres of defended localities, and the regiment's guns provided Counter-battery fire and defensive fire, as well as AA defence. By June, when the Kohima–Imphal road was reopened, the regiment claimed 13 'kills' from 839 AA rounds fired, but had already fired over 5000 rounds on ground targets in the Battle of Imphal. XXXIII Indian Corps now took over the lead, 67th HAA Rgt being relieved of its AA duties and transferring to this corps in the medium artillery role. It used field-gun fuzes for its ammunition for 'bunker-busting' as the Japanese were evicted from their positions in the Manipur hills.

==== Advance to Tiddim ====
5th Indian Division continued to advance on Tiddim during the Monsoon rains. 67th HAA Regiment forced its way along the Tiddim road in support, mostly shooting at ground targets, but also providing working parties and vehicles to help the advance, 'its great Matador gun tractors skidding and winching their way along tracks with their 3.7-inch HAA guns'. It helped to reduce the enemy garrison at Tiddim with accurate long-range ground fire and then 'climbed the high ground of the Kennedy Peak feature with 5th Indian Division, no easy task as tracks had to be bulldozed to take heavy vehicles, the steep slopes required vehicles and guns to be winched up them and enemy bunkers had to be blasted clear by concentrated fire. Supplies of all kinds, including AA ammunition, were delivered by air to maintain the advance'. Tiddim fell on 17 October and Kennedy Peak was captured in early November.

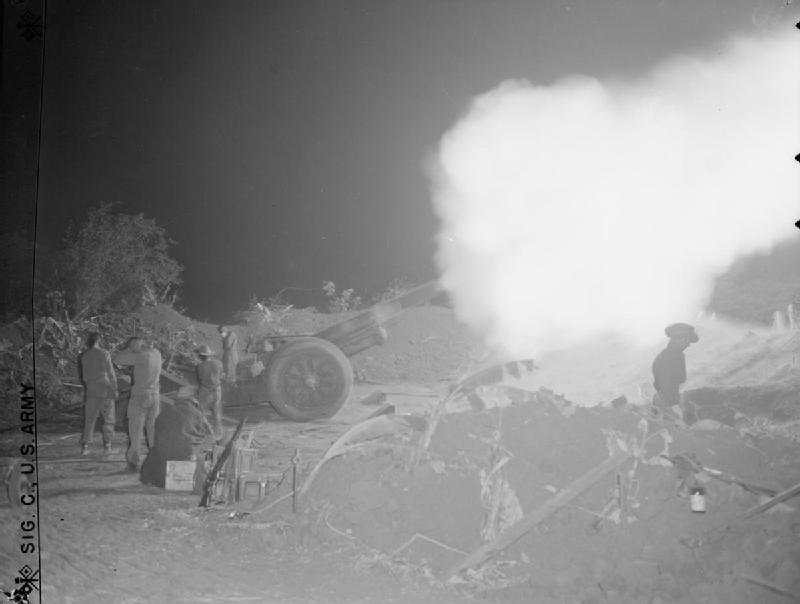
7.2-inch howitzer firing in Burma, 1945.

As the next phase of operations (Operation Extended Capital) was being prepared, 67th HAA Rgt reverted to being an infantry unit, handing over all its equipment to 1st West African HAA Rgt. However, in December a detachment of 187 HAA Bty returned to Imphal and took over two of the recently arrived 7.2-inch howitzers, which were to be used for 'bunker-busting' on IV Corps' front. The howitzer detachment left Imphal on 24 December and moved up via Tamu and the Kabaw Valley into the Irrawaddy bridgehead at Pagan.

Moving these heavy guns through the jungle and Paddy fields into firing positions took enormous labour, and often required extra recovery vehicles and bulldozers. Sergeant E. Parnell of 187 HAA Bty recalled that normally the howitzers went forward at first light to join the infantry, who would identify the target, usually a bunker. This would be engaged over open sights, sometimes after an air strike or field guns had blown away any camouflage to reveal the target. On one occasion the detachment cooperated with a Stinson L-5 Sentinel air observation post aircraft to obtain a direct hit on a Japanese 155 mm gun hidden under a building on stilts at Chauk. During these engagements there was pressure to achieve early hits and to couple the gun up to its tractor and withdraw before the Japanese retaliated with mortar fire.

==== Meiktila ====
In January 1945 the rest of the regiment resumed its AA role with 16 x 3.7-inch HAA guns and moved up from Imphal to rejoin IV Corps at the Irrawaddy. The guns and GL radar trailers covered 350 miles (560 km), often having to be 'double tractored' and winched up gradients of 1 in 5. 187 HAA Battery was deployed to defend Sinthe airfield as soon as it was captured, 188 HAA Bty covered the river crossings at Myitche, and 189 HAA Bty was detached to 17th Indian Division across the Irrawaddy at Pauk and went speeding on with it to Meiktila to cut off the Japanese force in Mandalay. As it covered the 80 miles (130 km) route, the motorised striking force was dependent on air supply. Meiktila airfield was captured on 24 February, and 189 HAA Bty deployed to protect it. The battery came under repeated air and ground attacks and was frequently mortared and shelled before the Capture of Meiktila was completed on 4 March. After Meiktila, Fourteenth Army was able to advance on Mandalay, which fell on 21 March.

On 20 March the regiment handed its 7.2-inch howitzers over to 52nd (London) HAA Rgt, which replaced 67th in IV Corps. At the end of April the regiment was at Myingyan under Fourteenth Army, and in May it came under the command of 24 AA Bde, which took over air defence in the Meiktila area. However, with the Monsoon rains approaching, the policy of Allied Land Forces South East Asia was to send long-serving British units back to India and replace them with Indian units. On 17 May, 67th HAA Rgt was flown back to India, although a cadre of the regiment arrived in Rangoon on 13 June after its capture the previous month.

The Surrender of Japan came in August 1945, and the regiment with its three batteries was placed in suspended animation in India between 31 October 1945 and 1 February 1946.

== Postwar ==
When the TA was reconstituted in 1947, the regiment reformed at Rotherham as 467 (The York & Lancaster Regiment) (Mixed) Heavy Anti-Aircraft Regiment, RA, ('Mixed' indicating that members of the Women's Royal Army Corps were integrated into the unit). It formed part of 65 AA Bde (the former 39 AA Bde) at Doncaster.

When AA Command was disbanded on 10 March 1955, there was a reduction in the number of AA units in the TA. 467 HAA Regiment merged into 271 (Sheffield) Field Rgt, becoming 'R' (5th York & Lancaster) Bty. On 1 May 1961, R Bty amalgamated with 865 Locating Bty, RA, and reverted to infantry as B (Barnsley) Company of the Hallamshire Battalion, York & Lancaster Rgt.

== Honorary Colonel ==
The following officers served as Honorary Colonel of the battalion:

- Sir Walter Spencer-Stanhope, KCB, VD, former CO, was appointed as Honorary Colonel of the 2nd VB on 13 February 1895, and continued as Hon Col of the 5th York & Lancasters when it was formed in 1908.
- Lt-Col T.W.H. Mitchell, VD, appointed 22 April 1914
- Lt-Col C. Fox, TD, appointed 22 April 1921
- Col S. Rhodes, CB, DSO, TD, appointed 12 November 1930

== Uniforms and insignia ==
The uniform of the 8th Yorkshire West Riding RVC was scarlet with green facings. The 2nd VB adopted the white facings of the York & Lancaster Regiment.

When the 5th Bn was converted to artillery in 1936, all ranks continued to wear York & Lancaster Rgt cap badges with RA collar badges and shoulder titles. The cap badges were replaced by RA badges in 1940.

During World War II 67th HAA Rgt is believed to have worn a regimental flash consisting of a flaming grenade badge embroidered in yellow on a green over blue diamond with the colours separated by a thin yellow horizontal line.
