= Oliver Cyril Spencer Watson =

Recipient of the Victoria Cross

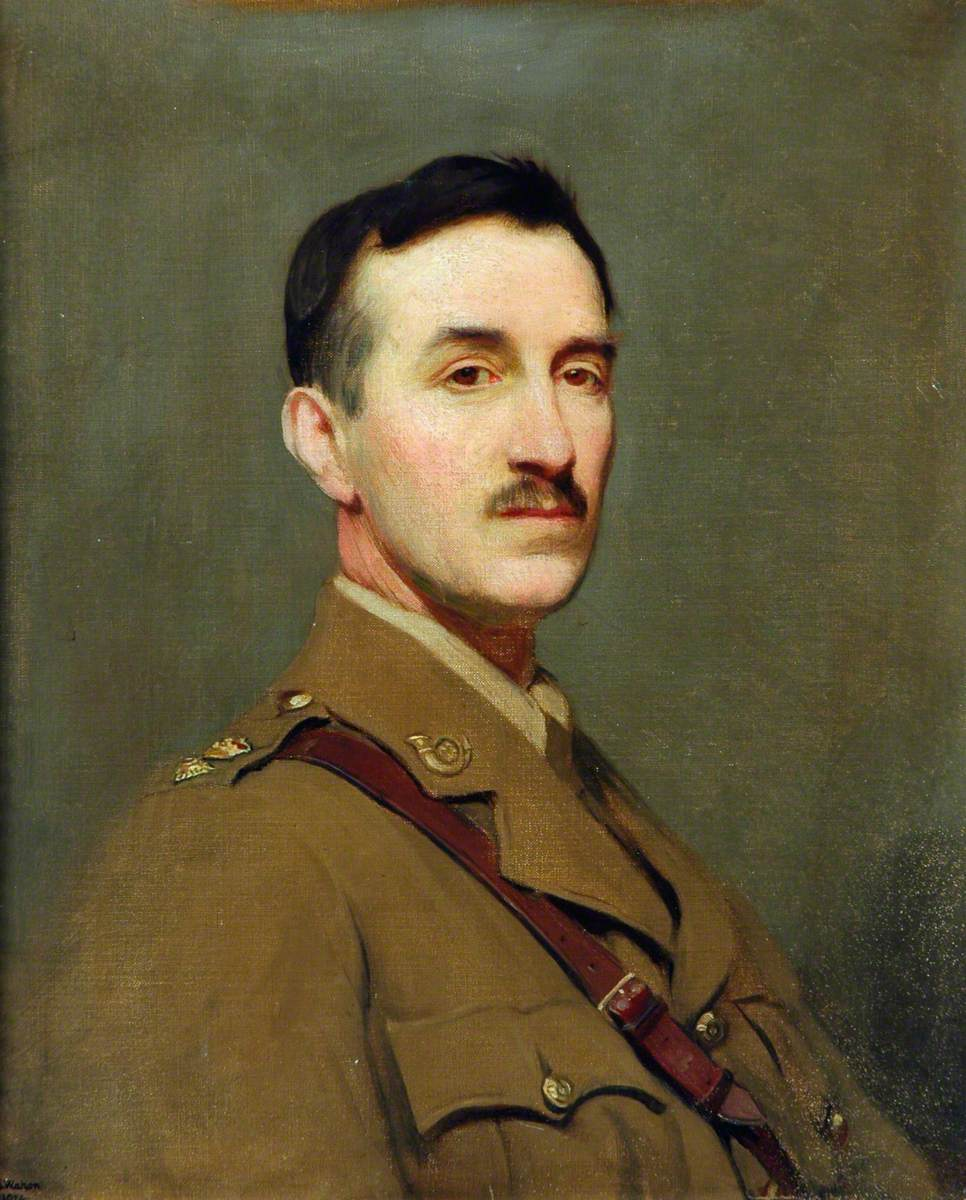
- Born: 7 September 1876; Westminster, London
- Died: 28 March 1918 (aged 41); Rossignol Wood, France
- Military career
- Allegiance: United Kingdom
- Branch: British Army
- Service years: 1897 – 1904; 1909 – 1918
- Rank: Lieutenant Colonel
- Units: Green Howards; 1st County of London Yeomanry (Middlesex, Duke of Cambridge's Hussars)
- Commands: 5th Battalion, King's Own Yorkshire Light Infantry
- Conflicts: Tirah Campaign (WIA); Boxer Rebellion; First World War: Gallipoli campaign; Western Front; Battle of Arras (WIA); Hundred Days Offensive †
- Awards: Victoria Cross; Distinguished Service Order

Oliver Cyril Spencer Watson VC DSO (7 September 1876 – 28 March 1918) was an English posthumous recipient of the Victoria Cross, the highest and most prestigious award for gallantry in the face of the enemy that can be awarded to British and Commonwealth forces.

== Biography ==
Educated at St Paul's School, London, and the Royal Military College, Sandhurst, in 1897 Watson was commissioned into the Green Howards and posted to the regiment's 2nd battalion, then serving in India. He took part in the Tirah Expedition of 1897–1898 on the North West Frontier, in which he was severely wounded, and saw action again in the Boxer Rebellion of 1900. He was promoted lieutenant in 1898 and after being invalided from India in 1903 he retired to the reserve of regular officers in 1904.

In 1909 he joined the County of London Yeomanry (Middlesex, Duke of Cambridge's Hussars). He was promoted Lieutenant in 1911, captain in 1913. He served in Gallipoli in April 1915 and was promoted to major in July 1915, before returning to the UK. Attached to the 2/5th King's Own Yorkshire Light Infantry from his Yeomanry unit in 1916, he went to France as the second-in-command in 1917. He was Mentioned in Despatches and awarded the DSO in May 1917, having been wounded at Bullecourt on 3 May 1917.

=== Victoria Cross ===
Watson was 41 years old, and an Acting Lieutenant-Colonel commanding the 5th Battalion, King's Own Yorkshire Light Infantry (now part of The Rifles) during the First World War when the following deed took place for which he was awarded the VC.

On 28 March 1918 at Rossignol Wood, north of Hebuterne, France, a counter-attack had been made against the enemy position which at first achieved its object, but as they were holding out in two improvised strong-points, Lieutenant Colonel Watson saw that immediate action was necessary and he led his remaining small reserve to the attack, organising bombing parties and leading attacks under intense fire. Outnumbered, he finally ordered his men to retire, remaining himself in a communication trench to cover the retirement. The assault he led was at a critical moment and without doubt saved the line, but he was killed covering the withdrawal.

Lieutenant Colonel Watson has no known grave. He is remembered at the CWGC Cemetery at Arras, France and listed under the Middlesex Hussars (Yeomanry); his parent unit.

In 1956, Watson's medals were loaned to the Green Howards Regimental Museum, then in 1992 were donated as a gift to the Regiment by the husband of Watson's niece, Mrs Catherine Whittuck. A copy of his Victoria Cross is displayed at the Green Howards Regimental Museum, Richmond, North Yorkshire.

== Bibliography ==
- Monuments to Courage (David Harvey, 1999)
- The Register of the Victoria Cross (This England, 1997)
- Gliddon, Gerald (2013) [2004]. Spring Offensive 1918. VCs of the First World War. Stroud, Gloucestershire: The History Press. ISBN 978-0-7524-8730-4.
