= 187th (2/3rd West Riding) Brigade =

Military unit

The 187th (2/3rd West Riding) Brigade was a formation of the Territorial Force of the British Army. It was assigned to the 62nd (2nd West Riding) Division and served on the Western Front during the First World War.

== Formation ==
- 2/4th Battalion, King's Own Yorkshire Light Infantry
- 2/5th Battalion, King's Own Yorkshire Light Infantry
- 2/4th Battalion, Yorks & Lancs Regiment
- 2/5th Battalion, Yorks & Lancs Regiment
- 208th Machine Gun Company, Machine Gun Corps
- 187th Trench Mortar Battery
