= Laurence Calvert =

English Victoria Cross recipient (1892–1964)

Laurence Calvert VC MM
- Born: 16 February 1892; Leeds, West Riding of Yorkshire
- Died: 6 July 1964 (aged 72); Dagenham, Essex
- Military career
- Allegiance: United Kingdom
- Branch: British Army
- Rank: Sergeant
- Units: The King's Own Yorkshire Light Infantry
- Conflicts: World War I
- Awards: Victoria Cross; Military Medal; Order of Leopold (with palm)

Laurence Calvert VC MM (16 February 1892 – 6 July 1964) was an English recipient of the Victoria Cross, the highest and most prestigious award for gallantry in the face of the enemy that can be awarded to British and Commonwealth forces.

Calvert was 26 years old, and a sergeant in the 5th Battalion, King's Own Yorkshire Light Infantry, British Army during the First World War when, on 12 September 1918 at Havrincourt, France, at the Battle of Havrincourt, the following deed took place for which he was awarded the VC. The full citation was published in a supplement to the London Gazette of 12 November 1918 (dated 15 November 1918):

War Office, 15th November, 1918.

His Majesty the KING has been graciously pleased to approve of the award of the Victoria Cross to the undermentioned Officers, Noncommissioned Officers and Men: —

[...]

No. 240194 Sgt. Laurence Calvert, M.M.. K.O.Y.L.I. (Conisbro').

For most conspicuous bravery and devotion to duty in attack when the success of the operation was rendered doubtful owing, to severe enfilade machine-gun fire. Alone and single-handed Sjt. Calvert, rushing forward against the machine-gun team, bayoneted three and shot four.

His valour and determination in capturing single-handed two machine guns and killing the crews thereof enabled the ultimate objective to be won. His personal gallantry inspired all ranks.

He was also awarded the Military Medal (MM), and the Belgian Order of Leopold (with palm), in the grade of Chevalier.

A high school owned by Cockburn MAT in Leeds was opened in 2021 and named after him due to him going to Cockburn School at the time of his pre adult years. The school is called Cockburn Laurence Calvert Academy.

== The Medal ==
His VC is on display in the Lord Ashcroft Gallery at the Imperial War Museum, London.
