= Battle of Havrincourt =

1918 battle of World War I

- Part of the Hundred Days Offensive of World War I
Date	12 September 1918
Location	Havrincourt, France 50°06′43″N 03°05′13″E
Result	British victory

Belligerents
British Empire: United Kingdom; New Zealand	German Empire

Commanders and leaders
(United Kingdom of Great Britain and Ireland) Julian Byng	(German Empire) Otto von Below

Strength
3 divisions	4 divisions

Casualties and losses
Unknown	Unknown

The Battle of Havrincourt was a World War I battle fought on 12 September 1918, involving the British Third Army (under the command of General Sir Julian Byng) against German troops, including those of the 3rd and 10th Corps, in the town of Havrincourt, France. Although these battles were relatively small achievements in light of what would follow it marked the first time that the Hindenburg Line was pierced.

== Background ==
The 2nd Division conducted preliminary operations for the battle. Three divisions of the Third Army attacked the village of Havrincourt: the 62nd Division, New Zealand Division and 37th Division. Defending Havrincourt were four German divisions, from the 3rd and 10th Corps. In the normal course of events, the 62nd Division would not have been there but they had been given the Havrincourt sector out of respect for their performance there in 1917, the 62nd (West Riding) Division took Havrincourt and the 37th took Trescourt.

== Description ==
Despite their numerical superiority and strong fortifications within the town, the Germans were unable to hold their position and by the day's end Havrincourt was in British hands. The victory was not particularly showy or impressive, but it highlighted a growing lack of fighting spirit among the German soldiers on the Western Front. While some took no notice of this small battle, others noted its significance – indeed, Byng himself saw it as a turning point of sorts;

"He reckons his most important day with the 3rd Army to have been the capture of Havrincourt by the 56th Division in September 1918. He supported it quickly with two other divisions, and the Boches threw two of the old Vionville divisions of their 3rd and 10th Corps, Brandenburgers and Hanoverians, against him with two more in reserve. They were well beaten, and the heart was out of the enemy afterwards." – as recounted by Colonel Charles à Court Repington.

== Aftermath ==
This victory encouraged Field Marshal Douglas Haig to approve an attack on Epéhy the following day, along with other operations to prepare for the assault on the Hindenburg Line.

Sergeant Laurence Calvert was awarded the Victoria Cross for his actions during the battle.

== Notes ==
1. – a mistake on the part either of Byng or of Repington, as it was actually the 62nd Division.
