= 186th (2/2nd West Riding) Brigade =

Military unit

The 186th (2/2nd West Riding) Brigade was a formation of the Territorial Force of the British Army. It was assigned to the 62nd (2nd West Riding) Division and served on the Western Front during the First World War.

== Formation ==
The infantry battalions did not all serve at once, but all were assigned to the brigade during the war.

- 2/4th Battalion, Duke of Wellington's Regiment
- 2/5th Battalion, Duke of Wellington's Regiment
- 2/6th Battalion, Duke of Wellington's Regiment
- 2/7th Battalion, Duke of Wellington's Regiment
- 2/4th Battalion, Hampshire Regiment
- 213th Machine Gun Company
- 186th Trench Mortar Battery
