= Rossignol Wood Cemetery =

World War I cemetery in Pas-de-Calais, France

Coordinates: 50.1296°N 2.6655°E

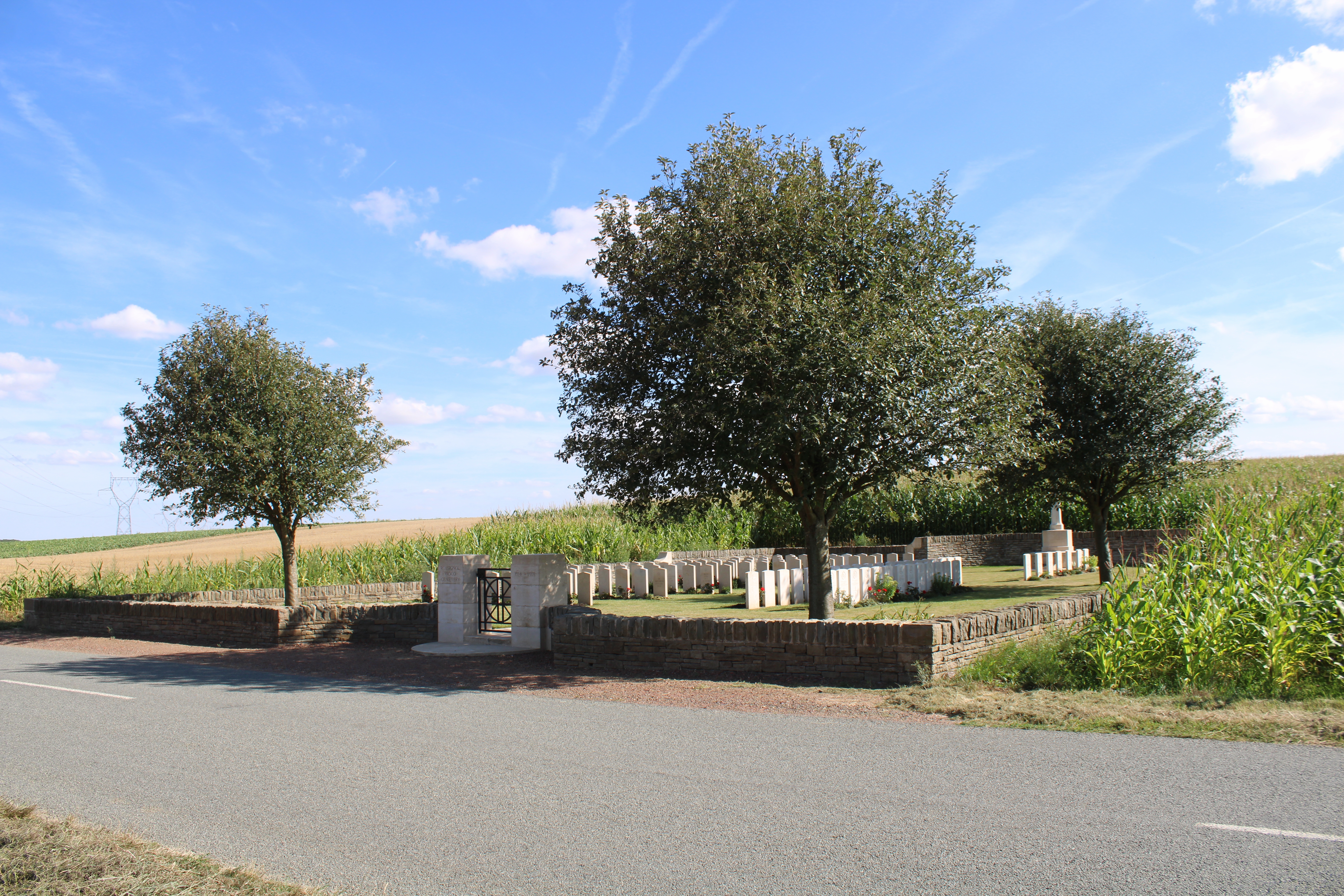
Rossignol Wood Cemetery

Rossignol Wood (French Bois de Rossignol, or "Nightingale Wood") is a forest northeast of Hébuterne, France. It is the site of a small World War I cemetery.

== Village ==
Bois de Rossignol is also a small village known for Le Petit Chancon, a small tavern rated in one undated Guide Michelin with three crossed spoons and forks, and one star. The tavern was mentioned in Gerald Durrell's story "The Michelin Man" in his autobiographical book The Picnic And Suchlike Pandemonium.
