= Wailly =

- Commune
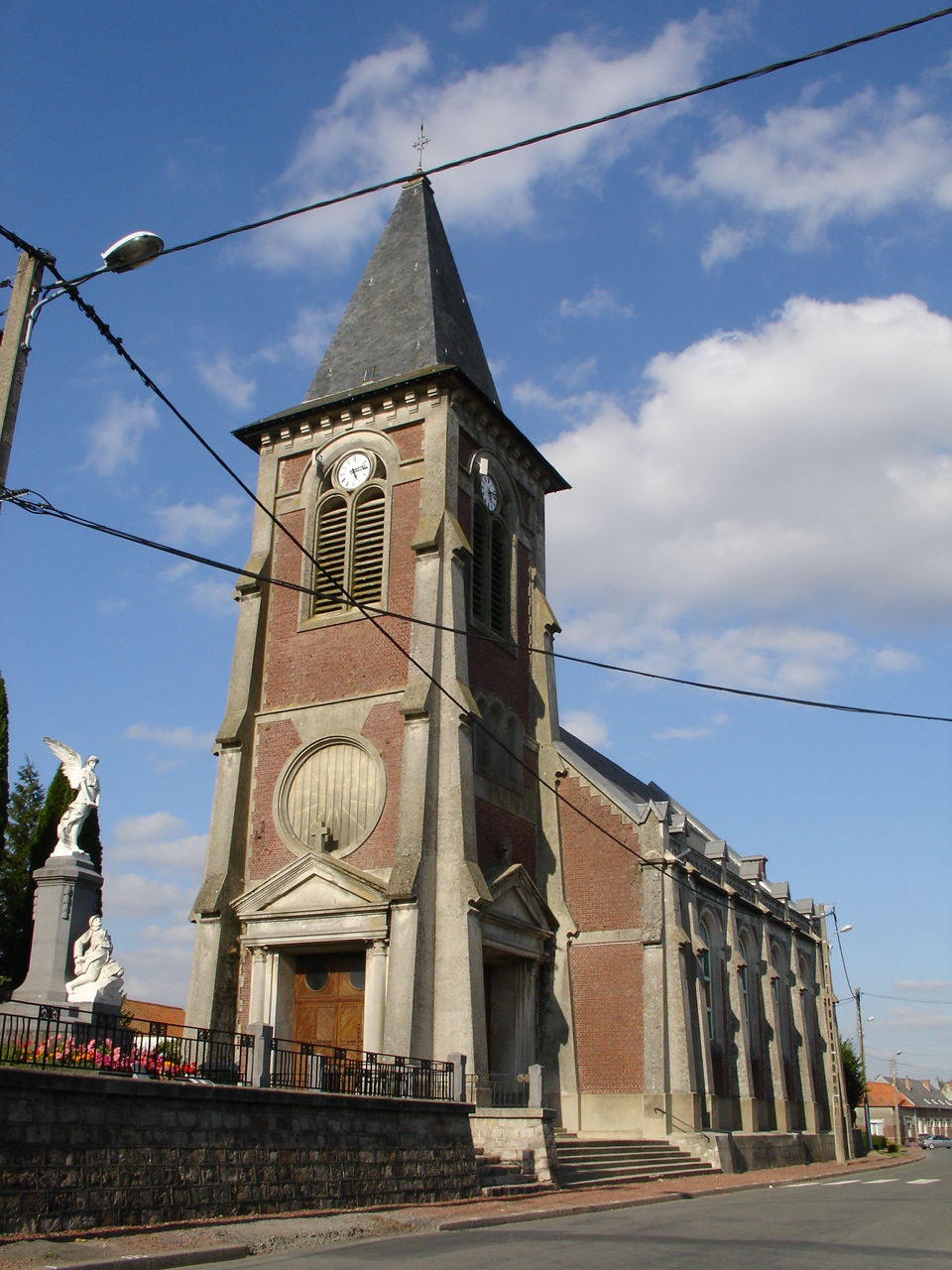
- The church of Wailly

- Coat of arms
- Location of Wailly
- Location within France Location within Hauts-de-France
- Coordinates: 50°14′50″N 2°43′24″E
- Country: France
- Region: Hauts-de-France
- Department: Pas-de-Calais
- Arrondissement: Arras
- Canton: Arras-1
- Intercommunality: CU Arras

Government
  - Mayor (2020–2026): Michaël Audegond
- Area^{1}: 9.83 km^{2} (3.80 sq mi)
- Elevation: 84 m (276 ft)
- Highest elevation: 111 m (364 ft)
- Lowest elevation: 68 m (223 ft)
- Population (2023): 1,062
  - Density: 108/km^{2} (280/sq mi)
- Time zone: UTC+01:00 (CET)
  - Summer (DST): UTC+02:00 (CEST)
- INSEE/Postal code: 62869 /62217
- ^{1} French Land Register data, which excludes lakes, ponds, glaciers > 1 km^{2} (0.386 sq mi or 247 acres) and river estuaries.

Wailly (French pronunciation: [waji]) is a commune in the Pas-de-Calais department in the Hauts-de-France region about 4 miles (6.4 km) southwest of Arras.

== Population ==
Historical population
Year	Pop.	±% p.a.
1968	567	—
1975	613	+1.12%
1982	811	+4.08%
1990	969	+2.25%
1999	971	+0.02%
2007	1,010	+0.49%
2012	1,062	+1.01%
2017	1,099	+0.69%
2023	1,062	−0.57%
Source: INSEE

== See also ==
- Communes of the Pas-de-Calais department
