= John Hemsley =

John Hemsley OBE GCStJ
- Born: 1935 (age 90–91)
- Alma mater: Royal Military Academy Sandhurst
- Military career
- Allegiance: United Kingdom
- Branch: British Army
- Service years: 1955–1987
- Rank: Brigadier
- Conflicts: The Troubles
- Awards: Mentioned in dispatches

Brigadier John Hemsley OBE GCStJ (born 1935) is a British writer and former Army officer and rally driver. Hemsley served as an officer in the Somerset Light Infantry and its successor regiments (the Somerset and Cornwall Light Infantry and The Light Infantry) from 1955. He spent a period on secondment to the King's African Rifles. Hemsley was mentioned in despatches for his service in Northern Ireland during The Troubles and went on to command a British Army of the Rhine brigade in West Germany. Originally a circuit racing driver in his spare time, he switched to rallying in 1963 and went on to compete in more than 50 events, including as leader of the British Army rally team. In 1983, Hemsley and his wife completed a record non-stop endurance drive from Cape Town to London, setting a new record that still stands for the only true overland route the whole way with no sea crossings (excepting the English Channel).

During his later years in the British Army, Hemsley wrote books on the command and control systems of the Soviet armed forces. Following his retirement, he became a research consultant and published further works in the field. Hemsley was also active in the St John Ambulance movement and has been appointed to the highest grade of the Most Venerable Order of the Hospital of St. John of Jerusalem.

== Military career ==
Hemsley was born in 1935. He attended the Royal Military Academy Sandhurst and, after passing out, was appointed a second lieutenant in the Somerset Light Infantry on 29 July 1955. Hemsley was promoted to lieutenant on 29 July 1957 and to captain on 29 July 1961, by which point the regiment was known as the Somerset and Cornwall Light Infantry, following a merger with the Duke of Cornwall's Light Infantry. At some point in the early 1960s, he served on secondment to the 3rd battalion of the King's African Rifles.

On 31 December 1967, Hemsley was promoted to major, the regiment had by then merged again, into The Light Infantry. He was promoted to lieutenant colonel on 30 June 1974 and was mentioned in despatches for service in Northern Ireland in autumn 1977, during The Troubles. He was promoted to colonel on 31 December 1979 and to brigadier on 31 December 1980 (though with seniority backdated to 30 June). During this time, he commanded a brigade in the British Army of the Rhine.

Hemsley was appointed to the ceremonial role of deputy colonel of the Light Infantry (Somerset and Cornwall) on 10 July 1982. He retired from the army on 2 April 1987 and relinquished his appointment as deputy colonel on 1 August. In retirement he lives on a farm near Bath, Somerset.

== Rallying ==
Hemsley was a circuit racing driver but switched to rallying in 1963 and went on to lead the British Army rally team. He competed in more than 50 events over the following twenty years.

=== 1983 Cape Town to London driving record ===
In 1983, Hemsley and his wife Lucy, who had recently gotten married, decided to attempt to break the overland driving record for Cape Town to London. Hemsley secured a Range Rover and sponsorship from Soda Stream. The pair made the attempt without any support vehicle and set off from Cape Town on 1 February, under the supervision of the Automobile Association of South Africa. Hemsley's route took him through East Africa where he illegally crossed the Tanzania-Kenya border, after being told he had to wait for the border official to arrive from his home with a passport stamp. In Sudan, the Hemsleys were shot at, after being mistaken for terrorists, and a bullet struck their front bumper. Hemsley completed the Cape Town to Cairo portion, some 6,934 miles (11,159 km), in a record time of 10 days 12 hours 15 minutes.

Hemsley's route through the Middle East took him via Israel, Jordan, Syria and Turkey. The Hemsleys became the first people to traverse the Allenby Bridge between Israel and Jordan in seven years. In Syria, they were detained by border officials, partly because they were suspicious of the lack of visa stamps in the Hemsleys' passports. Detained in prison, Hemsley found a cut off telephone cable in their cell and Lucy secured a telephone receiver by bribing local children with chocolate. After two-and-a-half hours of trial and error to connect the seven wires to the five terminals on the phone, they were able to make it work and called the British ambassador, Ivor Lucas. Lucas was at dinner but promised to secure their release in the morning. This was achieved and after a short delay while the air filters of their Range Rover, which had sat exposed to the elements, were cleared the rally resumed.

The Hemsleys achieved in excess of 80 miles per hour (130 km/h) across Europe, including refuelling stops, and arrived in London at 5:26 am on 16 February 1983, having set a record time for the journey of 14 days, 19 hours and 26 minutes. This was eight days quicker than the previous record, which had not been officially certified. The finish was supervised by the Royal Automobile Club and the overall time certified by them and the Guinness Book of World Records. The record was the first to have been completed almost entirely overland, with only the English Channel being crossed by ship; previous attempts had crossed the Mediterranean Sea. The Hemsleys' route covered 11,674 miles (18,787 km) (32.84mph including all stops), through 19 different countries and their time record still stands as the only complete overland route without a sea crossing.

== Writing and later life ==
Hemsley achieved a master of philosophy degree and is a fellow of the Royal Geographical Society and the Chartered Management Institute. Hemsley wrote on the military of the contemporary Soviet Union. His book Soviet command and control = (upravlenie voiskami) : an investigation of theory and practice was published in 1980 and Soviet troop control--the role of command technology in the Soviet military system in 1982. In retirement, he became a research consultant, specialising in Soviet military doctrine and command technology, with International Project Research. He continued to write and in 1987 published the book The Soviet biochemical threat to NATO, followed by The Lost empire : perceptions of Soviet policy shifts in the 1990s in 1990. In 1992, he wrote an article for the British Army Review journal on the role of technology in Russian military control theory.

In 1996, Hemsley appeared as an interviewee in a film on the history of the King's African Rifles. He has also served as vice president of the King's African Rifles & East African Forces Association. Hemsley organised a conference on the history of Wells Cathedral in September 2006 to mark the 800th anniversary of the election and enthronement of Bishop Jocelin.

Hemsley was active in the St John Ambulance movement and has served as chairman of the St. John Fellowship, its British "old comrades" organisation and runs tours to the Holy Land for its members. He was appointed an officer of the Most Venerable Order of the Hospital of St. John of Jerusalem on 20 November 1995, a commander on 7 February 2002 and a knight on 23 November 2004. He was appointed bailiff grand cross of the order on 5 May 2009. Hemsley was appointed an Officer of the Order of the British Empire in the 2009 New Year Honours for "voluntary service to the St. John Ambulance Brigade and to the community in Somerset".
