= Thomas Edward Rendle =

British soldier (1884–1946)

- Born: 14 December 1884; Bedminster, Bristol, England
- Died: 1 June 1946 (aged 61); Cape Town, South Africa
- Burial place: Maitland Road No 1 Cemetery, Cape Town
- Military career
- Allegiance: United Kingdom
- Branch: British Army
- Service years: 1902-20
- Rank: Sergeant
- Units: Duke of Cornwall's Light Infantry
- Conflicts: World War I
- Awards: Victoria Cross; Order of St. George 4th Class (Russia)

Sergeant Thomas Edward Rendle VC (14 December 1884 – 1 June 1946) was a British Army soldier and an English recipient of the Victoria Cross (VC), the highest and most prestigious award for gallantry in the face of the enemy that can be awarded to British and Commonwealth forces.

== Details ==
He was 29 years old, and a bandsman in the 1st Battalion, The Duke of Cornwall's Light Infantry, British Army during the First World War when the following deed took place for which he was awarded the VC.

On 20 November 1914 near Wulverghem, Belgium, Bandsman Rendle attended to the wounded under very heavy rifle and shell fire and rescued men from the trenches in which they had been buried from the blowing in of the parapets by the fire of the enemy's heavy howitzers.

== Later life ==
Rendle later achieved the rank of sergeant.

Rendle was a Freemason and was initiated into Needles Lodge No. 2838 on the Isle of Wight on 2 August 1916.

After the war, he emigrated to South Africa where he became bandmaster of the Duke of Edinburgh's Own Rifles.

== The medal ==
His VC is displayed at the Duke of Cornwall's Light Infantry Museum in Victoria Barracks, Bodmin, Cornwall.

== Bibliography ==
- Buzzell, Nora, ed. (1997). The Register of the Victoria Cross. Cheltenham, Gloucestershire: This England Alma House. ISBN 0-906324-27-0.
- Gliddon, Gerald (2011) [1994]. 1914. VCs of the First World War. Stroud, Gloucestershire: The History Press. ISBN 978-0752459080.
- Harvey, David (2000). Monuments to Courage. Naval & Military Press Ltd. ISBN 1-84342-356-1.
