= Light Infantry Brigade =

The Light Infantry Brigade was an administrative formation of the British Army from 1948 to 1968. The Brigade administered the regular English light infantry regiments.

After the Second World War the British Army had fourteen infantry depots, each bearing a letter. Infantry Depot J at Farnborough, Hants was the headquarters for the six English light infantry regiments.

In 1948, the depots adopted names and this depot became the Light Infantry Brigade, with all regiments being reduced to a single battalion at the same time. The Light Infantry Brigade was formed on 14 July 1948, combining the depots of the following regiments:

- The Somerset Light Infantry (Prince Albert's)
- The Duke of Cornwall's Light Infantry
- The Oxfordshire and Buckinghamshire Light Infantry
- The King's Own Yorkshire Light Infantry
- The King's Shropshire Light Infantry
- The Durham Light Infantry

Under the Defence Review announced in July, 1957, the infantry of the line was reorganised, and by 1959 the Brigade was reduced to four battalions:

- On 1 April 1958 the Oxfordshire and Buckinghamshire Light Infantry were transferred to the Green Jackets Brigade
- On 6 October 1959 the Somerset Light Infantry and the Duke of Cornwall's Light Infantry were amalgamated as the Somerset and Cornwall Light Infantry

From 1958 all regiments adopted a common brigade cap badge, a silver bugle-horn. From 1960 the Light Infantry Brigade was based at Copthorne Barracks in Shropshire.

On 1 July 1968 the Light Infantry Brigade was united with the Green Jackets Brigade, to form the Light Division. Nine days later, the four light infantry regiments were amalgamated into a single "large regiment" named The Light Infantry.
