= David Tyacke =

Major-General David Noel Hugh Tyacke CB OBE (18 November 1915 – 10 February 2010) was a senior British Army officer. His last post was as General Officer Commanding the Singapore District. He had previously been the last commanding officer of 1st Battalion, Duke of Cornwall's Light Infantry (DCLI) prior to its amalgamation into the Somerset and Cornwall Light Infantry.

== Early life ==
Tyacke was born and raised in Breage in Cornwall, where his family had been involved in tin mining since the early years of the 18th century. His father, Captain Charles Noel Walker Tyacke, served in the DCLI during the First World War, fighting at Ypres and Arras, before being killed near the Somme with the 5th Battalion in 1918. Tyacke's mother, Phoebe Mary Cicely Tyacke (née Coulthard), was then living at the vicarage in Breage.

Tyacke was educated at Malvern College (1929–33) and the Sandhurst Military College. He joined 2nd Battalion the Duke of Cornwall's Light Infantry in 1935, joining the 1st Battalion of his regiment in India in 1936.

== Second World War ==
At the start of the Second World War he was on leave in Britain, and joined the 2nd Battalion in France. Following a fighting retreat to Dunkirk, Tyacke led a small group to escape via the Bray-Dunes. The regiment reformed after Dunkirk at Sherborne, where Tyacke married Diana in June 1940.

After a period defending Selsey Bill during the Battle of Britain, and then at Southampton under Montgomery, in 1943 Major Tyacke was posted to Burma to serve under Orde Wingate.

Tyacke was attached to the Chindit staff for Operation Thursday, and was the last staff officer at Chindit HQ to see Wingate alive on 24 March 1944. After this, the Chindits were under the command of the US General Joseph Stilwell and Tyacke remained on the staff at Shaduzup in Burma until relieved by the 36th British Division.

== Post war ==
Tyacke worked for a time at the War Office, and then was Second in Command of the DCLI in the West Indies.

In 1957 he was promoted to command the regiment (by now back home in Bodmin), and took part in the celebrations of the centenary of the Defence of Lucknow, in which the DCLI's predecessor regiment, the 32nd Foot, had played a leading role.

Tyacke was promoted to major general in 1966, and appointed General Officer Commanding the Singapore District – covering an area stretching from Brunei to Bangkok.

== Retirement ==
Tyacke left the Army in 1970, but continued to work as the Controller of the Army Benevolent Fund. He was Colonel of The Light Infantry from 1972 to 1977, and a member of the council of his old school, Malvern College, from 1978 to 1988.

He died on 10 February 2010 at Winchester, where he had been living. His wife had predeceased him, and he was survived by their only son. Major General Tyacke was buried at Breage. His funeral was attended by about 120 people, including DCLI veterans and the Lord Lieutenant of Cornwall, Lady Mary Holborow.
