= General Crozier =

General Crozier may refer to:

- General Crozier (character), a fictional character in the animated television show Metalocalypse
- Baptist Crozier (1878–1957), British Army major general
- Frank Percy Crozier (1879–1937), British Army brigadier general
- William Crozier (artillerist) (1855–1942), U.S. Army major general and artillerist
