= New Bridge Street drill hall, Truro =

Military building in Truro, Cornwall, England

New Bridge Street drill hall
- Truro
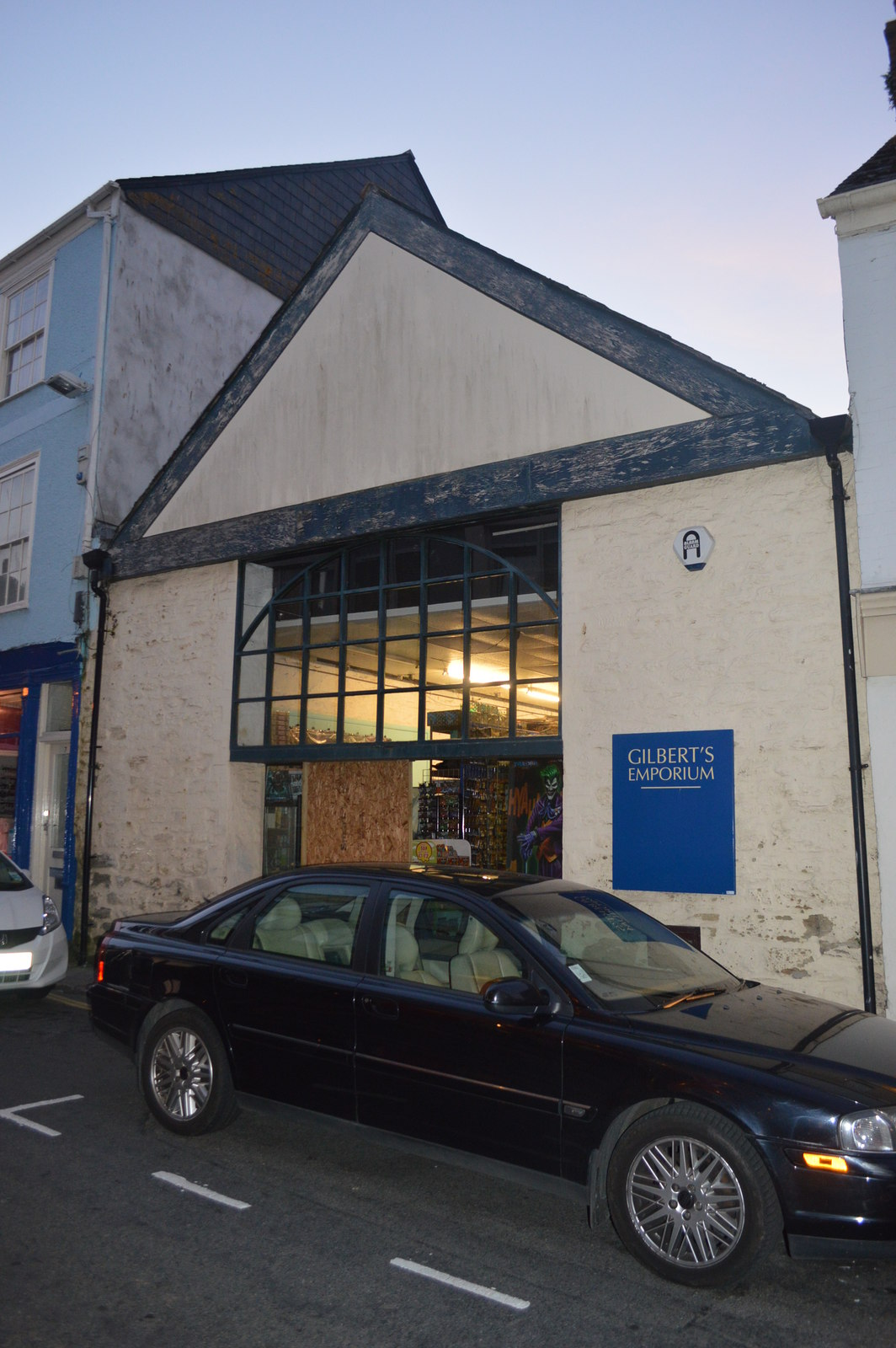
- New Bridge Street drill hall

Site information
- Type: Drill hall

Location
- Location in Cornwall
- Coordinates: 50.26361°N 5.04820°W

Site history
- Built: Late 19th century
- Built for: War Office
- In use: Late 19th century – 1960

The New Bridge Street drill hall is a former military installation in Truro, Cornwall.

== History ==
The building was designed as the headquarters of the 1st Volunteer Battalion, The Duke of Cornwall's Light Infantry and was completed in the late 19th century. The unit evolved to become the 4th Battalion, The Duke of Cornwall's Light Infantry in 1908. The battalion was mobilised at the drill hall in August 1914 before being deployed to India.

After the battalion amalgamated with the 5th Battalion to form the 4th/5th Battalion, The Duke of Cornwall's Light Infantry at Truro in 1921, the amalgamated unit moved to the Armoury in Pydar Street. The drill hall became surplus to requirements and was decommissioned and converted for retail use.
