= Honey Street drill hall, Bodmin =

Honey Street drill hall
- Bodmin
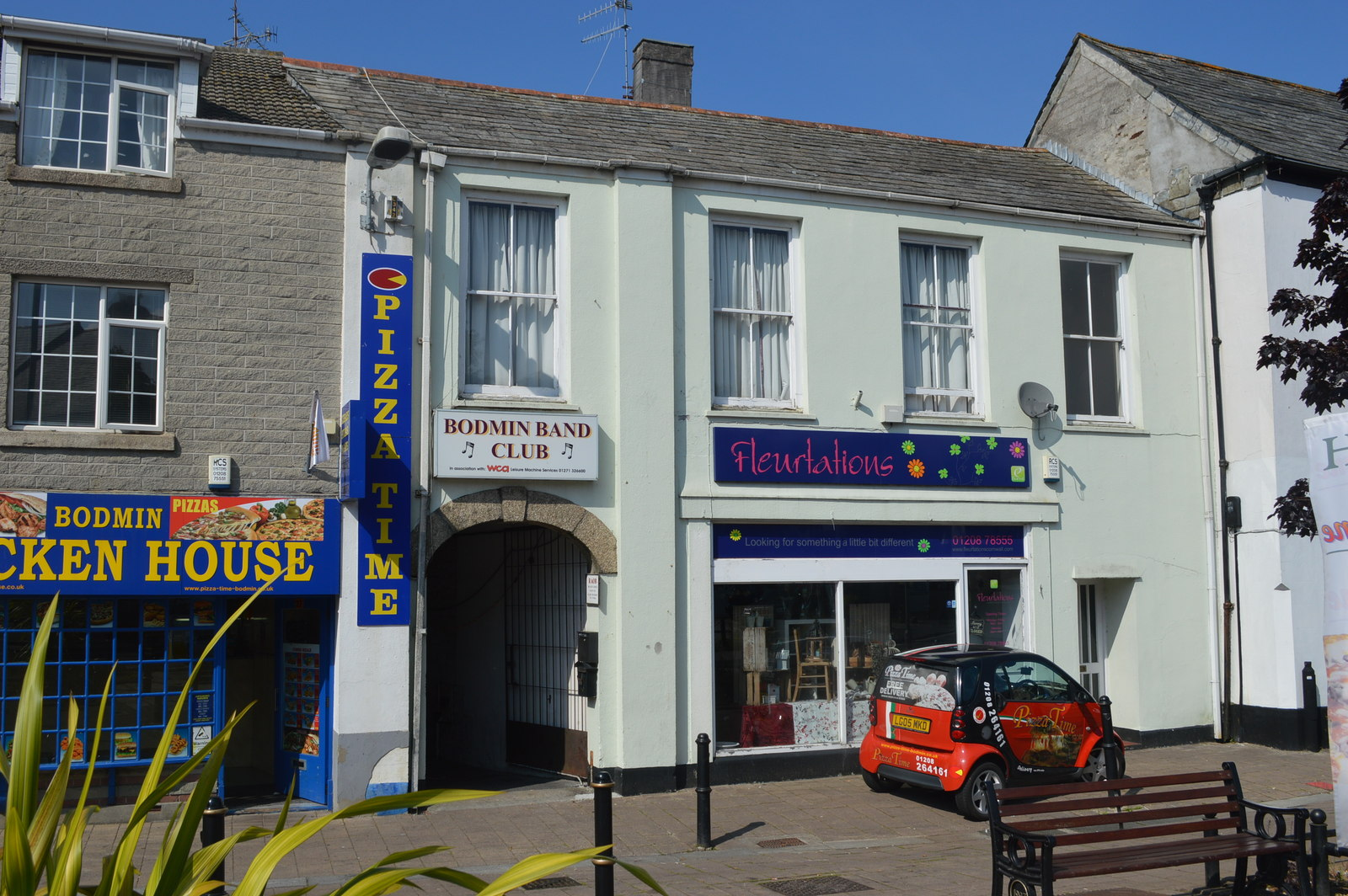
- Honey Street drill hall

Site information
- Type: Drill hall

Location
- Location in Cornwall
- Coordinates: 50.47151°N 4.71765°W

Site history
- Built: Late 19th century
- Built for: War Office
- In use: Late 19th century – Post Second World War

The Honey Street drill hall is a former military installation in Bodmin, Cornwall.

== History ==
The building was designed as the headquarters of the 2nd Volunteer Battalion, The Duke of Cornwall's Light Infantry and was probably completed in the late 19th century. The unit evolved to become the 5th Battalion, The Duke of Cornwall's Light Infantry in 1908. The battalion was mobilised at the drill hall in August 1914 before being deployed to the Western Front.

The battalion amalgamated with the 4th Battalion to form the 4th/5th Battalion, The Duke of Cornwall's Light Infantry at Truro in 1921. Although the two battalions operated separately during the Second World War, they amalgamated at Truro again in 1947. The presence in Bodmin was reduced to a single company, D Company, 4th/5th Battalion, The Duke of Cornwall's Light Infantry, at that time. After the contingent in Bodmin relocated to the Territorial Army Centre in Castle Canyke Road, the Honey Street drill hall became surplus to requirements; it was subsequently decommissioned and is now used as a social club.
