= Arthur Floyer-Acland =

British Army general

Lieutenant-General Arthur Floyer-Acland CB DSO MC DL
- Born: 7 September 1885; Dorset, England
- Died: 18 February 1980 (aged 94)
- Relatives: Stafford Floyer-Acland (son)
- Military career
- Allegiance: United Kingdom
- Branch: British Army
- Service years: 1905–1942
- Rank: Lieutenant-General
- Service number: 1920
- Units: Royal Warwickshire Regiment; Duke of Cornwall's Light Infantry
- Commands: 43rd (Wessex) Infantry Division; 3rd Infantry Brigade; 1st Battalion, Duke of Cornwall's Light Infantry
- Conflicts: First World War; Waziristan campaign Second World War
- Awards: Companion of the Order of the Bath; Distinguished Service Order; Military Cross; Mentioned in Despatches (7); Croix de Guerre (France)

Lieutenant-General Arthur Nugent Floyer-Acland, CB, DSO, MC, DL (7 September 1885 – 18 February 1980) was a senior officer of the British Army who served in both the First and Second World Wars. He was Military Secretary from 1940 to 1942. In later life, he was High Sheriff and Deputy Lieutenant of Dorset.

== Early life ==
Born Arthur Acland on 7 September 1885, he was the second son of John Edward Acland and his wife Norah Letitia, daughter of Henry Nugent Bankes. He was educated in Blundell's School, located in Tiverton, Devon. In 1928, he assumed by Royal Licence the additional surname Floyer to inherit the estates of George Floyer.

== Military career ==
Floyer-Acland entered the British Army in March 1905 when he was commissioned as a second lieutenant into the 5th (1st Warwickshire Militia) Battalion, Royal Warwickshire Regiment. In February 1907, he was awarded a Regular commission in the Duke of Cornwall's Light Infantry.

He fought in the First World War, which began in the summer of 1914, receiving the Military Cross in 1915. He was promoted to a brevet major in 1917, mentioned in dispatches seven times during the course of the war, and was awarded the Distinguished Service Order in 1918 and the French Croix de Guerre in 1920.

Floyer-Acland attended the Staff College, Camberley in 1921 and was breveted to lieutenant colonel in 1927. Four years later, he received the command of the 1st Battalion of his regiment and in 1934 became colonel, being then attached to the War Office. After two years he came in charge of the 3rd Infantry Brigade and took part in the Waziristan campaign until 1938. He was promoted major general later that year, and became General Officer Commanding (GOC) of the 43rd (Wessex) Infantry Division, a Territorial Army formation, until February 1940.

In 1940, Floyer-Acland was appointed Military Secretary. In the King's Birthday Honours that July he was appointed a Companion of the Order of the Bath. He was advanced to a lieutenant general in 1941, and retired from his post in the next year. Floyer-Acland was nominated High Sheriff of Dorset in 1953 and served as Deputy Lieutenant of that county from 1957.

== Family ==
On 6 December 1913, Floyer-Acland married Evelyn Stafford Still, daughter of Stafford Still. His wife died in 1973 and Floyer-Acland survived her until 1980. Their only son was Stafford Floyer-Acland.

== Bibliography ==
- Smart, Nick (2005). Biographical Dictionary of British Generals of the Second World War. Barnsley, South Yorkshire: Pen and Sword Books. ISBN 1844150496.

Military offices
Preceded by Baptist Crozier	GOC 43rd (Wessex) Infantry Division; 1938–1940	Succeeded by Arthur Percival
Preceded by Sir George Giffard	Military Secretary; 1940–1942	Succeeded by Sir Colville Wemyss
