= Duke of Cornwall's Light Infantry =

Light infantry regiment of the British Army

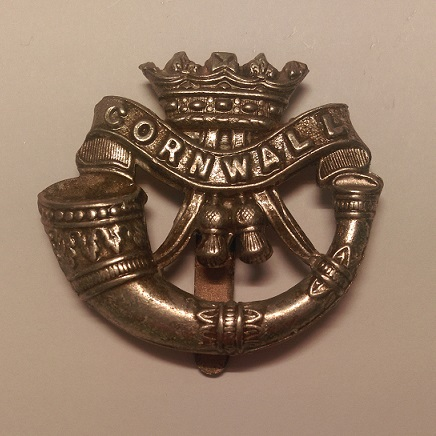
- Badge of the Duke of Cornwall's Light Infantry
- Active: 1 July 1881 – 5 October 1959
- Country: United Kingdom
- Branch: Army
- Type: Line infantry
- Role: Light infantry
- Size: 1–2 Regular battalions 1 militia and special reserve battalion 1–2 Territorial and volunteer battalions Up to 10 hostilities-only battalions
- Garrison/HQ: Victoria Barracks, Bodmin
- Facing colour: White
- March: Quick: One and All

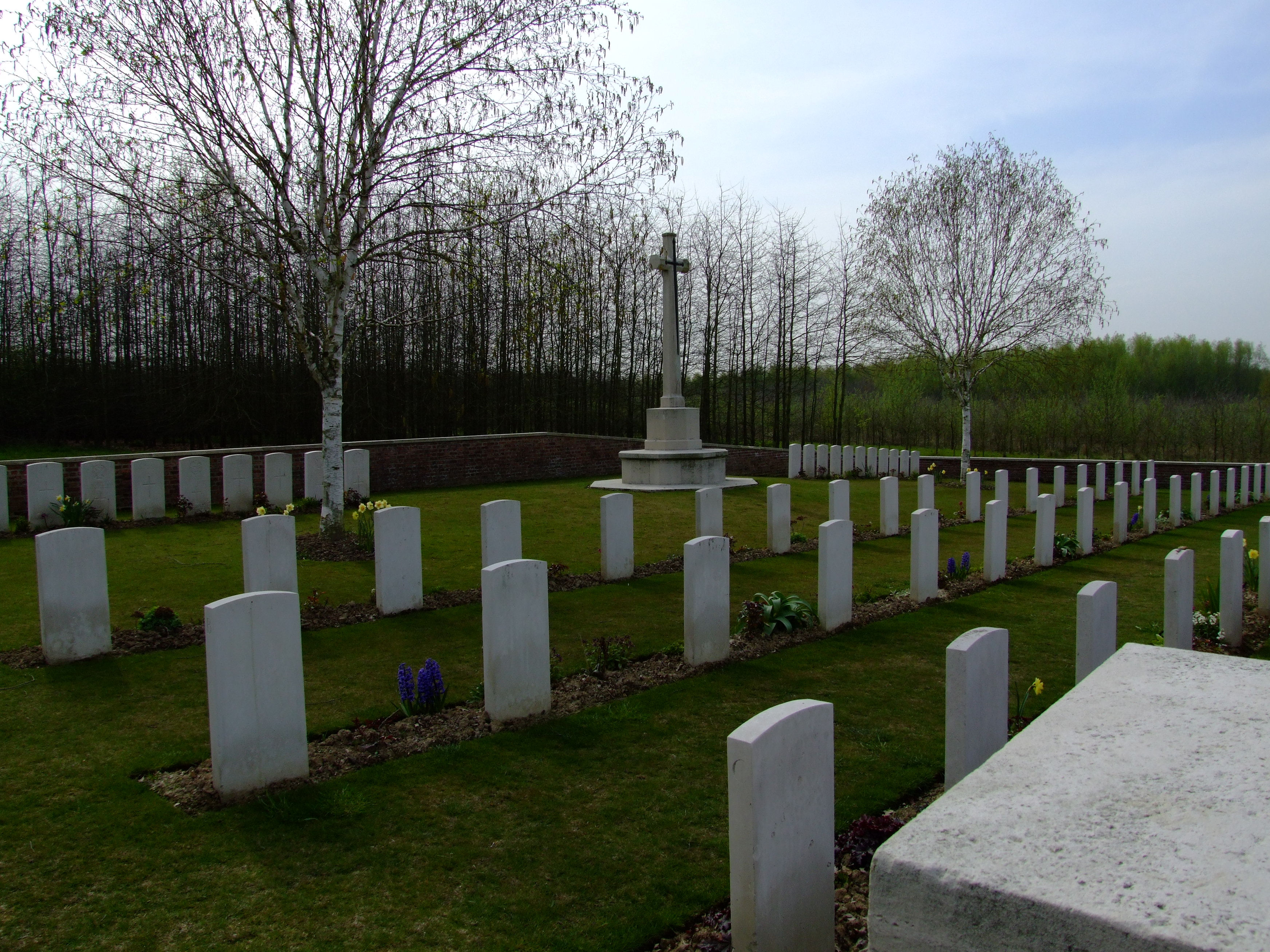
First DCLI Cemetery, The Bluff in Belgium

The Duke of Cornwall's Light Infantry (DCLI) was a light infantry regiment of the British Army in existence from 1881 to 1959.

The regiment was created on 1 July 1881 as part of the Childers Reforms, by the merger of the 32nd (Cornwall Light Infantry) Regiment of Foot and the 46th (South Devonshire) Regiment of Foot. The DCLI also incorporated the militia and rifle volunteers of Cornwall.

In 1959 the regiment merged with the Somerset Light Infantry (Prince Albert's) to form the Somerset and Cornwall Light Infantry. However, this was amalgamated with the Durham Light Infantry, the King's Shropshire Light Infantry and the King's Own Yorkshire Light Infantry to form The Light Infantry which was also merged, in 2007, with the Devonshire and Dorset Regiment, the Royal Gloucestershire, Berkshire and Wiltshire Regiment and the Royal Green Jackets to form The Rifles, which continues the lineage of the DCLI.

== History ==
The regiment was created on 1 July 1881 as part of the Childers Reforms, by the merger of the 32nd (Cornwall Light Infantry) Regiment of Foot and the 46th (South Devonshire) Regiment of Foot, which became respectively the 1st Battalion and the 2nd Battalion of The Duke of Cornwall's Light Infantry. The DCLI also incorporated the militia and rifle volunteers of Cornwall.

=== 1881–1899 ===
While stationed in Ulster in the 1890's, the Duke of Cornwall's Light Infantry competed in the Mid-Ulster Cup football competition. They reached the 1895 final, and beat Glenavon F.C. 5-0 at Gilford, County Down to win the cup.

Under the Childers system, one regular battalion of each regiment was to be at a "home" station, while the other was abroad. Every few years, there was to be an exchange of battalions. In the period from the regiment's formation to the outbreak of the Second Boer War the two regular battalions were stationed as follows:

Location of 1st Battalion (ex 32nd Foot)	Years	Location of 2nd Battalion (ex 46th Foot)	Years
England and Ireland	1881–1885	Gibraltar	1881–1882
England and Ireland	1881–1885	Egypt	1882–1885
Malta	1885–1888	Sudan	1885–1886
India and Burma (fought in Tirah Campaign of 1897)	1888–1900	England and Ireland	1886–1900

=== 1899–1914 ===
Lieutenant-General Sir F.W. Kitchener with 2nd Battalion Duke of Cornwall's Light Infantry at Prospect Camp, Bermuda in 1909

46th (South Devonshire) Regiment of Foot (1876–1879) & 2nd Battalion Duke of Cornwall's Light Infantry (1907–1910) graves in the Imperial Fortress colony of Bermuda

In October 1899 war broke out between the United Kingdom and the Boer Republics. The 2nd Battalion arrived in South Africa in the following month, where it took part in minor actions on the western border of the Cape Colony. In February 1900 it became part of the 19th Brigade. It saw action against the Boers at Paardeberg, and in March 1900 entered Bloemfontein. It continued to take part in a series of skirmishes until the end of the war. The 1st Battalion took no part in the war, moving from India to Ceylon in December 1900 where its soldiers guarded Boer prisoners of war.

Following the war in South Africa, the system of rotating battalions between home and foreign stations resumed as follows:

Location of 1st Battalion (ex 32nd Foot)	Years	Location of 2nd Battalion (ex 46th Foot)	Years
South Africa	1902–1906	England	1902–1905
England	1906–1913	Gibraltar	1905–1907
England	1906–1913	Bermuda	1907–1910
England	1906–1913	South Africa	1910–1913
Ireland (The Curragh)	1913–1914	Hong Kong	1913–1914

==== Reserve battalions 1881–1914 ====
The 1881 reorganisation also redesignated the militia and rifle volunteers of Cornwall as battalions of the regiment as follows:

- 3rd (Militia) Battalion (formerly the "Royal Cornwall Rangers, Duke of Cornwall's Own Rifles", raised 1760)
- 1st Volunteer Battalion (formerly 1st Cornwall Rifle Volunteer Corps, raised 1860)
- 2nd Volunteer Battalion (formerly 2nd Cornwall Rifle Volunteer Corps, raised 1860)

Neither militia nor volunteer battalions were liable for service outside the United Kingdom. However, in the Second Boer War, both volunteer battalions contributed "Active Service Companies" that reinforced the regular battalions, and were awarded the battle honour "South Africa 1900–1901".

In 1908 reserve forces were reorganised by the Territorial and Reserve Forces Act 1907 (the Haldane Reforms). The militia was renamed the "Special Reserve", with the duty of providing trained recruits in time of war. The volunteer battalions became part of the new Territorial Force, which was organised into 14 infantry divisions which were called upon to serve abroad. On 1 April 1908 the three reserve battalions were accordingly redesignated as the 3rd (Special Reserve) Battalion at the regimental depot, the 4th (Territorial Force) Battalion at New Bridge Street in Truro and the 5th (Territorial Force) Battalion at Honey Street in Bodmin.

=== First World War ===
Officers and non-commissioned officers of the 8th (Service) Battalion, Duke of Cornwall's Light Infantry.

The war saw a large expansion of the regiment. This was done in two ways: by the formation of duplicate units to the existing territorial battalions, and by the raising of wartime "new army" or "service" battalions. The following battalions of the DCLI saw active service in the conflict:

Battalion	Service
1st Battalion	Western Front 1914–1917; Italian Front 1917–1918; Western Front 1918
2nd Battalion	Western Front 1914–1915; Macedonian Front 1915–1918
1/4th Battalion	India 1914–1916; Aden 1916–1917; Egypt 1917–1918
2/4th Battalion	(Formed September 1914) India 1914–1918
1/5th Battalion	Remained in UK until 1916. Western Front 1916–1918
6th (Service) Battalion	(Formed August 1914) Western Front 1915–1918 (disbanded February 1918)
7th (Service) Battalion	(Formed September 1914) Western Front 1915–1918
8th (Service) Battalion	(Formed September 1914) Western Front 1915; Macedonian Front 1915–1918
10th (Service) Battalion (Cornwall Pioneers)	(Formed March 1915) Western Front 1916–1918

=== Inter-war period ===
Years	1st Battalion	Years	2nd Battalion
1919–1922	Ireland	1919–1920	India
1922–1939	India		
1922–1939	India	1920–1921	Iraq
1922–1939	India	1921–1922	Ireland
1922–1939	India	1922–1924	Germany (Army of occupation)
1922–1939	India	1924–1927	Guernsey
1922–1939	India	1927–1932	England
1922–1939	India	1932–1935	Gibraltar
1922–1939	India	1935–1939	England

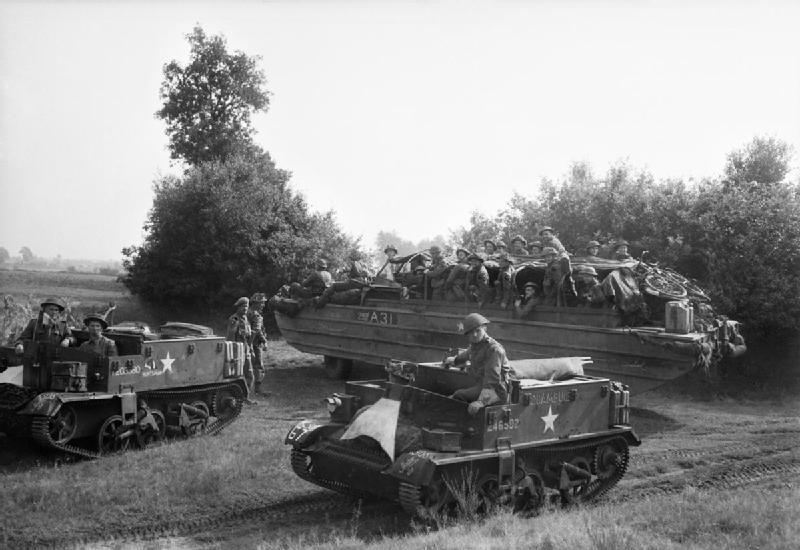
Members of the 5th Battalion during the Liberation of the Netherlands, September 1944

=== Second World War ===
During the war the regiment was increased to seven battalions. However, only the 1st, 2nd, 5th and the 7th (Home Service) Battalion, later to become the 30th, served overseas.

The 2nd Battalion, DCLI was serving in 10th Infantry Brigade, which also included the 2nd Bedfordshire and Hertfordshire Regiment and 1st Queen's Own Royal West Kent Regiment, part of the 4th Infantry Division, and was sent overseas to France shortly after the outbreak of war, where they arrived on 1 October 1939 as part of the British Expeditionary Force (BEF). The battalion remained in France for many months until May 1940 when the German Army invaded Holland, Belgium and France, where they, along with the rest of the BEF, were forced into a retreat to the Dunkirk perimeter where they were subsequently evacuated to England.

In July 1944, during the Battle of Hill 112 (Operation Jupiter), during the Battle for Caen, part of the larger Battle of Normandy, the hill acquired the name "Cornwall Hill" after Cornish soldiers of 5th Duke of Cornwall's Light Infantry, under Lieutenant Colonel John Pole, suffered 320 casualties there. The battalion was part of the 214th Infantry Brigade attached to the 43rd (Wessex) Infantry Division.

=== Post-war ===
The regiment reverted to two battalions following the war.

Between 1946 and 1954, the 1st Battalion served in Palestine, Cyprus, Somaliland, England, and the Federal Republic of Germany. The 2nd Battalion, between 1946 and 1948, served in Greece (including Eastern Macedonia). In 1948, it was reduced to a skeleton "representative cadre", before being amalgamated into the 1st Battalion in 1950.

In 1954, the 1st Battalion was posted to Jamaica, the last battalion to be posted to the West Indies for a full, three-year term. A Company detached on transit, posted to Prospect Camp, in the North Atlantic archipelago and Imperial fortress colony of Bermuda. The Bermuda Garrison no longer received a full regular army infantry battalion, as the part-time Bermuda Volunteer Rifle Corps (BVRC) (retitled Bermuda Rifles in 1949) and Bermuda Militia Artillery (BMA) had long-since taken on most of the responsibility for local defence. A Company was the last regular unit posted on garrison to Bermuda, with its departure constituting the withdrawal of the garrison from the one-time Fortress Bermuda. The officer commanding A Company, Major J. Anthony Marsh, DSO, a Second World War veteran of the Special Air Service, took permanent residence in Bermuda after leaving the regular army, retiring from military service in 1970 as a lieutenant-colonel, having commanded the Bermuda Militia Artillery and the Royal Bermuda Regiment (a 1965 amalgam of the BMA and the Bermuda Rifles). E Company also detached, being posted to British Honduras. In 1957, A and E companies reunited with the rest of the battalion in England, before being posted to Osnabrück in Germany, where it remained until 1959.

On the 6 October 1959, the Duke of Cornwall's Light Infantry merged with the Somerset Light Infantry to form the Somerset and Cornwall Light Infantry.

== Cornwall Rifle Volunteers ==
The 1st Administrative Battalion, Cornwall Rifle Volunteers was first formed in June 1860 consisting of 21 Rifle Volunteer Corps or "Companies" the last being raised in January 1861.

In 1947 after the Second World War and as part of the demobilization the 4th and 5th battalions merged to create the new 4th/5th Battalion. The battalion had the following structure upon formation:

- Headquarters - Truro
  - A Company - Penzance
  - B Company - Truro
  - C Company - Liskeard
  - D Company - Bodmin

In 1959 after the 1957 Defence White Paper the Duke of Cornwall's Light Infantry merged with the Somerset Light Infantry to form the new Somerset and Cornwall Light Infantry. In 1960 the battalion was renamed to "The Duke of Cornwwall's Light Infantry (TA)". In 1967 after the reforms to the 1966 Defence White Paper the battalion was disbanded and re-formed as a Territorial Battalion. The unit had the following:

- A (Cornwall) Company, Light Infantry Volunteers as part of TAVR II - Truro
- The Duke of Cornwall's Light Infantry Territorials as part of TAVR III - Truro
- A (Duke of Cornwall's Light Infantry) Company - Bodmin
- B (Cornwall Fortress Engineers) Company - Falmouth

In 1968 after further changes after the 1966 Defence White Paper all the unit was moved under control of the new larger regiment, The Light Infantry. Later on in 1971 the unit was re-formed and consisted of the following:

- A (Cornwall) Company, Light Infantry Volunteers - Truro
- C (Duke of Cornwall's Light Infantry) Company, 6th Battalion, The Light Infantry - Camborne
- D (Duke of Cornwall's Light Infantry) Company, 6th Battalion, The Light Infantry - Penzance

In 1972 the Light Infantry Volunteers were re-designated as the 5th Battalion, The Light Infantry. Later in 1988 the 6th Battalion of The Light Infantry was re-designated as the 6th (Somerset and Cornwall) Battalion, The Light Infantry. Finally when the Strategic Defence Review came the D (Cornwall Light Infantry) Company was re-formed as part of the new Rifle Volunteers. The company still exists as "D Company" within the 6th Battalion of The Rifles.

== Regimental museum ==
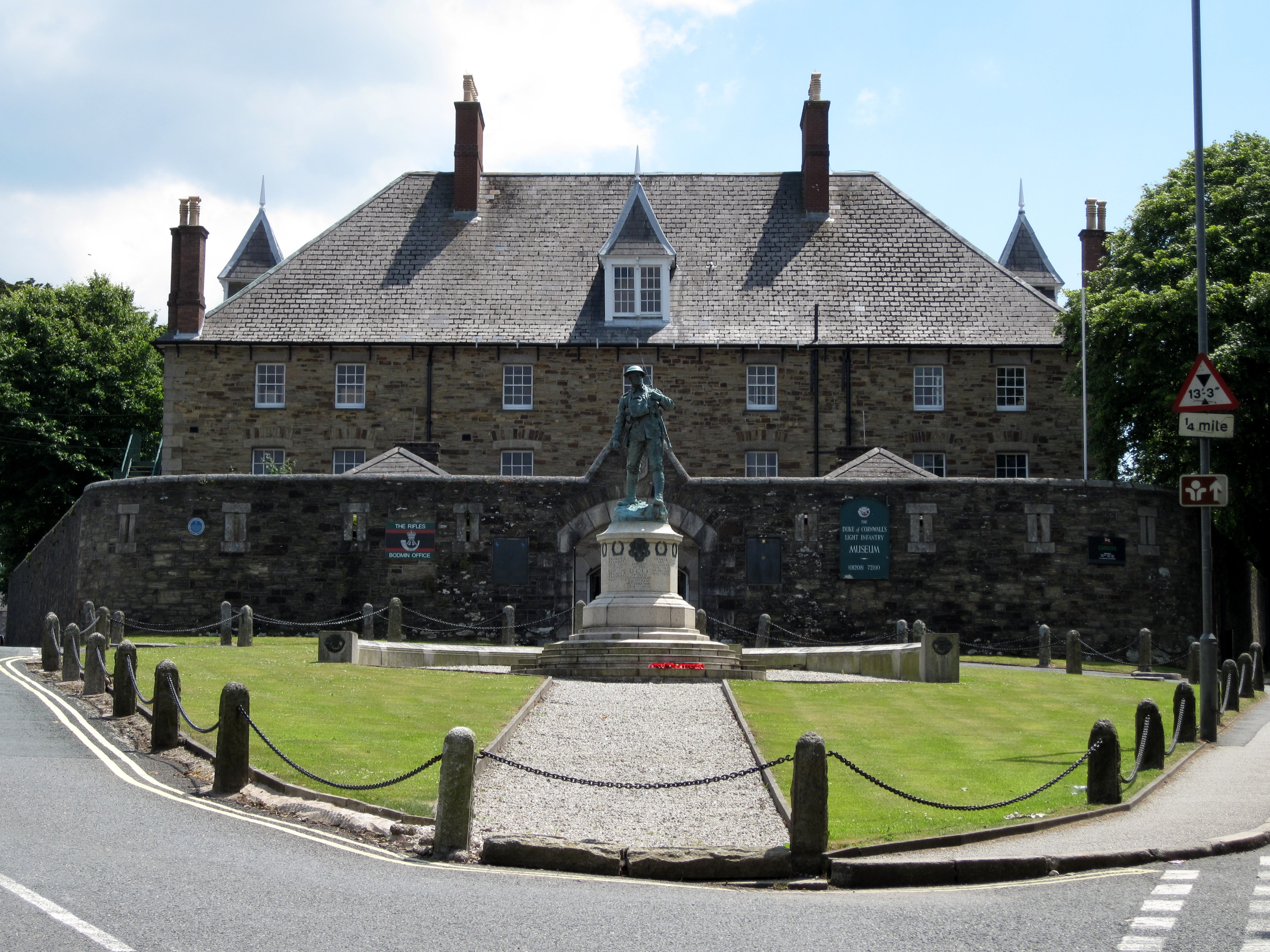
DCLI Regimental Museum

The Duke of Cornwall's Light Infantry regimental collections are displayed at Cornwall's Regimental Museum at Victoria Barracks in Bodmin. St Petroc's Church, Bodmin was the regimental place of worship where there are memorials to some of the servicemen and regimental colours from the past.

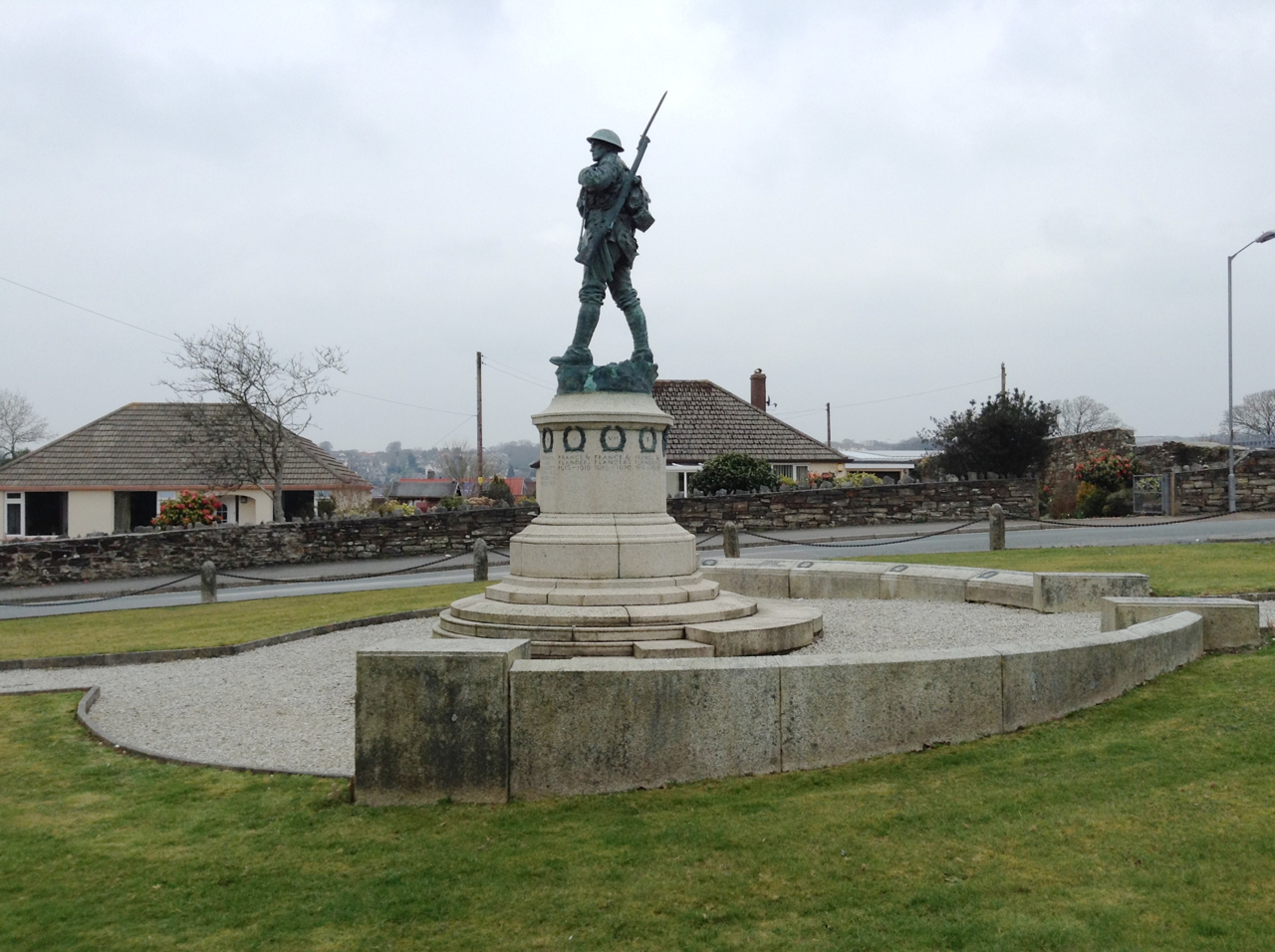
The war memorial

The regimental war memorial was erected here in 1924; it was the work of Leonard Stanford Merrifield and was in the form of a statue on pedestal and steps made from bronze and granite; it has been listed Grade II*.

== Literature ==
Surfing Tommies is a 2009 play by the Cornish author Alan M. Kent which follows the lives of three members of the Duke of Cornwall's Light Infantry on a journey from the mines of Cornwall to the fields of Flanders, where they learned to surf with South African troops.

In Barbara Taylor Bradford's best selling novel, A Woman of Substance (novel). Heroine Emma Hart’s first husband, Joe Lowther is a Private in the regiment, killed on the Somme.

== Notable members ==
Sergeant Thomas Edward Rendle, VC

=== Recipients of the Victoria Cross ===
Eight soldiers of the DCLI were awarded the VC including:

- Lieutenant Herbert Augustine Carter
- Lieutenant Philip Curtis (medal displayed in the Museum)
- Thomas Edward Rendle (medal displayed in the Museum)
- Clement Leslie Smith (medal displayed in the Museum)

=== Others ===
- Captain Piers Edgcumbe, 5th Earl of Mount Edgcumbe, served in the South African War
- Lieutenant-General Arthur Nugent Floyer-Acland CB, DSO, MC, DL (7 September 1885 – 18 February 1980)
- John Moore, a Major of the 32nd regiment who died at the Siege of Lucknow
- Harry Patch, a supercentenarian, the last Tommy, served on the Western Front of the Great War. (d. July 2009) Patch was the last male First World War veteran living in Europe and the last British male known to have been born in the 1890s.
- Harold Royffe
- Major-General David Tyacke (born 1915 at Breage, Cornwall; d. 2010); Colonel 1957–59 (afterwards deputy colonel of the Somerset and Cornwall Light Infantry)
- Sir David Willcocks CBE MC, choral conductor, organist, and composer, was formerly an officer in the regiment.
- Sir Arthur Quiller-Couch, the Cornish writer

== Battle honours ==
Battle honours of the regiment:

- From 32nd Regiment of Foot: Roliça, Vimiero, Corunna, Salamanca, Pyrenees, Nivelle, Nive, Orthes, Peninsula, Waterloo, Goojerat, Mooltan, Punjaub, Lucknow
- From 46th Regiment of Foot: Dominica, Sevastopol, Gibraltar 1704–05, Dettingen, St. Lucia 1778,
- Early wars: Tel el Kebir, Egypt 1882, Nile 1884–85, Paardeberg, South Africa 1899–1902,
- The Great War (15 battalions): Mons, Le Cateau, Retreat from Mons, Marne 1914, Aisne 1914, La Bassée 1914, Armentières 1914, Ypres 1915 '17, Gravenstafel, St. Julien, Frezenberg, Bellewaarde, Hooge 1915, Mount Sorrel, Somme 1916 '18, Delville Wood, Guillemont, Flers-Courcelette, Morval, Le Transloy, Ancre 1916, Bapaume 1917 '18, Arras 1917, Vimy 1917, Scarpe 1917, Arleux, Langemarck 1917, Menin Road, Polygon Wood, Broodseinde, Poelcappelle, Passchendaele, Cambrai 1917 '18, St. Quentin, Rosières, Lys, Estaires, Hazebrouck, Albert 1918, Hindenburg Line, Havrincourt, Canal du Nord, Selle, Sambre, France and Flanders 1914–18, Italy 1917–18, Struma, Doiran 1917 '18, Macedonia 1915–18, Gaza, Nebi Samwil, Jerusalem, Tell 'Asur, Megiddo, Sharon, Palestine 1917–18, Aden
- The Second World War: Defence of Escaut, Cheux, Hill 112, Mont Pincon, Noireau Crossing, Nederrijn, Opheusden, Geilenkirchen, Rhineland, Goch, Rhine, North-West Europe 1940 '44-45, Gazala, Medjez Plain, Si Abdallah, North Africa 1942–43, Cassino II, Trasimene Line, Advance to Florence, Incontro, Rimini Line, Italy 1944-45

== List of Colonels of the Regiment ==
Colonels of the regiment were as follows:

- 1881–1890 (1st Battalion): General Sir William Jones (ex 32nd Foot)
- 1881–1892 (2nd Battalion): General Charles Stuart (ex 46th Foot)
- 3 April 1890 (1st Battalion only to 1892): General John Thomas Hill
- 16 April 1902: Lieutenant-General Granville George Chetwynd Stapylton
- 28 April 1915: Lieutenant-General Reginald Pole-Carew
- 12 May 1923: Lieutenant-General Harold Bridgwood Walker
- 26 April 1932: Brigadier-General Martin Newman Turner
- 29 June 1935: General Walter Venning (retired 1942)
- 17 January 1947: General Sir Daril Watson
- 18 October 1953: Major-General Vyvyan Evelegh
- 27 August 1958: Major-General Robert Burrell Frederick Kinglake Goldsmith
- 1959: regiment amalgamated with The Somerset Light Infantry (Prince Albert's) to form The Somerset and Cornwall Light Infantry

== See also ==
- Duke of Cornwall's Light Infantry officers
- Duke of Cornwall's Light Infantry soldiers
- First DCLI Commonwealth War Graves Commission Cemetery, The Bluff
