= John William Ormsby =

English soldier

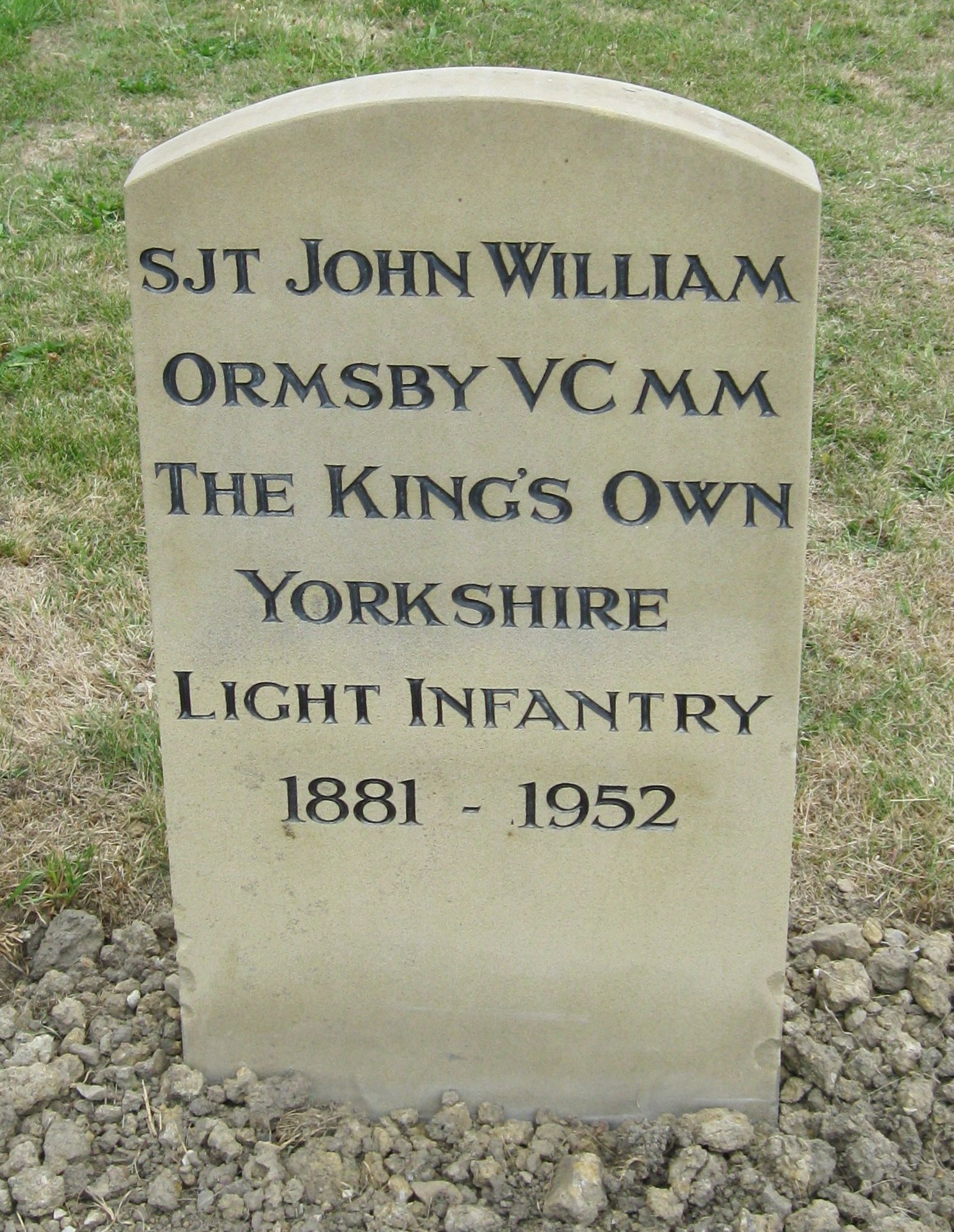
- Born: 11 January 1881; Dewsbury, West Yorkshire
- Died: 20 July 1952 (aged 71); Dewsbury
- Burial place: Dewsbury Cemetery
- Military career
- Allegiance: United Kingdom
- Branch: British Army
- Rank: Sergeant
- Units: The King's Own Yorkshire Light Infantry
- Conflicts: Second Boer War; World War I
- Awards: Victoria Cross; Military Medal

John William Ormsby VC MM (10 January 1881 – 20 July 1952) was an English recipient of the Victoria Cross, the highest and most prestigious award for gallantry in the face of the enemy that can be awarded to British and Commonwealth forces.

Ormsby was a career soldier first serving in the Second Boer War.

== Details ==
He was 36 years old, and a sergeant in the 2nd Battalion, The King's Own Yorkshire Light Infantry, British Army during the First World War when the following deed took place for which he was awarded the VC.

On 14 April 1917 at Fayet, France, during operations which culminated in the capture of an important position, Sergeant Ormsby, acting as company sergeant-major showed complete indifference to the heavy machine-gun and rifle fire and set a fine example. After clearing a village he pushed on and drove out many snipers from localities further forward. When the only surviving officer was wounded he took command of the company and led them forward under heavy fire for 400 yards to a new position, holding it until relieved.

== Medal ==
His Victoria Cross is displayed at the King's Own Yorkshire Light Infantry Museum, Doncaster, England.

== Bibliography ==
- Gliddon, Gerald (2012) [1998]. Arras and Messines 1917. VCs of the First World War. The History Press. ISBN 978-0-7524-6604-0.
- Whitworth, Alan (2012). Yorkshire VCs. Pen and Sword Books. ISBN 978-1-84884-778-1.
