= Surfing Tommies =

Surfing Tommies is a 2009 play by the Cornish author Alan M. Kent. It follows the lives of three members of the Duke of Cornwall's Light Infantry on a journey from the mines of Cornwall to the fields of Flanders, where they learn to surf from South African troops. It has been adapted as a radio play and was toured round Cornwall by Bish Bash Bosh Productions in 2009 and nationally in 2011.
