= Alan M. Kent =

Cornish poet and scholar (1967–2022)

Alan M. Kent (1967 – 20 July 2022) was a Cornish poet, dramatist, novelist, editor, academic and teacher. He was the author of a number of works on Cornish and Anglo-Cornish literature.

Kent was born in 1967 in St Austell, Cornwall and died after a short illness on 20 July 2022, aged 55.

== Plagiarism ==
In August 1997 The Times reported that poems by Kent had copied from the Scottish Gaelic language poet Derick Thomson. Kent had apparently copied a number of poems and just changed the names of places and people, locating them in Cornwall, instead of Scotland.

== Selected works ==
=== Academic work ===
- Kent, A. M., 1996, ‘“Art Thou of Cornish Crew?”: Shakespeare, Henry V and Cornish Identity’, in Payton, P., ed., Cornish Studies Four, Exeter: University of Exeter Press, pp. 7–25. ISBN 0859895238
- Kent, A. M., 1998, Wives, Mothers and Sisters: Feminism, Literature and Women Writers in Cornwall, Penzance: The Patten Press in association with The Hypatia Trust. ISBN 9781872229331
- Kent, A. M., 1999, ‘“At the Far End of England…”: Construction of Cornwall in Children’s Literature’, in Whetter, J. C. A., ed., An Baner Kernewek / The Cornish Banner, No. 98, Gorran Haven: Lyfrow Trelyspen Publications.
- Kent, A. M., 2000, The Literature of Cornwall: Continuity, Identity, Difference 1000-2000, Bristol: Redcliffe. ISBN 1900178281
- Kent, A. M., 2002, Pulp Methodism: The Lives and Literature of Silas, Joseph and Salome Hocking, St. Austell: Cornish Hillside Publications. ISBN 9781900147248
- Kent, A. M., 2002, ‘“In Some State…”: A Decade of the Literature and Literary Studies of Cornwall’, in Payton, P., ed., Cornish Studies Ten, Exeter: University of Exeter Press, pp 212–239. ISBN 0859897338
- Kent, A. M., 2003, ‘Screening Kernow: Authenticity, Heritage and the Representation of Cornwall in Film and Television’, 1913-2003, in Payton, P., ed., Cornish Studies Eleven, Exeter: University of Exeter Press, pp. 110–141. ISBN 0859897478
- Kent, A. M., 2004, ‘“Drill Cores”: A Newly-Found Manuscript of Cousin Jack Narratives from the Upper Peninsula of Michigan, USA’, in Payton P., ed., Cornish Studies Twelve, Exeter: University of Exeter Press, pp. 106–143. ISBN 0859897567
- Kent, A. M., 2004, ‘Song of Our Motherland’: Making Meaning of the Life and Work of Katherine Lee Jenner 1853-1936, in Williams, D. R., Henry and Katherine Jenner: A Celebration of Cornwall’s Culture, Language and Identity, London: Francis Boutle Publishers
- Kent, A. M., 2005, ‘Scatting it t’lerrups: Provisional Notes Towards Alternative Methodologies in Language and Literary Studies in Cornwall’, in Payton, P., ed., Cornish Studies Thirteen, Exeter: University of Exeter Press, pp. 23–52. ISBN 0859897710
- Kent, A. M., 2006, ‘“Bringin’ the Dunkey Down from the Carn”: Cornu-English in Context 1549-2005 – A Provisional Analysis’, in Tristram, H. L. C., The Celtic Englishes III: The Interface between English and the Celtic Languages, Potsdam: Potsdam University Press
- Kent, A. M., 2007, ‘“Mozeying on down…”: The Cornish Language in America’, in Tristram, H. L. C., The Celtic Englishes IV: The Interface between English and the Celtic Languages, Potsdam: Potsdam University Press. ISBN 9783939469063
- Kent, A. M., 2007, ‘Some ancientry that lingers: Dissent, difference and dialect in the Cornish and Cornu-English Literature of Robert Morton Nance’, in Thomas, P. W., and Williams, D., eds, Setting Cornwall on its Feet: Robert Morton Nance 1873-1959, London: Francis Boutle, pp. 98–152. ISBN 9781903427347
- Kent, A. M., 2007, ‘Alex Parks, Punks and Pipers: Towards a History of Popular Music in Cornwall 1967-2007’, in Payton P., ed., Cornish Studies Fifteen, Exeter: University of Exeter Press, pp. 209–247. ISBN 9780859898089
- Kent, A. M., 2009, ‘Mending the gap in the Medieval, Modern and Post-modern in New Cornish Studies: ‘Celtic’ materialism and the potential of presentism’, in Payton, P., Cornish Studies Twenty, Exeter, Exeter University Press, pp. 13–31. ISBN 9780859898744
- Kent, A. M., 2009, ‘A Sustainable Literature? Ecocriticism, Environment and a New Eden in Cornwall’s China-Clay Mining Region’, in Payton, P., Cornish Studies Seventeen, Exeter: Exeter University Press, pp. 51–79. ISBN 9780859898492
- Kent, A. M., 2010, The Theatre of Cornwall: Space, Place and Performance, Bristol, Redcliffe/Westcliffe Books. ISBN 9781904537991
- Kent, A. M., 2012, From Igraine Ingrained to Callin’ ‘ome Mouzel: Two Paradigms of Memory, Language and Literature in Cornwall, in Tregidga, G., Memory, Place and Identity: The Cultural Landscapes of Cornwall, London, Francis Boutle Publishers. ISBN 9781903427736
- Beard, A. & Kent, A. M., 2012, AQA English Literature B AS; 2nd ed., Cheltenham: Nelson Thornes Ltd. ISBN 9781408515334
- Kent, A. M. & Staunton, M,. 2013, Towards a Cornish Philosophy: Values, Thought, and Language for the West Britons in the Twenty-First Century, Cathair na Mart: Evertype. ISBN 9781782010456

=== Editorial work ===
- Kent, A. M. & Saunders T., eds. and trs., 2000, Looking at the Mermaid: A Reader in Cornish Literature 900-1900, London: Francis Boutle Publishers. ISBN 9781903427019
- Hale, A., Kent, A. M. & Saunders T. eds., 2000, Inside Merlin’s Cave: a Cornish Arthurian Reader, London: Francis Boutle Publishers. ISBN 978190342704 0
- Kent, A. M., ed., 2000, Voices from West Barbary: An Anthology of Anglo-Cornish Poetry, 1549-1928, London: Francis Boutle Publishers. ISBN 9780953238880
- Hurst, J., Kent, A. M. & Symons, A. C., eds., 2003, The Awakening: Poems Newly Found by Jack Clemo. London: Francis Boutle Publishers. ISBN 9781903427170
- Kent, A. M., ed., 2005, The Dreamt Sea: An Anthology of Anglo-Cornish Poetry 1928-2004. London: Francis Boutle Publishers. ISBN 9781903427224
- Kent, A. M. & McKinney G., eds., 2008, The Busy Earth: A Reader in Global Cornish Literature 1700-2000, St. Austell: Cornish Hillside Publications. ISBN 9781900147484
- Kent, A. M., ed., 2009, Charles Valentine Le Grice: Cornwall’s ‘Lost’ Romantic Poet, Selected Poems, St. Austell: Lyonesse Press. ISBN 9781898795155
- Kent, A. M. & Williams D. R., 2010, The Francis Boutle Book of Cornish Short Stories, London, Francis Boutle Publishers. ISBN 9781903427552
- Kent, A. M., ed., 2010, Four Modern Cornish Plays, London: Francis Boutle Publishers. ISBN 9781903427576
- Kent, A. M., ed., 2013, Charles Causley Theatre Works, London: Francis Boutle Publishers. ISBN 9781903427774

=== Other works on Cornwall and the Cornish ===
- Kent, A.M., 2004, Cousin Jack’s Mouth-Organ: Travels in Cornish America, St. Austell, Cornish Hillside Publications. ISBN 9781900147378
- Kent, A.M., Merrifield D.L.J., 2004, The Book of Probus: Cornwall’s Garden Parish, Tiverton, Halsgrove. ISBN 9781841143279
- Kent, A.M., Beare J., 2012, Celtic Cornwall: Penwith, West Cornwall & Scilly, Wellington, Halsgrove. ISBN 9780857040787

=== Creative writing - poetry ===
- Kent, A.M., 1994, Grunge, St Austell, Lyonesse Press. ISBN 9781898795001
- Kent, A.M., Hodge P., 1995, Out of the Ordinalia, St. Austell, Lyonesse Press. ISBN 9781898795018
- Kent, A.M., Hodge, P., Biscoe B,. 1995, Modern Cornish Poets/Berdh Arnowydh Kernewek, St. Austell, Lyonesse Press. ISBN 9781898795025
- Kent, A.M., 2002, The Hensbarrow Homilies, Penzance, The Hypatia Trust. ISBN 978-1872229447
- Kent, A.M., 2002, Love and Seaweed, St. Austell, Lyonesse Press. ISBN 9781898795117
- Kent, A.M., trs, 2005, Ordinalia: The Cornish Mystery Play Cycle – A Verse Translation, London, Francis Boutle Publishers. 978-1903427279
- Kent, A.M., 2005, Assassin of Grammar, Penzance, Hypatia Publications. ISBN 9781872229560
- Kent, A.M., 2006, Stannary Parliament, St. Austell, Lyonesse Press. ISBN 9781898795124
- Kent, A.M., 2008, Druid Offsetting, St. Austell, Lyonesse Press. ISBN 9781898795094
- Kent, A.M., 2010, The Hope of Place: Selected Poems in English 1990-2010. London, Francis Boutle Publishers. ISBN 9781903427637

=== Creative writing - plays ===
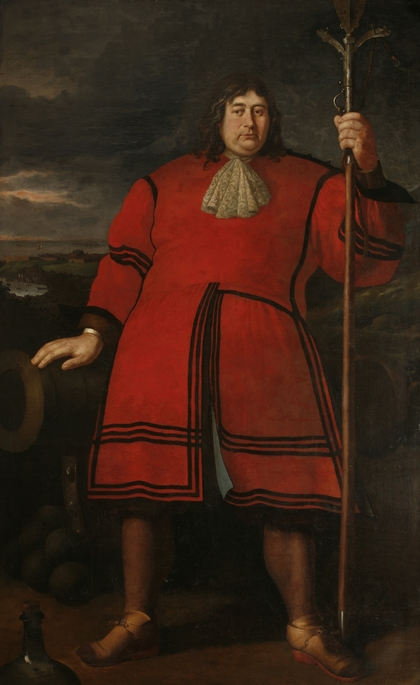
Anthony Payne is the subject of Alan M. Kent's play Oogly Es Sin.

- Kent, A.M., 2006, Nativitas Christi / The Nativity: A New Cornish Mystery Play, London, Francis Boutle Publishers. ISBN 9781903427316
- Kent, A.M., 2007, Oogly Es Sin: The Lamentable Ballad of Anthony Payne, Cornish Giant, London, Francis Boutle Publishers. ISBN 9781903427385
- Kent, A.M., 2008, 2012, The Tin Violin, The adventures of Joseph Emidy: A Cornish tale, London, Francis Boutle Publishers. ISBN 9781903427422
- Kent, A.M., 2009, Surfing Tommies: A Cornish Tragedy, London, Francis Boutle Publishers. ISBN 9781903427484
- Kent, A.M., 2010, A Mere Interlude, London, Francis Boutle Publishers. ISBN 9781903427569

=== Creative writing - novels ===
- Kent, A.M., 1991, Clay, Launceston, Amigo Books ISBN 1872416012
- Kent, A.M., 1996, Yowann and the Knot of Time, St. Austell, Lyonesse Press Ltd. ISBN 1898795037
- Kent, A.M., 2005, Proper Job, Charlie Curnow! Tiverton, Halsgrove. ISBN 9781841144887
- Kent, A.M., 2007, Electric Pastyland, Wellington, Halgrove. ISBN 9780955647727
- Kent, A.M., Williams N., tr., 2010, The Cult of Relics: Devocyon dhe Greryow, Cathair na Mart, Evertype. Hardback ISBN 9781904808411
- Kent, A.M., Williams N., tr., 2011, The Cult of Relics: Devocyon dhe Greryow, Cathair na Mart, Evertype. Paperback ISBN 9781904808794
- Kent, A.M., 2011, Voodoo Pilchard, Wellington, Halgrove. ISBN 9781906551278
- Kent, A.M., 2012, Voog’s Ocean, Wellington, Ryelands Publishing ISBN 9781906551353

=== Creative writing - children's literature ===
- Kent, A. M.; Cailes, G. & Kennedy, N. 2011, Beast of Bodmin Moor, Cathair na Mart: Evertype. ISBN 9781904808770
