= Baptist Crozier =

British Army general (1878–1957)

Major-General Baptist Crozier CMG DSO
- Born: 17 July 1878
- Died: 18 July 1957 (aged 81)
- Military career
- Allegiance: United Kingdom
- Branch: British Army
- Service years: 1898–1938
- Rank: Major-General
- Unit: Royal Artillery
- Commands: 43rd (Wessex) Infantry Division
- Conflicts: Second Boer War; First World War
- Awards: Companion of the Order of St Michael and St George; Distinguished Service Order

Major-General Baptist Barton Crozier, CMG, DSO (17 July 1878 – 18 July 1957) was a British Army officer.

== Military career ==
Crozier was commissioned into the Royal Artillery on 22 December 1898 and saw action during the Second Boer War and then the First World War. He fought at Givenchy on the Western Front, for which he was appointed a Companion of the Distinguished Service Order (DSO). The citation for his DSO appeared in The London Gazette in April 1915 and reads as follows:

Rendered valuable service in observing our artillery fire during the actions of 10th and 11th March, 1915, at Givenchy, whilst exposed to the enemy's heavy rifle fire and our own shrapnel. Has been conspicuous for gallantry and coolness under fire throughout the campaign.

He then saw action in Italy, for which he was appointed a Companion of the Order of St Michael and St George.

He went on to be Commander, Royal Artillery for Eastern Command in February 1929 and General Officer Commanding 43rd (Wessex) Infantry Division in October 1934, before retiring in December 1938.

Military offices
Preceded by Reginald Hildyard	GOC 43rd (Wessex) Infantry Division; 1934–1938	Succeeded by Arthur Floyer-Acland
