= Robert Goldsmith =

Major-General Robert Goldsmith CB CBE
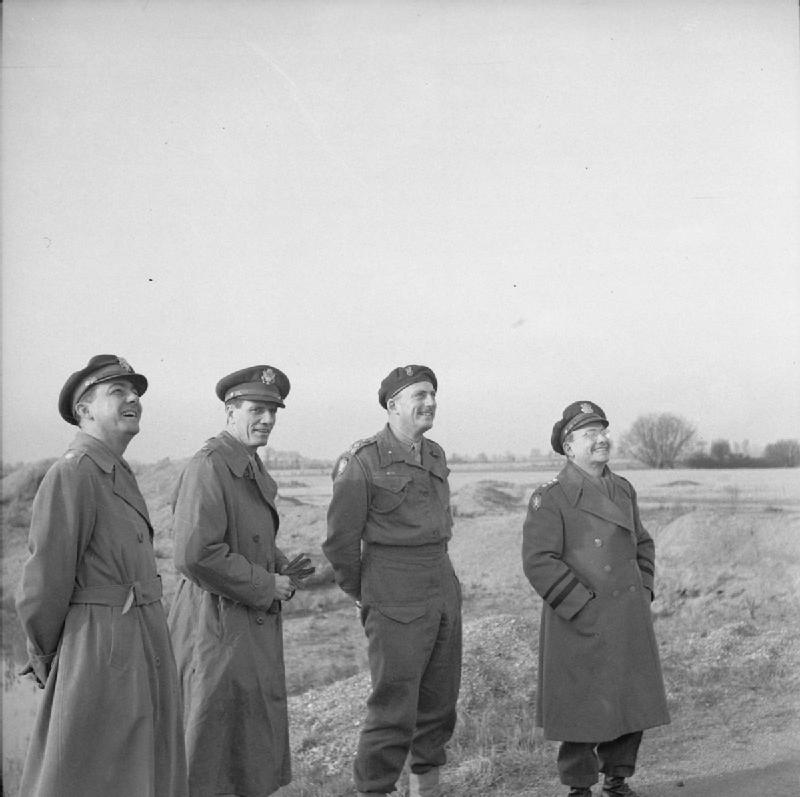
- Lieutenant General Lewis H. Brereton with Brigadier Robert Goldsmith and American officers of the Allied Air Staff watching a large scale exercise by the British 6th Airborne Division in the West Country
- Born: 21 June 1907; Kelston Lodge, Bath, Somerset, England
- Died: 7 April 1995 (aged 87)
- Military career
- Allegiance: United Kingdom
- Branch: British Army
- Service years: 1927−1962
- Rank: Major-General
- Service number: 38857
- Unit: Duke of Cornwall's Light Infantry
- Commands: 131st Infantry Brigade
- Conflicts: World War II
- Awards: Commander of the Order of the British Empire; Companion of the Order of the Bath

Major-General Robert Burrell Frederick Kinglake Goldsmith CB CBE (21 June 1907 – 7 April 1995) was a senior British Army officer who became colonel of the Duke of Cornwall's Light Infantry.

== Military career ==
Goldsmith was commissioned into the Duke of Cornwall's Light Infantry in 1927. He attended the Staff College, Camberley in the late 1930s.

He served in the Second World War as general staff officer (operations) for the Allied invasion of Sicily in June 1943 and for the Allied invasion of Italy in September 1943 before becoming Deputy Chief of Staff of the 1st Allied Airborne Army in 1944.

After the War he became commander of the 131 Infantry Brigade in 1950, Chief of Staff at Headquarters British Troops in Egypt in 1951 and Deputy Director of Personal Services in 1954. He went on to be Chief of Staff at Headquarters Western Command in 1956 and General Officer Commanding Catterick Area and Yorkshire District in 1959 before retiring in 1962.

He also served as colonel of the Duke of Cornwall's Light Infantry.
