= Herbert Augustine Carter =

Recipient of the Victoria Cross (1874–1916)

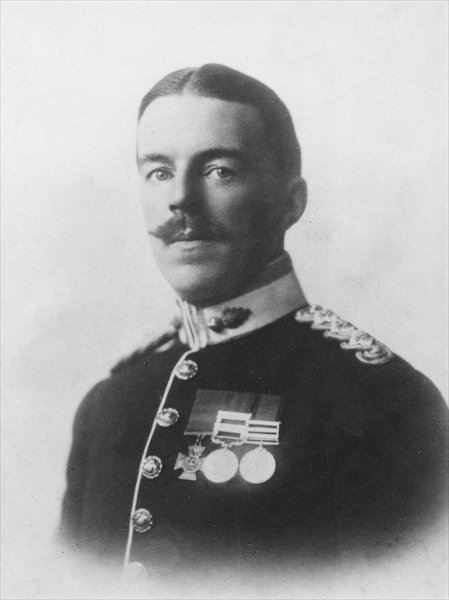
- Born: 26 May 1874; Exeter, Devon
- Died: 13 January 1916 (aged 41); Mwelo Mdogo, British East Africa
- Burial place: St Erth Churchyard, Cornwall
- Military career
- Allegiance: United Kingdom; British India
- Branch: British Army; British Indian Army
- Rank: Major
- Units: Duke of Cornwalls Light Infantry; Poona Mounted Infantry; 40th Pathans
- Conflicts: Tirah Campaign; Third Somaliland Expedition; World War I
- Awards: Victoria Cross

Major Herbert Augustine Carter VC (26 May 1874 – 13 January 1916) was an English recipient of the Victoria Cross, the highest and most prestigious award for gallantry in the face of the enemy that can be awarded to British and Commonwealth forces. He was the son of the vicar of St Erth in Cornwall and served in two campaigns in East Africa.

== Details ==
Carter was 29 years old, and a lieutenant in the Poona Mounted Infantry, Indian Army, during the Third Somaliland Expedition when the following deed took place for which he was awarded the VC.

On 19 December 1903 during a reconnaissance at Jidballi, British Somaliland, when two sections were retiring before a force of Dervishes who outnumbered them by thirty to one, Lieutenant Carter rode back alone, a distance of 400 yards, to the assistance of an Indian private who had lost his horse and was closely pursued by a number of the enemy. The man was so badly wounded that it took three attempts to get him on to the horse.

In a later incident he saved another soldier by shooting a lion with his last cartridge. In the Great War having been promoted major he arrived at Mombasa already ill with fever and then marched inland through barren country in intense heat but died from heat exhaustion in Mwelo Mdogo, British East Africa before his unit (the 40th Pathans) was able to engage the enemy forces.

He was an active freemason, and member of Kitchener No. 2998 E.C.

== Memorial ==
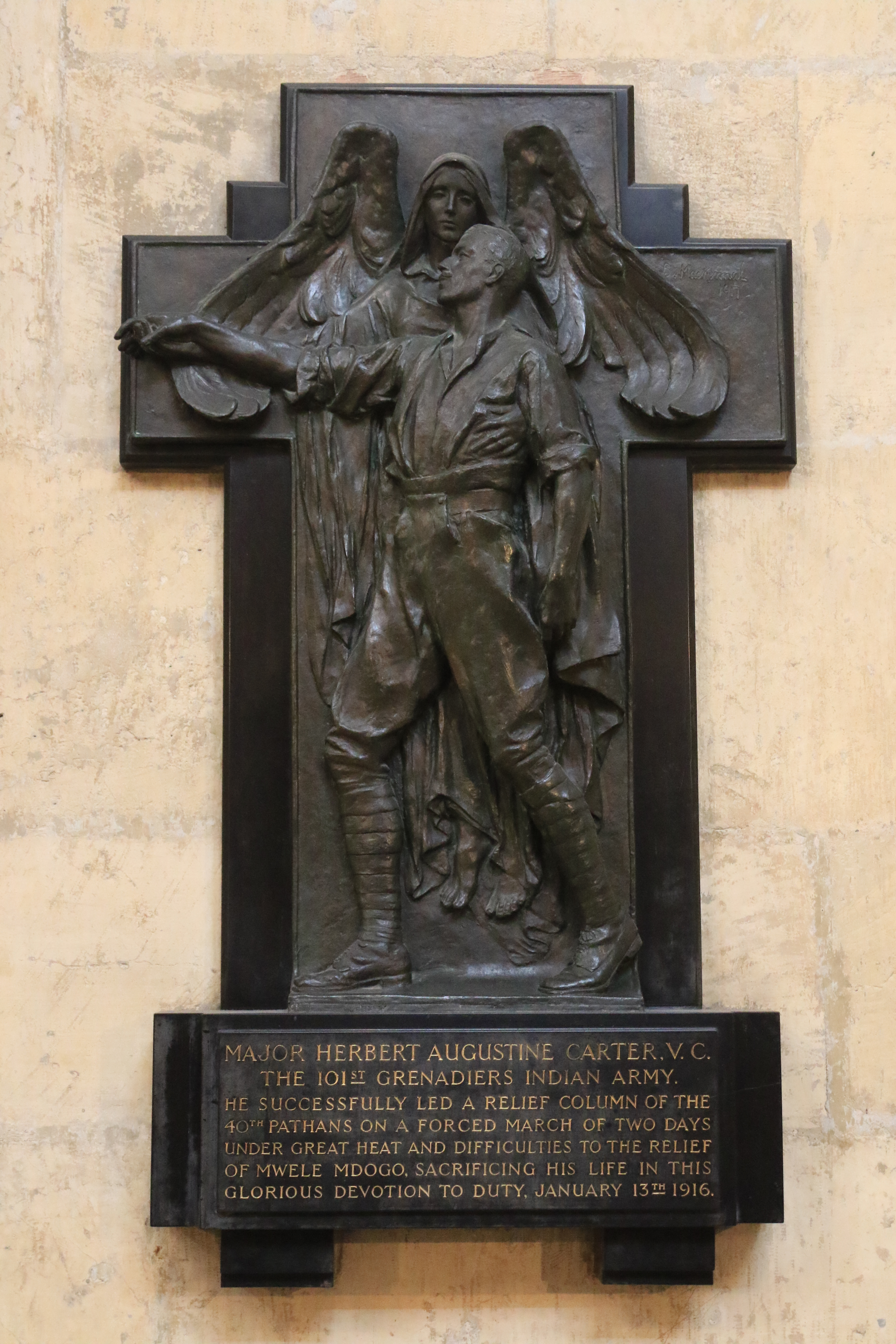
Memorial in York Minster

He is buried at St Erth in a plot planted with tropical plants including laurels and castor oil plants. Another memorial to his memory can be found in York Minster Made of black marble with bronze figures and designed by Sir Bertram Mackennal of Melbourne, Australia.

== The medal ==
His Victoria Cross is displayed at the Duke of Cornwall's Light Infantry Museum, Bodmin, Cornwall, England.
