= Somerset and Cornwall Light Infantry =

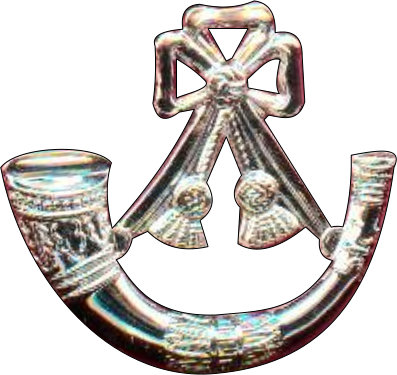
- Badge of the Somerset and Cornwall Light Infantry
- Active: 5 October 1959 – 1968
- Country: United Kingdom
- Branch: Army
- Type: Line Infantry
- Role: Light infantry
- Garrison/HQ: Victoria Barracks, Bodmin

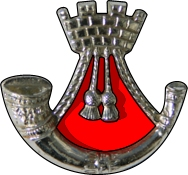
Somerset & Cornwall Light Infantry Right Collar dog

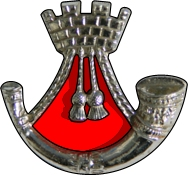
Somerset & Cornwall Light Infantry Left Collar dog

The Somerset and Cornwall Light Infantry (SCLI) was a light infantry regiment of the British Army. It was formed in October 1959 by the merger of the Somerset Light Infantry and the Duke of Cornwall's Light Infantry, and was itself merged with three other regiments of the Light Infantry Brigade in 1968 to form The Light Infantry.

== History ==
The regiment was formed in 1959 by the merger of two regiments: the Somerset Light Infantry and the Duke of Cornwall's Light Infantry. Immediately before amalgamation the 1st Battalions of these regiments were stationed at Warminster and Osnabrück, respectively. The 1st Battalion The Somerset and Cornwall Light Infantry served at Osnabrück until June 1961 as part of the BAOR, when it moved to Gibraltar. Gibraltar Day is now celebrated annually on 6 October as the Regimental Day of Somerset and Cornwall Light Infantry.

The regiment brought colours and insignia from its parent regiments: the Royal Blue Facings and Royal Bugle Cords of the Somerset Light Infantry, the red patch commemorating the red feathers of the Light Company of the 46th Foot (later the 2nd Battalion the Duke of Cornwall's Light Infantry) and the privilege of wearing the sash knotted on the right side, a unique distinction usually associated with the gallantry of the 13th Foot at Culloden. The green head-dress, whistle cord and No 1 Dress Uniform are common to all Light Infantry Regiments. The parent Regiments were raised: in 1685 as Huntingdon's Foot, in 1702, as Fox's Marines, and in 1740 as the 57th (later renumbered 46th) (1st and 2nd Battalions The Duke of Cornwall's Light Infantry).

Battalion strength at outset.
Header cell	Officers	Regular Soldiers	National Servicemen	Total
Former SOM LI	21	130	226	377
Former DCLI	28	147	155	330
1 SCLI	49	277	381	707

In 1968 it was amalgamated with the three other regiments of the Light Infantry Brigade to form The Light Infantry. Nicknames for the regiment included Pierce's Dragoons, The Bleeders, The Illustrious Garrison and The Yellow-banded Robbers.

== Postings ==
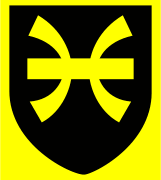
SCLI Osnabrück Formation Patch

The first posting of the newly formed regiment was to Osnabrück in Western Germany as part of the 12th Armoured Infantry Brigade. The first commanding officer of the regiment was Lt. Col. W.R. Lawson MBE, from October 1959 to April 1960. He was followed by Lt. Col. W. Hine-Haycock, who was in charge from April 1960 to September 1962. When this tour of duty ended, the battalion was moved to Seaton Barracks at Plymouth.

SCLI Gibraltar Formation Patch

The next posting was to Gibraltar where the battalion undertook ceremonial duties including the Ceremony of the Keys, mounting guard at the Governor's residence and at the Border crossing with Spain, which included a perimeter patrol. While at Gibraltar, the battalion provided a company strength contingent to garrison RAF El Adem at Tobruk.

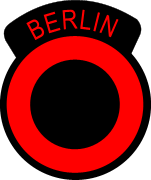
SCLI Berlin Formation Patch

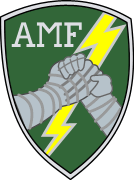
SCLI Gravesend Patch 1

The next posting took the regiment to Berlin between 1963 and 1965. During this period, Lt. Col. John Howard was in charge, followed by Lt. Col. G. Mathews. In November 1965 the regiment returned to Britain and was stationed at Milton Barracks, Gravesend. During this period, the battalion was part of the brigade force that was on permanent standby to be flown anywhere in the world at 72 hours' notice. This was probably part of 19th Airportable Brigade, which was based at Colchester and formed part of 3rd Airportable Division.

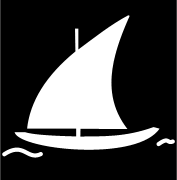
SCLI Aden Patch

In April 1966 the regiment was posted to Aden, a British protectorate, where extremists calling themselves the Aden National Liberation Front, battled for the independence of Aden by forcing the British out. During this posting, two servicemen were lost, one when his vehicle was blown up and the other when he was hit in the head by a piece of shrapnel from an exploding grenade.

== Battle honours ==
The Queens Colour

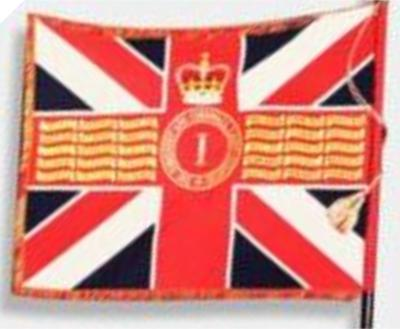
Queens Colours

- Mons – Marne, 1914, 18 – Aisne, 1914 – Ypres, 1915, 17, 18 – Somme, 1916, 18 – Albert, 1916, 18 – Arras, 1917, 18 – Passchendale – Cambrai, 1917, 18 – Hindenburg Line – Sambre – Doiran, 1917, 18 – Gaza – Palestine, 1917 – 18 – Tigris, 1916.
- Hill 112 – Mont Pincon – Nederrijn – Geilenkirchen – Rhineland – Rhine – North West Europe, 1940, 44–45 Gazala – Medjez Plain – Cassino II – Incontro – Cosina Canal Crossing – Italy, 1944–45 – North Arakan – Ngakyedauk Pass

The Regimental Colour

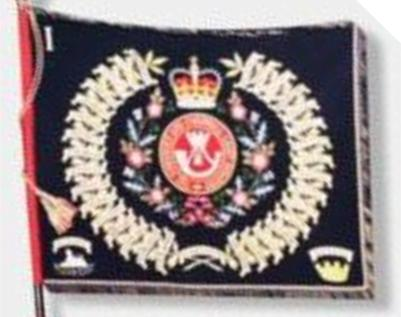
Regimental Colours

- A Bugle Horn stringed ensigned with a Mural Crown all in Silver. The Sphinx superscribed "Egypt". A Mural Crown superscribed "Jellalabad" Gibraltar, 1704–5 – Dettingen – St. Lucia, 1778 – Dominica – Rolica – Vimiera – Corunna – Martinique, 1809 – Salamanca – Pyrenees – Nivelle – Nive Orthes – Peninsula – Waterloo – Ava – Ghuznee, 1839 – Afghanistan, 1839 – Cabool, 1842 – Mooltan – Goojerat – Punjab – Sevastopol – Lucknow – South Africa – 1878-9 – Tel-el-Kebir – Egypt, 1882 – Nile, 1884–85 – Burma, 1885-87 – Paardeberg – Relief of Ladysmith – South Africa 1899–1902 – Afghanistan, 1919.

== Civic honours ==
- County Borough of Taunton – 29 June 1961
- City of Truro – 10 July 1961
- County Borough of Bodmin – 7 July 1961
- City of Bath – 13 July 1961
- City of Wells – 12 July 1961

== Notable members ==
Recipients of the British Empire Medal for Gallentry

One soldier of the SCLI was awarded the BEM:

Colour Sergeant Robert "Bobby" Bogan

== Regimental chapels ==
Church of St. Mary Magdalene, Taunton, Somerset

The South Aisle contains a Book of Remembrance in an oak desk of those who fell in the 1939–45 War, and memorials to those who fell in the 1914–18 War, The Boer War, Chitral, The Crimea, The Afghan Campaign, Maharajpore and the American War of Independence. St. Petroc's Church, Bodmin, Cornwall

The Regimental Chapel in the Soldiers' Aisle was dedicated on 13 August 1933. It contains memorials to those who fought in the Boer War and a Roll of Honour to those who fell in the 1939–45 War. It also contains all the old Colours of the 32nd and 46th Foot except the Waterloo Colours which are now in Dunstaffnage Castle, Argyllshire, having been given to Lieutenant Alexander Campbell in memory of his father, who was Colonel of the Regiment at that time. Collect

O GOD, FOR AS MUCH AS WE ARE ALL MEMBERS OF ONE BODY, AND WHEN SOME ARE HONOURED ALL REJOICE WITH THEM. GRANT TO US OF THE SOMERSET AND CORNWALL LIGHT INFANTRY THE SPIRIT OF UNITY AND BROTHERLY LOVE, THAT WE MAY ONE AND ALL LOVE AND SERVE THEE WITH ALL OUR HEARTS, REJOICING ABOVE ALL ELSE TO GIVE HONOUR TO THEE: THROUGH JESUS CHRIST OUR SAVIOUR, WHO LIVETH AND REIGHNETH WITH THEE AND THE HOLY SPIRIT, EVER ONE GOD, WORLD WITHOUT END .

== Regimental colonels ==
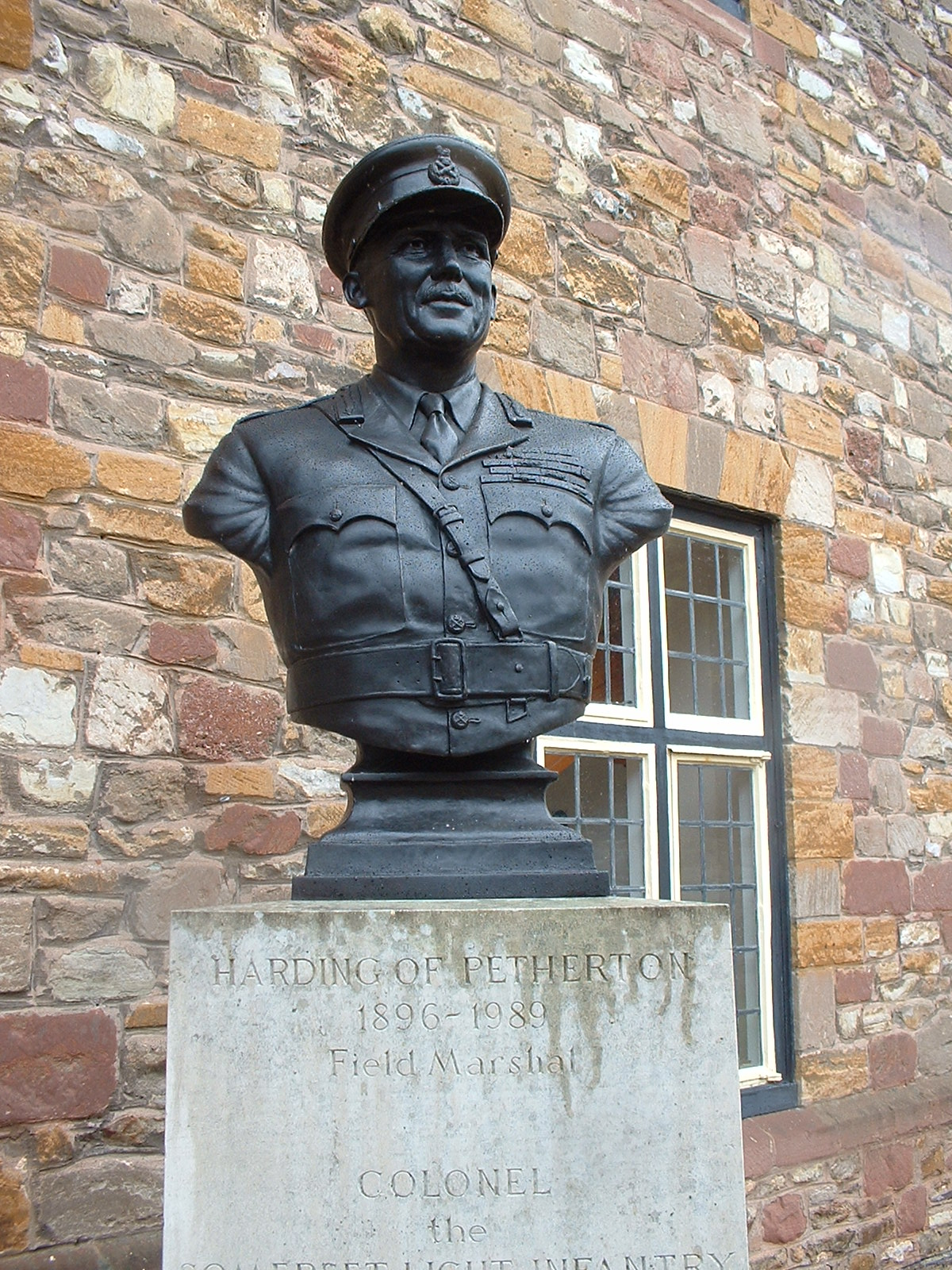
Baron Harding of Petherton

Colonels of the Regiment were:

- 1959–1960: F.M. The Rt Hon (Allan Francis) John Harding, 1st Baron Harding of Petherton, GCB, CBE, DSO, MC, KStJ (ex The Somerset Light Infantry (Prince Albert's))
- 1960–1963: Maj-Gen. Robert Burrell Frederick Kingslake Goldsmith, CB, CBE
- 1963–1968: Maj-Gen. Cecil Llewellyn Firbank, CB, CBE, DSO, DL
- 1968: Regiment amalgamated with The King's Own Yorkshire Light Infantry, The King's Shropshire Light Infantry and The Durham Light Infantry to form The Light Infantry
