= King's Own Yorkshire Light Infantry =

King's Own Light Infantry (South Yorkshire Regiment) King's Own (Yorkshire Light Infantry) King’s Own Yorkshire Light Infantry (51st and 105th)
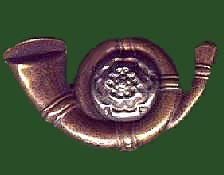
- The 'French' Horn and White Rose of the KOYLI
- Active: 1881–1968
- Country: United Kingdom
- Branch: British Army
- Type: Infantry
- Role: Light infantry
- Part of: Light Infantry Brigade (1948–68)
- Garrison/HQ: Pontefract Barracks, Pontefract, West Yorkshire
- Nickname: 'The Koylis'
- Patron: George IV (who conferred the 'Royal' title in 1821)
- Motto: Cede Nullis (Yield to none)
- Colors: Dark Green, Royal Blue and Off-White
- March: Quick: "Jockey to the Fair", Double: "The Keel Row", Slow: "Minden March"
- Anniversaries: Minden Day (1 August)
- Engagements: The Seven Years' War, The Peninsular War, Waterloo, The Boer War, World War I, World War II

Commanders
- Colonel-In-Chief: Queen Elizabeth The Queen Mother
- Colonel of the Regiment: Maj-Gen. C J Deedes OBE MC (1966–68)
- Notable commanders: Sir John Moore (1790–95)

The King's Own Yorkshire Light Infantry (KOYLI) was a light infantry regiment of the British Army. It officially existed from 1881 to 1968, but its predecessors go back to 1755. In 1968, the regiment was amalgamated with the Somerset and Cornwall Light Infantry, the King's Shropshire Light Infantry and the Durham Light Infantry to form The Light Infantry, which in turn was merged with the Devonshire and Dorset Regiment, the Royal Gloucestershire, Berkshire and Wiltshire Regiment and the Royal Green Jackets to become The Rifles in 2007.

== History ==
=== The 51st Foot ===
The 53rd Regiment of Foot was raised in Leeds in 1755 and renumbered the 51st in January 1757. In 1782, in common with other regiments of the line, the 51st was given a "county" designation, becoming the 51st (2nd Yorkshire, West Riding) Regiment of Foot. The title of Light Infantry was given in honour of its former commander General Sir John Moore in 1809, and in 1821 the regiment was given royal status when King's Own was added to its title, becoming the 51st (2nd Yorkshire, West Riding, The King's Own Light Infantry) Regiment.

=== The 105th Foot ===
The 2nd Madras European Light Infantry was raised by the East India Company in 1839. In 1861 East India Company forces were absorbed into the British Army, and the regiment became the 105th (Madras Light Infantry) Regiment. The 105th Regiment moved to Pontefract Barracks to co-locate with the 51st Regiment in 1879.

=== The King's Own Yorkshire Light Infantry ===
In 1881, after the Cardwell and Childers Reforms, regimental numbers were abolished. The 51st King's Own Light Infantry became the 1st Battalion, King's Own Light Infantry (South Yorkshire Regiment) and the 105th became its 2nd Battalion. The Childers Reforms also combined Militia and rifle volunteer units into the regiments formed in 1881. Accordingly, the 1st West Yorks Rifles Militia became the 3rd Militia Battalion, while the 3rd Administrative Battalion West Riding of Yorkshire Rifle Volunteer Corps became the 1st Volunteer Battalion. In 1897, the regimental title was changed to the King's Own (Yorkshire Light Infantry).

The 1st battalion was stationed at Limerick from 1899 until they in September 1902 transferred to Aldershot.

The 2nd battalion (105th) was stationed at Malta in 1884, moved to British India in 1887, then to Mauritius in February 1899. Following the outbreak of the Second Boer War in October 1899, the battalion transferred to South Africa, where it fought at the Battle of Modder River in November 1899. The battalion stayed in South Africa throughout the war, which ended in June 1902 with the Peace of Vereeniging. In October that year 790 officers and men of the battalion left Point Natal on the SS Staffordshire bound for Malta, where they were then stationed.

During 1912, one battalion of the regiment was stationed in Hong Kong. On 15 March 1912, a ceremony was held for the departure from the colony of the governor, Sir Frederick Lugard and it was reported that a guard of honour and a military band was provided by men of the King's Own Yorkshire Light Infantry. The regiment was on parade opposite Blake Pier.

With the creation of the Territorial Force in 1908, the 1st Volunteer Battalion was reorganised as the 4th Battalion at Bank Street in Wakefield (since demolished) and a 5th Battalion was also raised at Frenchgate in Doncaster (since demolished), while the 3rd Battalion was transferred to the Special Reserve.

=== First World War ===
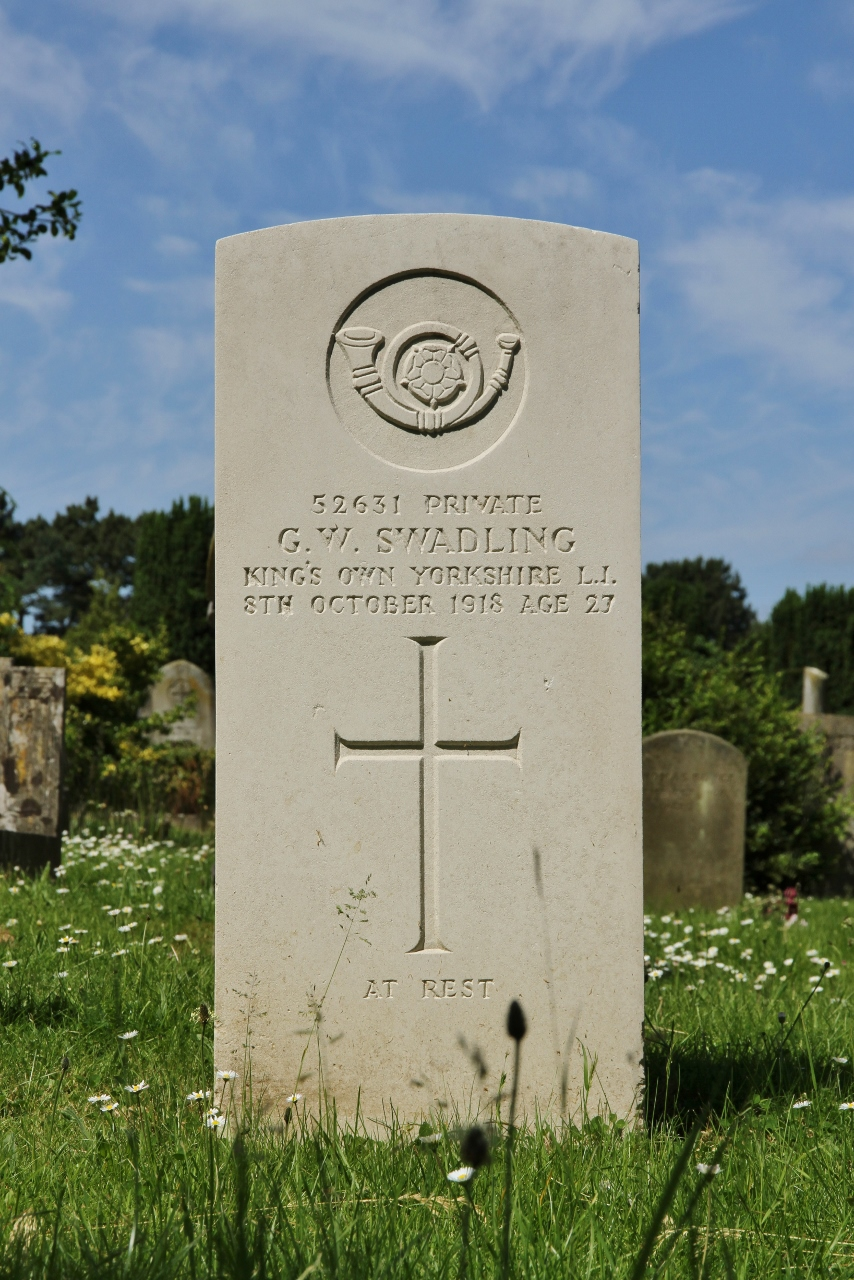
CWGC headstone in Rose Hill Cemetery, Cowley, Oxfordshire of a KOYLI private who died a month before the Armistice

==== Regular Army ====
The 1st Battalion landed at Le Havre as part of the 83rd Brigade in the 28th Division in January 1915 for service on the Western Front; it moved to Salonika in October 1915 and then landed at Taranto in Italy in July 1918. The 2nd Battalion landed at Le Havre as part of the 13th Brigade in the 5th Division in August 1914 also for service on the Western Front; the 2nd Battalion saw action at the Battle of Le Cateau later that month when it took some 600 casualties.

==== Territorial Force ====
The 1/4th and 1/5th Battalions landed at Boulogne-sur-Mer as part of the 3rd West Riding Brigade in the West Riding Division in April 1915 for service on the Western Front. The 2/4th and 2/5th Battalions landed at Le Havre as part of the 187th Brigade in the 62nd (2nd West Riding) Division in January 1917 also for service on the Western Front. Lt-Col Oliver Watson commanding 5th KOYLI was awarded the Victoria Cross (VC) posthumously for his actions at Rossignol Wood on 27 March 1918, and Sergeant Laurence Calvert of the same battalion was awarded the VC for actions at the Battle of Havrincourt (2 September 1918). Corporal Ernest Hayes, who was awarded three Military Medals in 1918 for acts of bravery on the Western Front, served with the 2/4th Battalion.

==== New Armies ====
The 6th (Service) Battalion landed at Boulogne-sur-Mer as part of the 43rd Brigade in the 14th (Light) Division in May 1915 for service on the Western Front. Captain B. H. Liddell Hart, who went on to be prolific military writer, served with the 6th Battalion. The 7th (Service) Battalion landed at Boulogne-sur-Mer as part of the 61st Brigade in the 20th (Light) Division in July 1915 also for service on the Western Front. The 8th (Service) Battalion landed at Boulogne-sur-Mer as part of the 70th Brigade in the 23rd Division in August 1915 for service on the Western Front and then moved to Italy in November 1917.

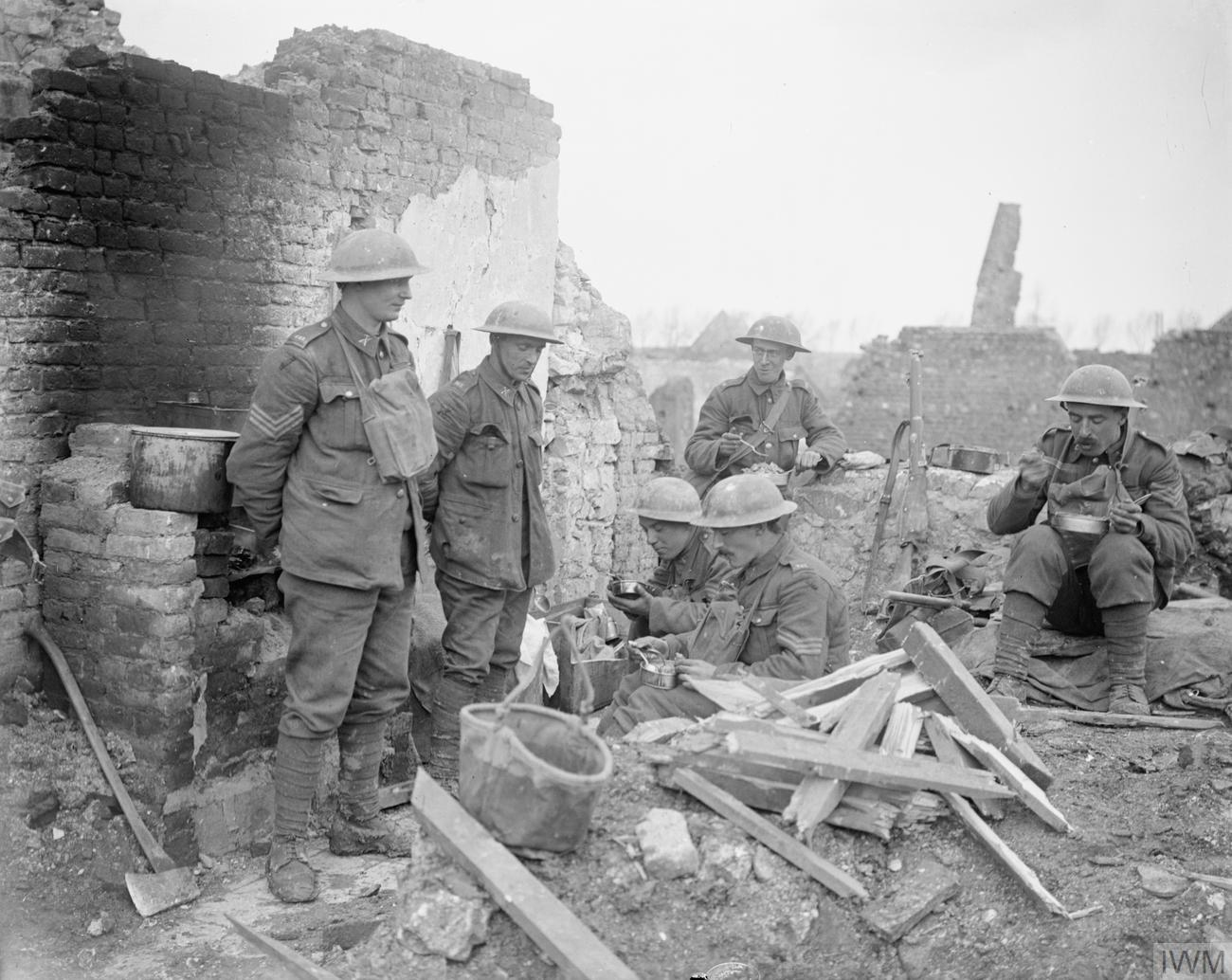
Troops of the 12th (Service) Battalion, KOYLI break for food amdist the ruins of Feuchy, April 1917.

The 9th and 10th (Service) Battalions landed in France as part of the 64th Brigade in the 21st Division in September 1915 also for service on the Western Front. Stuart Cloete, a South African novelist, served with the 9th Battalion at the Battle of the Somme in autumn 1916. The 12th (Service) Battalion (Miners) (Pioneers) landed in Egypt as pioneer battalion for the 31st Division in December 1915 and then moved to France in March 1916 for service on the Western Front.

=== Inter-war ===
In 1921, the regiment became the King's Own Yorkshire Light Infantry.

=== Second World War ===
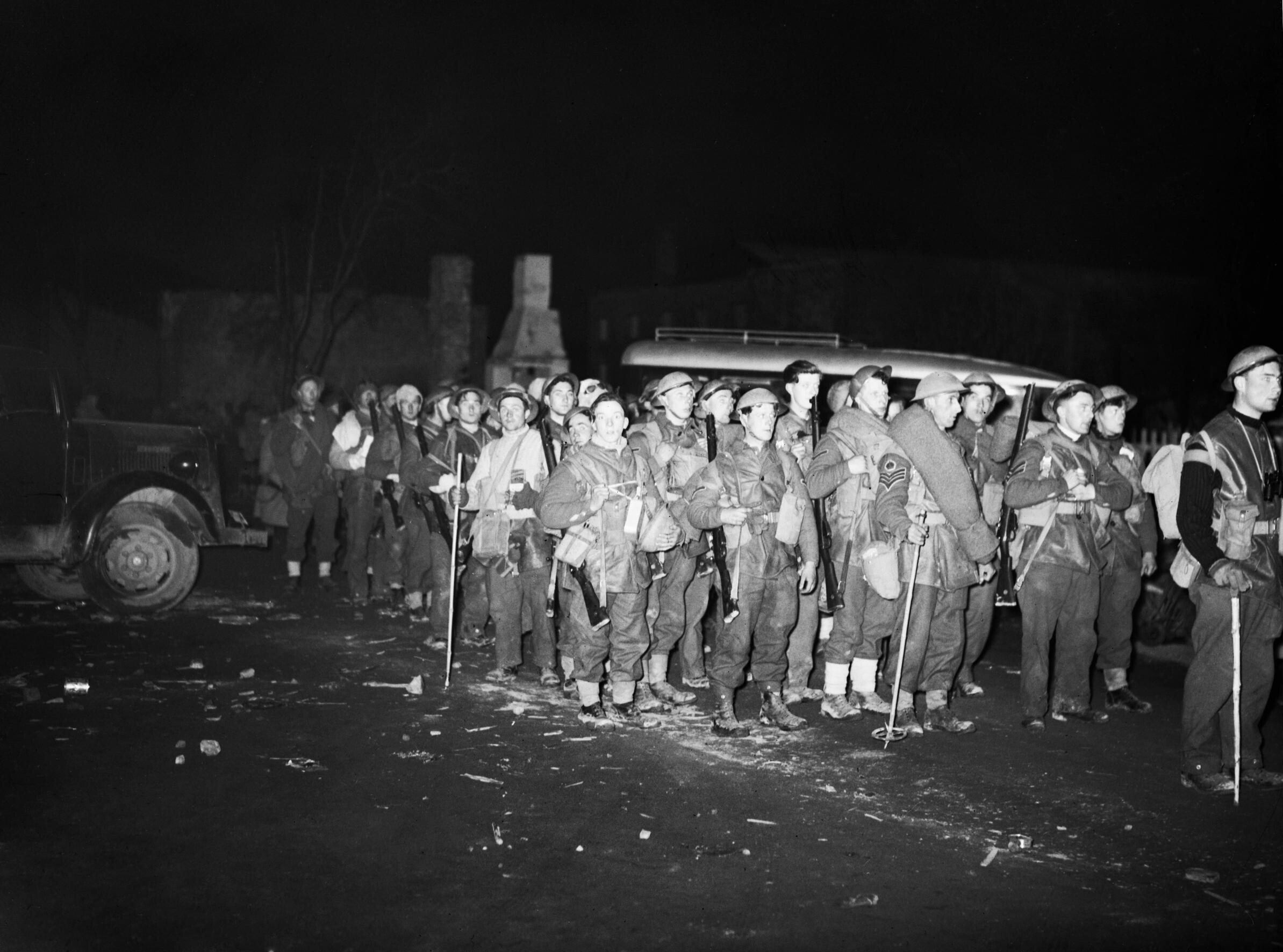
Men of the 1st Battalion, KOYLI arriving on the quayside at Namsos during the evacuation, 2 May 1940.

During the Second World War, the battalions served in all three fronts (Europe, North Africa and Asia-Pacific).

The 1st Battalion, a Regular Army unit, was serving with the 15th Infantry Brigade, alongside the 1st Battalion, Green Howards and the 1st Battalion, York and Lancaster Regiment, and was sent to France in 1939, as part of 5th Infantry Division. In April 1940, with the brigade, the battalion was sent to Aandelsnes, Norway where they saw service as part of "Sickleforce" in the Norwegian Campaign and earned its first battle honour "Kvam" before it was evacuated on 1 May / 2 May. A period of training followed, with the battalion spending time in Scotland, Lancashire and Northern Ireland. In January 1942, the battalion commenced training for tropical service and moved to Poona, India. It was then decided to train for desert warfare and so the battalion was moved to Iran and then the Canal Zone for further training. The battalion next saw action in July 1943 during the Allied invasion of Sicily, and later the Allied invasion of Italy, before fighting through the Italian Campaign, in the Battle of Anzio and Operation Diadem before, in July 1944, being sent to Palestine to rest and refit. The battalion remained there until early 1945, when it was transferred to Italy again, only to be transferred to Marseilles in March 1945 for service in North-western Europe for the invasion of Germany. There, the battalion ended its war, fighting its last action at Potrau on 1 May 1945, some five years after it was evacuated from Norway.

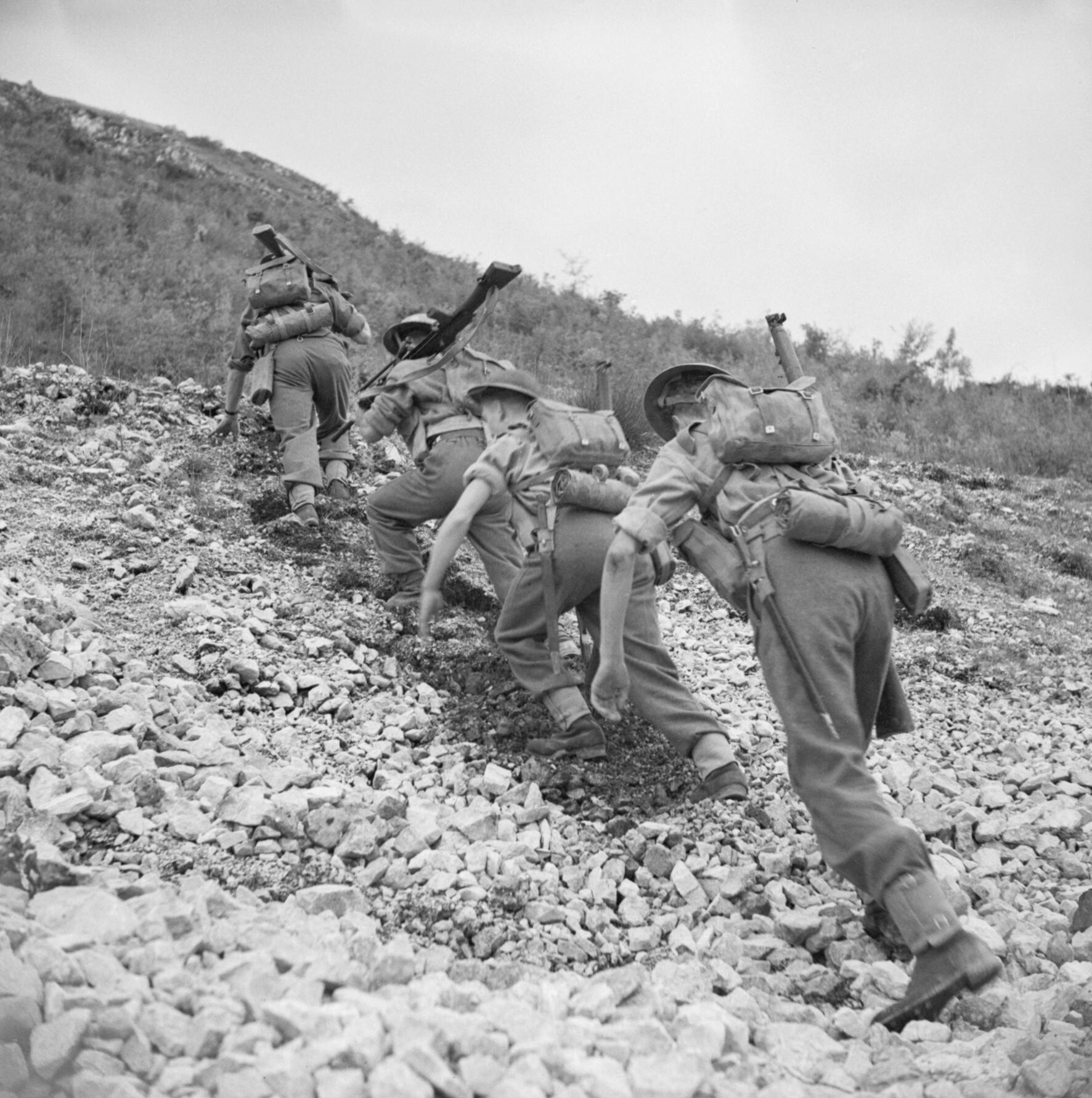
Men of the 1st Battalion, King's Own Yorkshire Light Infantry climb a steep hill in Italy, November 1943.

The 2nd Battalion, also a Regular Army unit, fought as a rearguard in the retreat through Burma in 1942. However, the battalion saw little active service afterwards, remaining in British India on internal security duties.

The 1/4th Battalion served with the 146th Infantry Brigade, 49th (West Riding) Infantry Division throughout the War. The battalion first saw action when it was transferred to Norway in April 1940 as part of the disastrous British and French intervention against the German invasion, serving as part of "Mauriceforce" at Namsos under Major General Adrian Carton de Wiart. The battalion was soon evacuated and was moved to Iceland with the rest of the 49th Division in May 1940 as part "Alabasterforce", where they were part of the occupying garrison until returning to England in August 1942. Following training for the invasion of France, the battalion did not land on D-Day but landed in France on 9 June 1944 and was soon fighting in the Battle of Normandy. The 1/4th Battalion fought during the battle for Caen during Operation Martlet, the Second Battle of the Odon and later clearing the Channel Coast in Operation Astonia, garrisoning "The Island" during the aftermath of Operation Market Garden, where they then fought in the Battle of the Scheldt. The Battalions' last battle was during the Second Battle of Arnhem.

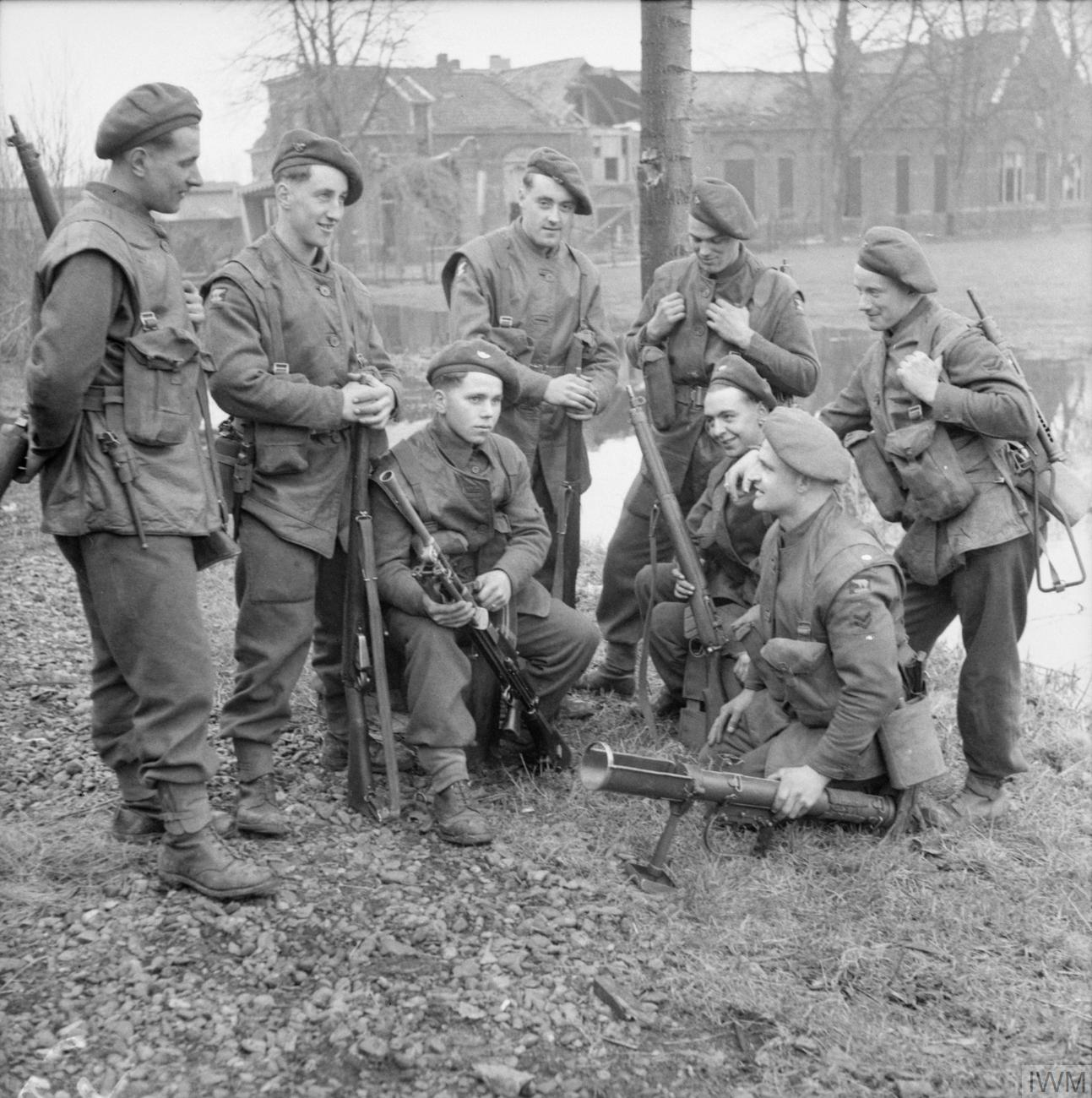
A fighting patrol of the 1/4th Battalion, KOYLI in North West Europe. Armed with rifles, Bren gun, Sten guns and a PIAT, Elst, 2 March 1945.

The 2/4th Battalion was created in 1939 in the Territorial Army when the 4th Battalion was split in two, creating the 1/4th Battalion and the 2/4th Battalion. The 2/4th fought with the 138th Infantry Brigade, part of the 46th Infantry Division in the Battle of Dunkirk with the rest of the BEF. They also fought in the Tunisia Campaign in the final stages of the North African Campaign and later in the Italian Campaign.

The 5th Battalion was transferred to the Royal Artillery before the war and converted into the 53rd (KOYLI) Light Anti-Aircraft Regiment. It served in the Battle of France and on the beach at the Dunkirk Evacuation and was then sent to Egypt, joining the British Eighth Army. It served with the 10th Armoured Division at the Second Battle of El Alamein and then in AA defence of airfields during the Eighth Army's dash to Tunisia. Afterwards, it landed in Sicily and in Italy, where it served as infantry and mortar troops as well as LAA gunners. Before the outbreak of war, the 53rd LAA Regiment formed a duplicate, 57th (KOYLI) LAA Regiment. This saw action in the Anglo-Iraqi War and Syria–Lebanon Campaign, then joined 4th Indian Division, with which it served in Operation Crusader, at Alamein, in Tunisia and Italy. It ended the war as part of the intervention force (Operation Manna) in the Greek rebellion.

The 7th Battalion was formed on 3 July 1940 as an infantry battalion. However, in June 1941, it became the 149th Regiment in the Royal Armoured Corps. The new formation continued to wear their King's Own Yorkshire Light Infantry cap badge on the black beret of the RAC. The regiment was sent to India and became part of 50th Indian Tank Brigade. Following training, the regiment fought at Kohima and Imphal from April to August 1944.

The 8th Battalion was a war service battalion raised in July 1940. It was transferred to the Royal Artillery and became the 94th Light Anti-Aircraft Regiment, Royal Artillery. In June 1942, the regiment became part of the Guards Armoured Division and served with it for the rest of the war, fighting in North-western Europe from June 1944 until May 1945.

The 9th Battalion (formerly the Queen's Own Yorkshire Dragoons) was motorized infantry assigned to the 18th Infantry Brigade and attached to the 1st Armoured Division. The battalion served in the Italian Campaign, fighting particularly severe battles such as that during the Battle of Anzio in early 1944 until, due to a severe shortage of manpower in the Italian theatre, it was disbanded later in the year.

=== Post war ===
Reduced to one regular battalion after the war, the regiment was deployed to Malaya in 1948 to take part in peacekeeping and counter-insurgency operations during the Malayan Emergency. The regiment was then sent to Kenya in 1954 as part of the response to the Mau Mau Uprising. It deployed to Aden in 1955 and to Cyprus in 1956 and returned to Malaya in 1962 during the early stages of the Indonesia–Malaysia confrontation. Its last transfer was to Montgomery Barracks in Berlin in 1967. The regiment was amalgamated with the Somerset and Cornwall Light Infantry, the King's Shropshire Light Infantry and the Durham Light Infantry to form The Light Infantry in 1968.

== Regimental museum ==
The Kings Own Yorkshire Light Infantry Museum is housed in the same building as the Doncaster Museum and Art Gallery.

== Cap badge ==
The badge of the regiment is unique amongst English light infantry regiments as the horn is of the 'French Hunting' type (with a twist). In its centre is the White Rose of York, linking to the regiment's home in Yorkshire.

== Victoria Cross ==
The following members of the regiment were awarded the Victoria Cross:

- Pte C. Ward, South Africa 1900
- Maj C. A. L. Yate, France 1914
- L/Cpl F. W. Holmes, France 1914
- Pte H. Waller, France 1917
- Sgt J. W. Ormsby, France 1917
- Pte W. Edwards, Belgium 1917
- Lt Col O. C. S. Watson, France 1918
- Sgt L. Calvert, France 1918
- Lt Col H. Greenwood, France 1918

Private Ward was the last Victoria Cross holder to actually have his VC pinned on his chest by Queen Victoria herself. He attended Windsor Castle in December 1900 and was the last of the party of four to be decorated. Queen Victoria died the following month.

== Battle honours ==
The regiment's battle honours were as follows:

- From 51st Regiment of Foot: Minden, Corunna, Fuentes d'Onor, Salamanca, Vittoria, Pyrenees, Nivelle, Orthes, Peninsula, Waterloo, Pegu, Ali Masjid, Afghanistan 1878–80
- Burma 1885–87, Modder River, South Africa 1899–1902
- The Great War (26 battalions): Mons, Le Cateau, Retreat from Mons, Marne 1914 '18, Aisne 1914 '18, La Bassée 1914, Messines 1914 '17 '18, Ypres 1914 '15 '17 '18, Hill 60, Gravenstafel, St. Julien, Frezenberg, Bellewaarde, Hooge 1915, Loos, Somme 1916 '18, Albert 1916 '18, Bazentin, Delville Wood, Pozières, Guillemont, Flers-Courcelette, Morval, Le Transloy, Ancre 1916, Arras 1917 '18, Scarpe 1917, Langemarck 1917, Menin Road, Polygon Wood, Broodseinde, Poelcappelle, Passchendaele, Cambrai 1917 '18, St. Quentin, Bapaume 1918, Lys, Hazebrouck, Bailleul, Kemmel, Scherpenberg, Tardenois, Amiens, Hindenburg Line, Havrincourt, Épéhy, Canal du Nord, St. Quentin Canal, Beaurevoir, Selle, Valenciennes, Sambre, France and Flanders 1914–18, Piave, Vittorio Veneto, Italy 1917–18, Struma, Macedonia 1915–17, Egypt 1915–16
- The Second World War: Kvam, Norway 1940, Fontenay le Pesnil, Le Havre, Antwerp-Turnhout Canal, Lower Maas, North-West Europe 1944–45, Mine de Sedjenane, Argoub Sellah, North Africa 1943, Sicily 1943, Salerno, Salerno Hills, Cava de Tirreni, Volturno Crossing, Garigliano Crossing, Minturno, Monte Tuga, Anzio, Gemmano Ridge, Carpineta, Defence of Lamone Bridgehead, Italy 1943–45, Sittang 1942, Burma 1942

== Colonels of the Regiment ==
Regimental Colonels were:

- 1881–1890 (1st Battalion) General Arnold Charles Errington
- 1881–1888 (2nd Battalion) General George Alexander Malcolm, CB
- 1890 General Thomas Addison, CB
- 1890–1893 General James Daubney, DB
- 1893–1903 Lieutenant-General Sir Robert Hume, GCB
- 1903–1913 Lieutenant-General Frederick George Thomas Deshon, CB
- 1913–1927 General Sir Arthur Singleton Wynne, GCB
- 1927–1947 General Sir Charles Parker Deedes, KCB, CMG, DSO
- 1947–1950 Major General William Robb, CBE, DSO, MC
- 1950–1960 Lieutenant-General Sir Harold Redman, KCB, CBE
- 1960–1966 Lieutenant-General Sir Roger Bower, KCB, KBE
- 1966–1968 Major-General Charles Julius Deedes, OBE, MC
- 1968 – Regiment amalgamated with the Somerset and Cornwall Light Infantry, the King's Shropshire Light Infantry and the Durham Light Infantry to form The Light Infantry.

== Sources ==
- Beckett, Ian (2003). Discovering English County Regiments. Shire Publications. ISBN 978-0747805069.
- Forty, George (1998). British Army Handbook 1939–1945. Stroud: Sutton Publishing. ISBN 978-0753703328.
- Joslen, Lt-Col H. F. (2003). Orders of Battle, United Kingdom and Colonial Formations and Units in the Second World War, 1939–1945. Uckfield: Naval & Military Press. ISBN 1-84342-474-6.
- Knowles, Lees (1914). Minden & the Seven Years' War. London: Simpkin, Marshall, Hamilton, Kent & Co.
