= The Light Infantry =

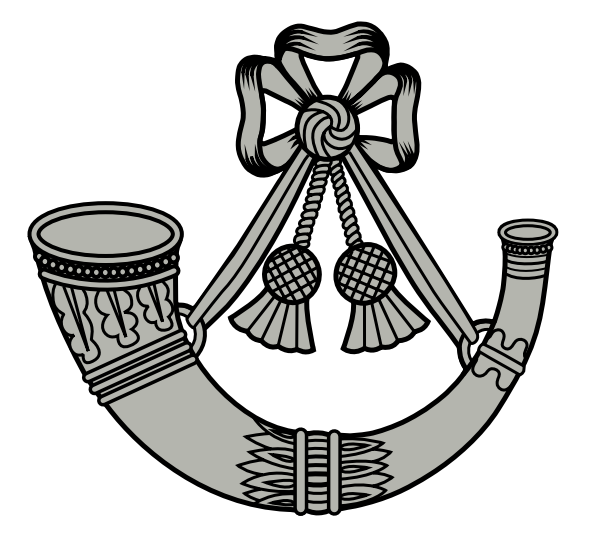
- Cap badge of the Light Infantry
- Active: 10 July 1968–1 February 2007
- Allegiance: United Kingdom
- Branch: British Army
- Type: Light Infantry
- Role: Armoured Infantry (one battalion); Light Role (one battalion)
- Size: Eight Battalions at Max
- Part of: Light Division
- Garrison/HQ: 1st Battalion - Paderborn, Germany; 2nd Battalion - Edinburgh
- Motto(s): Aucto Splendore Resurgo, Cede Nullis, Faithful
- March: Quick - Light Infantry; Double Past - Keel Row
- Anniversaries: Salamanca (22 July)

Commanders
- Last Colonel-in-Chief: HRH Princess Alexandra
- Colonel of the Regiment: Brigadier TJ Gregson MBE

Insignia
- Tactical Recognition Flash

The Light Infantry was an infantry regiment of the British Army, part of the Light Division. The regiment was one of four 'large' regiments formed after the 1966 Defence White Paper through the amalgamation of units of the Light Infantry Brigade. Originally consisting of four battalions, it was later reduced to three battalions, and finally amalgamated into The Rifles with just two battalions which became the 5th and 3rd Battalions respectively.

== History ==
The regiment was formed on 10 July 1968 as a large regiment by the amalgamation of the four remaining light infantry regiments of the Light Infantry Brigade:

- Somerset and Cornwall Light Infantry
- King's Own Yorkshire Light Infantry
- King's Shropshire Light Infantry
- Durham Light Infantry

On 31 March 1969 the 4th Battalion The Light Infantry (formerly The Durham Light Infantry) was disbanded leaving three regular battalions.

The regiment was active all through The Troubles in Northern Ireland with eight soldiers from the regiment killed in the Ballygawley bus bombing.

The remaining battalions remained in service until 1993 when they merged to form two battalions renamed 1st and 2nd Battalions.

== Territorial Army ==
- The Light Infantry Volunteers was formed in the Territorial Army on 1 April 1967 from the territorial battalions of the four predecessor regiments. On 1 August 1972 it was redesignated the 5th Battalion, The Light Infantry. It lost its Cornish company and its last Durham company in 1981, and in 1987 it lost its Yorkshire companies. On 1 July 1999 it amalgamated to form two companies of the new West Midlands Regiment. The West Midlands Regiment was amalgamated to form the 4th Battalion The Mercian Regiment in 2007. E (LI) Company, 4th Battalion, The Mercian Regiment, was transferred to the newly raised 8th Battalion, The Rifles, in November 2017.
- The 6th Battalion was formed in Somerset and Cornwall on 1 April 1971. On 1 July 1999 it amalgamated to form two companies of the new Rifle Volunteers.
- The 7th Battalion was formed in Durham and Yorkshire on 1 April 1975. It began recruiting from Durham only in 1981. On 1 July 1999 it amalgamated to form one company of the new Tyne-Tees Regiment.
- The 8th Battalion was formed in Yorkshire on 1 January 1987. On 3 August 1996 it was converted to a reconnaissance unit as the King's Own Yorkshire Yeomanry. On 1 July 1999 it amalgamated to form one company of the new East and West Riding Regiment.

== Amalgamation ==
In December 2004, it was announced that, as part of the planned Army restructuring published in Delivering Security in a Changing World, the Light Infantry would gain a new battalion through amalgamating with the Devonshire and Dorset Regiment and the Gloucestershire elements of the Royal Gloucestershire, Berkshire and Wiltshire Regiment. However, on 24 November 2005 it was further announced by the Ministry of Defence that, after discussions between the Light Infantry, the Devonshire and Dorset Regiment, the Royal Gloucestershire, Berkshire and Wiltshire Regiment and the Royal Green Jackets, the four regiments would amalgamate to form a single, large regiment to be named The Rifles. The new regiment was formed on 1 February 2007 with 1st Battalion, The Light Infantry becoming 5th Battalion, The Rifles and 2nd Battalion, The Light Infantry becoming 3rd Battalion, The Rifles.

== Alliances ==
- Canada - The Royal Hamilton Light Infantry (Wentworth Regiment)
- Canada - Le Régiment de Maisonneuve
- Canada - The North Saskatchewan Regiment
- New Zealand - The Canterbury, and Nelson-Marlborough and West Coast Regiment
- Pakistan - 11th Battalion, The Baloch Regiment
- Pakistan - 1st Battalion, Sindh Regiment
- Kenya - 1st Battalion, The Kenya Rifles
- Mauritius - Special Mobile Force
- South Africa - The Rand Light Infantry
- Royal Navy - HMS Cornwall
