= 146th Infantry Brigade =

1st West Riding Brigade 146th (1st West Riding) Brigade 146th Infantry Brigade
- Active: 1908–1919; 1920–1945; 1946–1967
- Country: United Kingdom
- Branch: Territorial Army
- Type: Infantry
- Size: Brigade
- Part of: 49th (West Riding) Infantry Division; 49th (West Riding) Armoured Division
- Nickname: "The Polar Bears" (Second World War divisional nickname)
- Engagements: First World War; Second World War

Insignia
- 146th Brigade First World War battle patches (1917).: Top (l-r)1/5th, 1/6th, 1/7th and 1/8th West Yorkshire Regiment, worn on the right sleeve and the back of the collar. Lower (l-r)146th MG company, 146th trench mortar battery.

The 146th Infantry Brigade was an infantry brigade formation of the British Army, part of the Territorial Force (Territorial Army from 1920) with the 49th (West Riding) Infantry Division. The brigade saw active service during both the First and the Second World Wars, and during the early part of the Cold War. The brigade was active from 1908 until 1967 when it was finally disbanded. The brigade was reformed in 1983, though with a much smaller and insignificant role before finally disbanding again in 1993.

== History ==
=== Formation ===
The brigade was raised in 1908 upon the creation of the Territorial Force, formed by the amalgamation of the Volunteer Force and the Yeomanry, as the 1st West Riding Brigade, composed of four Volunteer battalions of the Prince of Wales's Own (West Yorkshire Regiment), including two of the Leeds Rifles. The brigade was assigned to the West Riding Division.

=== First World War ===
On the outbreak of the First World War in early August 1914, the division was immediately mobilised and most men volunteered for overseas service.

In mid-May 1915 the brigade and division would become the 146th (1/1st West Riding) Brigade and 49th (West Riding) Division respectively. The battalions adopted the '1/' prefix (1/5th West Yorks) to differentiate them from their 2nd Line duplicates, which were forming up as 185th (2/1st West Riding) Brigade, of the 62nd (2nd West Riding) Division. The 2nd Line units were raised from those men who did not originally volunteer for overseas service, although many of them did end up seeing active service.

The brigade served on the Western Front from July 1915 to the end of the war in November 1918. Two men from the brigade were awarded the Victoria Cross: Corporal Samuel Meekosha of the 1/6th Battalion and Corporal (later Captain) George Sanders of the 1/7th (Leeds Rifles) Battalion.

==== First World War order of battle ====
- 1/5th Battalion, Prince of Wales's Own (West Yorkshire Regiment)
- 1/6th Battalion, Prince of Wales's Own (West Yorkshire Regiment)
- 1/7th (Leeds Rifles) Battalion, Prince of Wales's Own (West Yorkshire Regiment)
- 1/8th (Leeds Rifles) Battalion, Prince of Wales's Own (West Yorkshire Regiment) (until January 1918)
- 146th Machine Gun Company, Machine Gun Corps (formed 27 January 1916, moved to 49th Battalion, Machine Gun Corps 1 March 1918)
- 146th Trench Mortar Battery (formed 12 June 1916)

=== Interwar ===
Both the brigade and division were disbanded shortly the war when the Territorial Force was itself disbanded. However it was reformed in the 1920s as the Territorial Army and the brigade was reformed with all four battalions of the West Yorkshire Regiment and continued to serve with the 49th Division, now as the 147th (1st West Riding) Infantry Brigade.

In the late 1930s, however, many infantry battalions of the Territorial Army were converted to anti-aircraft and searchlight units and so, in 1936, the 8th (Leeds Rifles) Battalion, West Yorks was transferred to the Royal Artillery and converted into the 66th (Leeds Rifles, The West Yorkshire Regiment) Anti-Aircraft Brigade, Royal Artillery and was transferred to 31st (North Midland) Anti-Aircraft Group, 2nd Anti-Aircraft Division (2nd AA Division was itself formed by redesignation of the HQ of 46th (North Midland) Division). In 1937 the 6th Battalion was also converted to a different role. Transferring to the Royal Engineers, they became 49th (The West Yorkshire Regiment) Anti-Aircraft Battalion, Royal Engineers and became part of the 31st (North Midland) Anti-Aircraft Brigade, alongside the former 8th (Leeds Rifles) Battalion, West Yorks. In April 1938 the 7th (Leeds Rifles) Battalion, West Yorkshire Regiment was transferred to the Royal Tank Regiment and converted into 45th (Leeds Rifles) Royal Tank Regiment.

In late 1936 the 4th Battalion, Lincolnshire Regiment joined the brigade from the 46th (North Midland) Division which had been converted into the 2nd Anti-Aircraft Division. Later, the brigade also received the 4th Battalion, King's Own Yorkshire Light Infantry and the Hallamshire Battalion, York and Lancaster Regiment which transferred in from the 148th (3rd West Riding) Infantry Brigade of the 49th Division. The 5th Battalion, West Yorkshire Regiment, the only original battalion in the brigade, was transferred to 147th (2nd West Riding) Infantry Brigade in 1938 when all brigades were reduced from four to three battalions. In 1939 the brigade was redesignated as the 146th Infantry Brigade

=== Second World War ===
The brigade was mobilised between late August and early September 1939. Shortly after the outbreak of the Second World War the brigade, with most of the 49th Division and 24th Guards Brigade (temporarily attached to the division), saw active service in the Norwegian Campaign in early 1940, which ended in disaster and evacuation.

After briefly returning to the United Kingdom, the brigade and division was later stationed in Iceland, and adopted as its insignia the Polar Bear on an ice floe. In April 1942 they were transferred back to the United Kingdom.

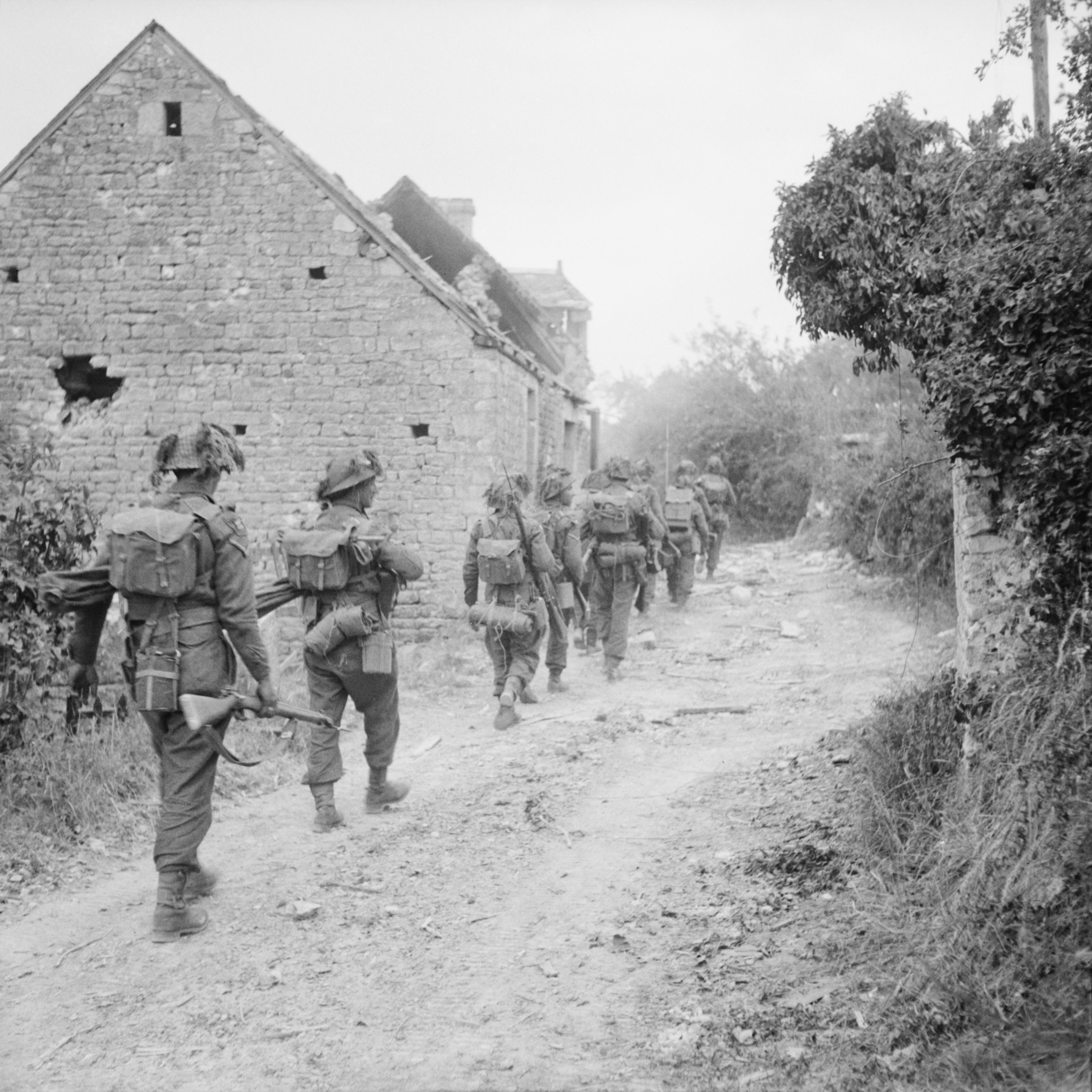
Infantrymen of the Hallamshire Battalion, York and Lancaster Regiment in the village of Fontenay-le-Pesnel, Normandy, France, 25 June 1944.

The brigade remained there, training in many different roles, until early June 1944 when they were sent to Normandy under command of XXX Corps, shortly after the initial landings on 6 June where they fought throughout Operation Overlord in the Battle for Caen during Operation Martlet, Second Battle of the Odon and later, after the breakout and now attached to First Canadian Army, in Operation Astonia, the capture of Le Havre, and the Battle of the Scheldt. The brigade, with the rest of the 49th Division, saw their final battle in the Liberation of Arnhem in April 1945 and the fierce battles that led up to it. During the fighting on the Continent, the 49th Infantry Division was nicknamed "the Polar Bears" because of their divisional insignia. On 28 September 1944 Corporal John William Harper of the Hallamshire Battalion, York and Lancaster Regiment was posthumously awarded the Victoria Cross.

==== Second World War order of battle ====
146th Brigade was constituted as follows during the war:

- 4th Battalion, Lincolnshire Regiment
- 1/4th Battalion, King's Own Yorkshire Light Infantry
- Hallamshire Battalion, York and Lancaster Regiment
- 146th Infantry Brigade Anti-Tank Company (formed 20 March 1940, disbanded 1 August 1941)

==== Commanders ====
The following officers commanded 146th Brigade during the war:

- Brigadier C. G. Phillips (from 2 September 1939 until 12 April 1940)
- Lieutenant-Colonel (Acting) R. W. Newton (from 12 to 17 April 1940)
- Brigadier C. G. Phillips (from 17 April 1940 until 10 March 1941)
- Lieutenant-Colonel C. G. Robins (Acting) (from 10 to 31 March 1941)
- Brigadier N. P. Procter (from 31 March 1941 until 11 April 1943)
- Lieutenant-Colonel R. L. de Brisay (from 11 April until 1 May 1943)
- Brigadier N. P. Procter (from 1 May 1943 until 20 January 1944)
- Brigadier A. Dunlop (from 20 January until 19 June 1944)
- Brigadier J. F. Walker (from 19 June until 6 December 1944)
- Brigadier D. S. Gordon (from 6 December 1944 until 25 July 1945)
- Lieutenant-Colonel (Acting) M. B. Jenkins (from 25 July until 3 August 1945)
- Brigadier D. S. Gordon (from 3 August 1945)

== Victoria Cross recipients ==
- Corporal Samuel Meekosha, 1/6th Battalion, Prince of Wales's Own (West Yorkshire Regiment), Great War
- Corporal George Sanders, 1/8th (Leeds Rifles) Battalion, Prince of Wales's (West Yorkshire Regiment), Great War
- Corporal John William Harper, Hallamshire Battalion, York and Lancaster Regiment, Second World War

== Bibliography ==
- Cole, Howard (1973). Formation Badges of World War 2 Britain, Commonwealth and Empire. London: Arms and Armour Press.
- Hibbard, Mike; Gibbs, Gary (2016). Infantry Divisions, Identification Schemes 1917 (1 ed.). Wokingham: The Military History Society.
- Joslen, H. F. (2003) [1960]. Orders of Battle: Second World War, 1939–1945. Uckfield, East Sussex: Naval and Military Press. ISBN 978-1-84342-474-1.
