= List of York and Lancaster Regiment battalions =

List of Battalions of the York and Lancaster Regiment:

== List of Battalions ==
=== Regulars ===
- 1st Battalion (Regular) - World War I - 83rd Brigade, 28th Division. World War II - 15th Brigade, 5th Infantry Division
- 2nd Battalion (Regular) - World War I - 16th Brigade, 6th Division. World War II - 14th Brigade, 6th Infantry Division (later 70th Infantry Division)

=== Militia ===
- 3rd (Militia) Battalion (3rd West York Regiment of Militia)

=== Territorials and Volunteers ===
- 1st (Hallamshire) Volunteer Battalion (1881–1908)
- 2nd Volunteer Battalion (1881–1908)
- 4th (Hallamshire) Battalion (1908–1924) formerly 1st (Hallamshire) Volunteer Battalion
- 5th Battalion (1908–1936) formerly 2nd Volunteer Battalion
- 67th (York and Lancaster Regiment) Heavy Anti-Aircraft Regiment, Royal Artillery (1936–47) formerly 5th Battalion
- The Hallamshire Battalion (1924–1967)
- Yorkshire Volunteers (1967–1993)
- The Hallamshire (T) Battalion (1967–1971)

=== Hostilities only units ===
- 1/4th (Hallamshire) Battalion - 148th (3rd West Riding) Brigade, 49th (West Riding) Infantry Division
- 1/5th Battalion - 148th (3rd West Riding) Brigade, 49th (West Riding) Infantry Division
- 2/4th (Hallamshire) Battalion (1914–19) – 2nd Line Territorial Force (TF) – 187th Brigade, 62nd (2nd West Riding) Division
- 3/4th (Hallamshire) Battalion (1915–19) – 3rd Line TF – Home Service
- 2/5th Battalion (1914–18) – 2nd Line TF – 187th Brigade, 62nd (2nd West Riding) Division
- 3/5th Battalion (1915–16) – 3rd Line TF – Home Service
- 6th (Service) Battalion (1914–19) – 32nd Brigade, 11th (Northern) Division
- 6th Battalion (1939–47) – 2nd Line TA – 138th Infantry Brigade, 46th Division
- 7th (Service) Battalion (Pioneers) (1914–19) – 50th Brigade, 17th (Northern) Division
- 7th Battalion (Pioneers) (1940–46) – served in India throughout the war
- 8th (Service) Battalion (1914–19) – 70th Infantry Brigade, 23rd Division
- 8th Battalion (Pioneers) (1940–45) – Indian 25th Division
- 9th (Service) Battalion (1914–19) – 70th Brigade, 23rd Division
- 9th Battalion (1940–46) – Indian 25th Division
- 10th (Service) Battalion (1914–18) – 63rd Infantry Brigade, 21st Division (attached to 37th Division from 1916)
- 10th Battalion (1940–41) – converted to 150th Regiment, Royal Armoured Corps, 254th Indian Tank Brigade
- 11th (Reserve) Battalion (1914–16) – 90th Brigade, 33rd Division – Home Service, disbanded 1916
- 11th Battalion (1940–44)
- 12th (Service) Battalion (Sheffield) (1914–18) – 94th Brigade, 31st Division
- 13th (Service) Battalion (1st Barnsley) (1914–15) – 94th Brigade, 31st Division (attached 93rd Brigade from Feb. 1918)
- 14th (Service) Battalion (2nd Barnsley) (1914–18) – 94th Brigade, 31st Division
- 15th (Reserve) Battalion (1915–1916) – Home Service
- 16th (Transport Workers) Battalion (1916–19) – Home Service
- 17th (Labour) Battalion (1916–17) – Home Service
- 18th (Service) Battalion (1918) – 41st Brigade, 14th (Light) Division (from June 1918)
- 50th (Holding) Battalion (1940)
- 53rd (Service) Battalion (1919)
