= Douglas Kendrew =

Army officer & England international rugby union player (1910–1989)

Major-General Sir Douglas Kendrew KCMG CB CBE DSO & Three Bars

22nd Governor of Western Australia
- In office 25 October 1963 – 6 January 1974
- Monarch: Elizabeth II
- Premier: Sir David Brand; John Tonkin
- Preceded by: Sir Charles Gairdner
- Succeeded by: Sir Hughie Edwards

Personal details
- Born: Douglas Anthony Kendrew; 22 July 1910 Barnstaple, Devon, England
- Died: 28 February 1989 (aged 78) Islip, Northamptonshire, England

Military service
- Allegiance: United Kingdom
- Branch/service: British Army
- Years of service: 1930–1963
- Rank: Major-General
- Unit: Leicestershire Regiment
- Commands: Cyprus District (1956–58); 29th Infantry Brigade (1952–53); Army Apprentices School, Harrogate (1948–50); 128th Infantry Brigade (1944–46); 6th Battalion, York and Lancaster Regiment (1943–44)
- Battles/wars: Second World War; Korean War
- Awards: Knight Commander of the Order of St Michael and St George; Companion of the Order of the Bath; Commander of the Order of the British Empire; Companion of the Distinguished Service Order & Three Bars; Venerable Order of Saint John; Mentioned in Despatches

Rugby union career
- Position: Prop
Senior career
Years	Team	Apps	(Points)
1930–1936	Leicester	30	(17)
International career
Years	Team	Apps	(Points)
1930–1936	England	10	(3)

Major-General Sir Douglas Anthony Kendrew, KCMG, CB, CBE, DSO & Three Bars (22 July 1910 – 28 February 1989) was an officer of the British Army who served in the Second World War and the Korean War, an international rugby player, and the 22nd Governor of Western Australia from 1963 to 1974. Kendrew was sometimes known as Joe Kendrew, especially during his rugby career.

== Early life, family and rugby career ==
Douglas Anthony Kendrew was born in Barnstaple, Devon, England on 22 July 1910: he was the elder son of Alexander John Kendrew (1881–1929) and Eva Stella, née Faviell (1880–1952), and was educated at Uppingham School. He married in 1936 Nora Elizabeth Harvey, of Malin Hall, County Donegal, daughter of John Harvey (1865–1940) and Florita Anna, née O'Donoghue (1874–1943); the couple had a son and a daughter. His daughter Marcia subsequently married Colonel Richard Abel Smith, the son of Sir Henry Abel Smith, a Governor of Queensland.

Kendrew played rugby union for England 10 times and was captain of the team in 1935. He was a member of the 1930 British Lions tour of Australasia but did not represent the Lions in any of the test matches. He captained the Army Rugby Union team in the Army Navy Match against the Royal Navy winning 11–8, on 2 March 1935. In that match he played in a formidable front row of prop Frank Whitcombe and hooker A. J. A. Watson, in a famous victory with the Army team having only 13 players; for most of the match the scrum packed down with only six forwards due to injuries.

== Military career ==
Kendrew joined Uppingham School Officer Training Corps, and attained the rank of cadet under officer.

Kendrew was commissioned as a second lieutenant with the Leicestershire Regiment Supplementary Reserve of Officers on 18 January 1930, and joined the regiment on 28 August 1931. He was promoted to lieutenant in 1934, captain in 1939 and major in 1946 (he held appointments as acting or temporary major, lieutenant colonel, colonel and brigadier at various times and ended the war as a war substantive lieutenant colonel). From November 1936 until December 1938 he served as assistant instructor and instructor at the Tank Driving and Maintenance School (subsequently the Armoured Fighting Vehicle School) at Bovington Camp. Kendrew was then an instructor at the Royal Military College, Sandhurst until 1 September 1939, the day the Second World War began.

During the war, Kendrew served in North Africa and Italy as a brigade major with the 36th Brigade from 1942. From 12 February 1943 until 18 March 1943 he was a general staff officer, 2nd grade (GSO2) (Operations) at First Army headquarters in Tunisia. He commanded the 6th Battalion, York and Lancaster Regiment, of 138th Infantry Brigade in 46th Infantry Division, in North Africa and Italy in 1943 and served as commander of the 128th (Hampshire) Infantry Brigade in Italy, Middle East, Greece and Austria between 1944 and 1946. His leadership and bravery saw the distinction of him being appointed a Companion of the Distinguished Service Order with three bars during this period.

After the war, from June until November 1946, Kendrew was general staff officer, 1st grade (GSO1) (Infantry) at Central Mediterranean Forces headquarters. Two training appointments followed immediately: until August 1948 he was commandant at the School of Infantry of the British Army of the Rhine and then commandant at the Army Apprentices School, Harrogate until 13 September 1950. Kendrew had been appointed several times as acting and temporary lieutenant colonel, colonel and brigadier from March 1943 and on 28 July 1951 he received the permanent rank of colonel. He was appointed to the Adjutant General's and Quartermaster General's Staff, Northern Ireland District in October 1950 and served there until 27 September 1952.

During the Korean War, as a temporary brigadier, Kendrew commanded the 29th Infantry Brigade, Commonwealth Division and received the rare distinction of a fourth award of the DSO. In 1954 and 1955 he served at the Imperial Defence College. He was Brigadier A/Q at the adjutant general's & Quartermaster General's Staff at Headquarters Northern Command (York) from 10 March 1955 until 28 September 1956.

Kendrew was appointed in the temporary rank of major general as general officer commanding and director of operations Cyprus District in October 1956 until October 1958, during a turbulent period of British rule. In September 1958 he survived an assassination attempt by EOKA fighters, which killed one of his escorts. During his time in Cyprus, Kendrew's permanent rank was advanced to brigadier on 19 April 1957, and then to that of major general on 29 June.

For two years from December 1958, Kendrew was director of infantry at the War Office in London. He was the director of information at the War Office from 1959 to 1960 and then head of British Defence Liaison Staff at the British High Commission to Australia in Canberra from 1961 to 1963. He retired from the army on 1 September 1963.

== Governorship and retirement ==
As a retired officer, Kendrew became Colonel of the Royal Leicestershire Regiment from May 1963 until the reorganisation in September 1964, when he became Deputy Colonel of The Royal Anglian Regiment, holding the post until August 1965.

Kendrew was appointed Governor of Western Australia on 23 September 1963, serving until 6 January 1974. His term was extended twice.

Kendrew was honorary colonel of the Special Air Service Regiment, RWAR Australia in 1965; president of the Knights of the Round Table (1975–83); commissioner, Royal Hospital, Chelsea (1974–80).

Kendrew died on 28 February 1989 at Islip, Northamptonshire.

== Awards and decorations ==
- Knight Commander of Order of St Michael and St George (12 July 1963)
- Companion of the Order of the Bath (1 January 1958 – New Year's Honours 1958)
- Commander of the Order of the British Empire (21 December 1944 (Italy))
- Companion of the Distinguished Service Order and Three Bars (1 June 1943 (North Africa), 13 January 1944 (Italy), 4 May 1944 (Italy) and 8 December 1953 (Korea))
- Mentioned in Despatches (23 September 1943 (North Africa))
- Honorary LLD from the University of Western Australia (1969)
- Knight of the Order of St John (June 1964)

== Tribute ==
In April 2012, the former RAF Cottesmore in Rutland was renamed Kendrew Barracks after him.

Honorary titles
Preceded by Sir Colin Callander	Colonel of the Royal Leicestershire Regiment; 1963–1965	Succeeded by Regiment consolidated to form the Royal Anglian Regiment
Government offices
Preceded by Sir Charles Gairdner	Governor of Western Australia; 1963–1973	Succeeded by Sir Hughie Edwards
