= 2nd Battalion, York and Lancaster Regiment =

- Active: 1881–1948; 1952–1955
- Country: United Kingdom
- Branch: British Army
- Type: Infantry
- Size: Battalion
- Part of: York and Lancaster Regiment
- Nicknames: The Young and Lovelies
- Engagements: Battle of Tel-el-Kebir; First World War; Second World War
- Battle honours: Mons; Cambrai; Ypres; Somme; Crete; Tobruk; Chindits

The 2nd Battalion, York and Lancaster Regiment was an infantry battalion of the British Army created in 1881 by the redesignation of the 84th (York and Lancaster) Regiment of Foot in 1881. The battalion was in existence from 1881 until 1948, when it amalgamated with the 1st Battalion.

== History ==
The 2nd Battalion's first action was in the 1882 Anglo-Egyptian War, where it fought at the Battle of Tel-el-Kebir under Lieutenant-General Sir Garnet Wolseley. The 1st Battalion fought in the Urabi Revolt of 1884. From Egypt it was sent to England before going to Bermuda in 1883, Nova Scotia, back to the West Indies and then on to South Africa (where they fought in the Second Matabele War) before going to India and finally Limerick in Ireland by 1912.

=== Matabele War ===
In March 1891 the 2nd Battalion left the West Indies bound for Cape Town, where detachments were sent on garrison duty all around South Africa. Some of the companies were trained as mounted infantry. In 1894 a large portion of the battalion was shipped to Mauritius just as rebellion was breaking out in Rhodesia where a large Matabele force entered the British colony of Mashonaland. A Matabele and Mashona revolt broke out, the beginning of the Second Matabele War. The future Field Marshal Herbert Plumer lead columns containing Yorks and Lancs as did Lieutenant-Colonel Robert Baden-Powell. Military operations in Rhodesia ended in October 1897. The British South Africa Company awarded medals to members of the regiment for their services.

=== The Warren Hastings ===
In January 1897 the 2nd Battalion, with members of the 60th Rifles was embarked on the ship Warren Hastings bound for India. On the way to Mauritius to pick up the detachment left there in 1894 the ship foundered off the island of Réunion. Although she did not sink she was a total loss. Not one single life was lost and this has been attributed to the complete lack of panic and the strong discipline exhibited by the soldiers on board. Two officers and two soldiers were awarded the Silver Medal of the Royal Humane Society, another received the Lloyd's Silver Medal whilst another received a Meritorious Service Medal for their actions in saving lives. Queen Victoria sent a letter to the regiment congratulating them on their discipline.

== First World War ==
=== 1914 ===
During the First World War the 2nd Battalion served in France and Flanders with the 16th Brigade, 6th Division. At the outbreak of war the battalion was based in Ireland from there they were hurried to the front in Belgium; they landed in France on 6 October 1914. The first action the 2nd Battalion was involved in was during the Race to the Sea when they fought at the Battle of Armentières. They relieved greatly reduced battalions of Lincolnshire Regiment and the Royal Scots Fusiliers, which had just fought in the Battle of the Marne, and received their first casualties (three killed and eleven wounded) that night from German artillery. The 2nd Battalion along with the 1st Battalion, Buffs (East Kent Regiment) in a fast reconnaissance advanced and took the village of Radinghem on 18 October before coming under fierce machine gun fire. The two battalions were forced back by a fierce German counterattack but according to Marden's History of the 6th Division; the situation was saved by Major Bayley's company from the Yorks and Lancs. Bayley's company worked its way around the left flank of the Germans, forcing them to halt their attack. The 6th Division fought a fierce battle for the high ground on a line from Preniesques to Radinghem. The fighting lasted from 20 to 31 October when the 6th Division was forced into low ground. After a brilliant defence by The Buffs and the 2nd Yorks and Lancs, Radinghem was lost and the 6th Division was forced into a line they would remain in for the next few months and the German offensive of 1918 would find the British still holding. The 6th Division suffered nearly 4,700 casualties in this battle.

=== 1915 ===
The 2nd Battalion spent most of the early part of 1915 holding a relatively quiet sector of the front. In July 1915 they were moved to the northwest of Ypres where they were involved in attempting to restore the line around Hooge which had been under heavy attacks after the Second Battle of Ypres ended. On 9 August 1915, at 3.15 am, the 6th Division launched an attack along a 1,000 yard front with the 2nd Yorks and Lancs on the left of the attack, supported by the 1st Buffs. The attack was completely successful with all objectives recaptured. The Yorks and Lancs were awarded the battle honour Hooge 1915 for their part in this battle. The battalion remained in this area for the rest of 1915.

=== 1916 ===
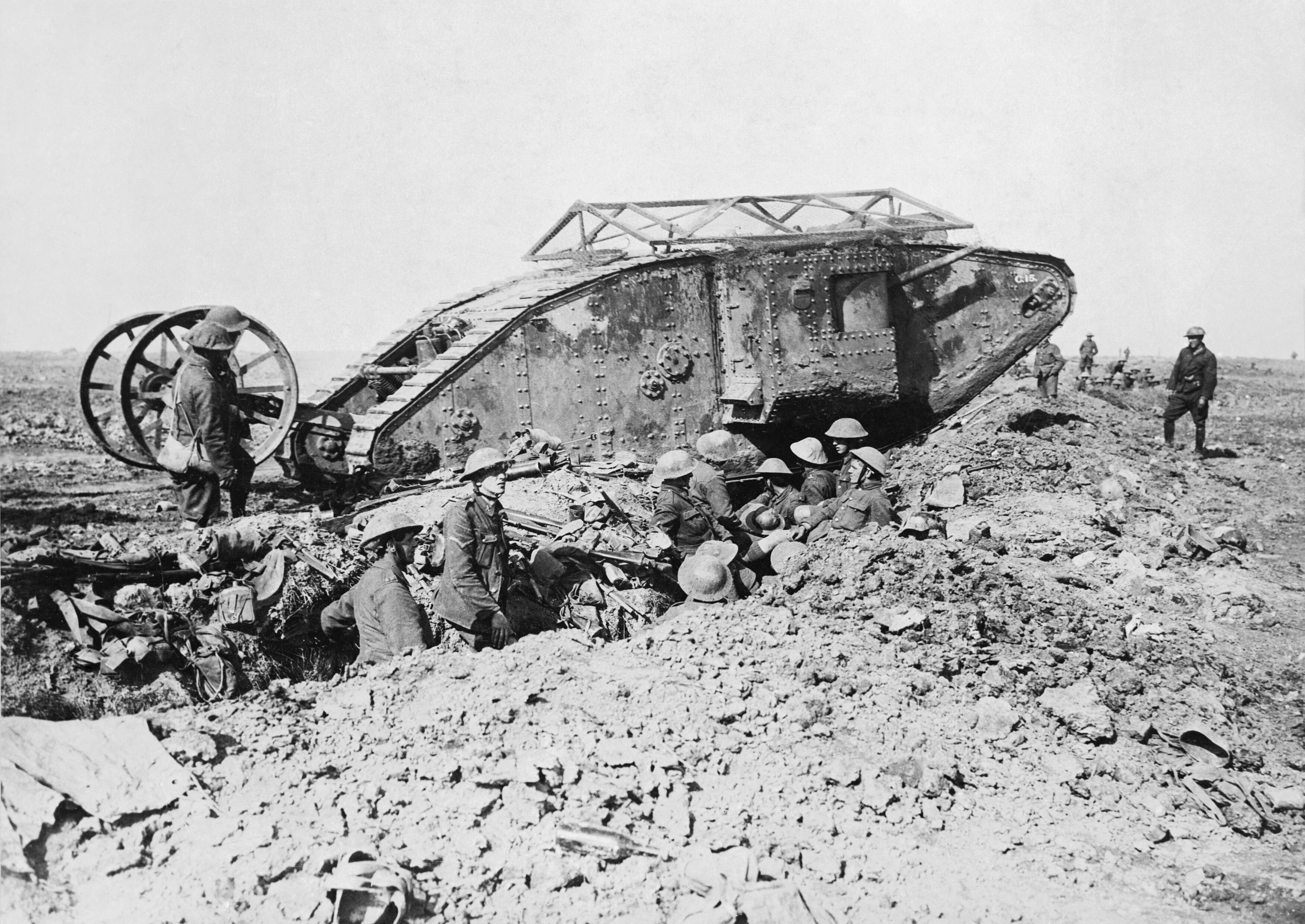
C-15, a British Mark I "male" tank, 25 September 1916. Photo by Ernest Brooks.

The 2nd Battalion fought through the later battles of 1915 and was involved in the first battle that used tanks toward the end of the Somme campaign in 1916. At the Battle of Morval (25 to 27 September 1916) the 6th Division began their attacks on the morning of 25 September, which took all their objectives. The 2nd Yorks and Lancs, with the 1st King's Shropshire Light Infantry, captured the final objectives. With good weather and a well co-ordinated creeping artillery barrage the attack was one of the most successful of the Somme Campaign, with the 6th Division capturing 500 prisoners, six machine guns and four heavy trench mortars. During the Somme Campaign the 2nd Battalion was involved in three general attacks in September and October. The 6th Division suffered 6,917 casualties during the battle.

=== 1917 ===
After the Somme Campaign the 6th Division was sent to the Loos Salient. Most of the early part of 1917 was relatively peaceful but after the Canadian success at the Battle of Vimy Ridge the Germans began withdrawing from various sectors in front of the British positions. On 13 April 1917, with forewarning that the Germans were going to be withdrawing from their positions in front of the 2nd Yorks and Lancs, the battalion was ordered to closely follow up as the Germans withdrew. The 2nd Battalion followed so closely that they completely occupied all the German positions by 6pm. During the next four days the division advanced so rapidly that they almost managed to capture Hill 70 (a strategically important German position) before the Germans strengthened their resistance. Other than this six-month period in the Loos salient the 2nd Battalion spent the rest of 1917 in various quiet sectors until the Battle of Cambrai began in November 1917.

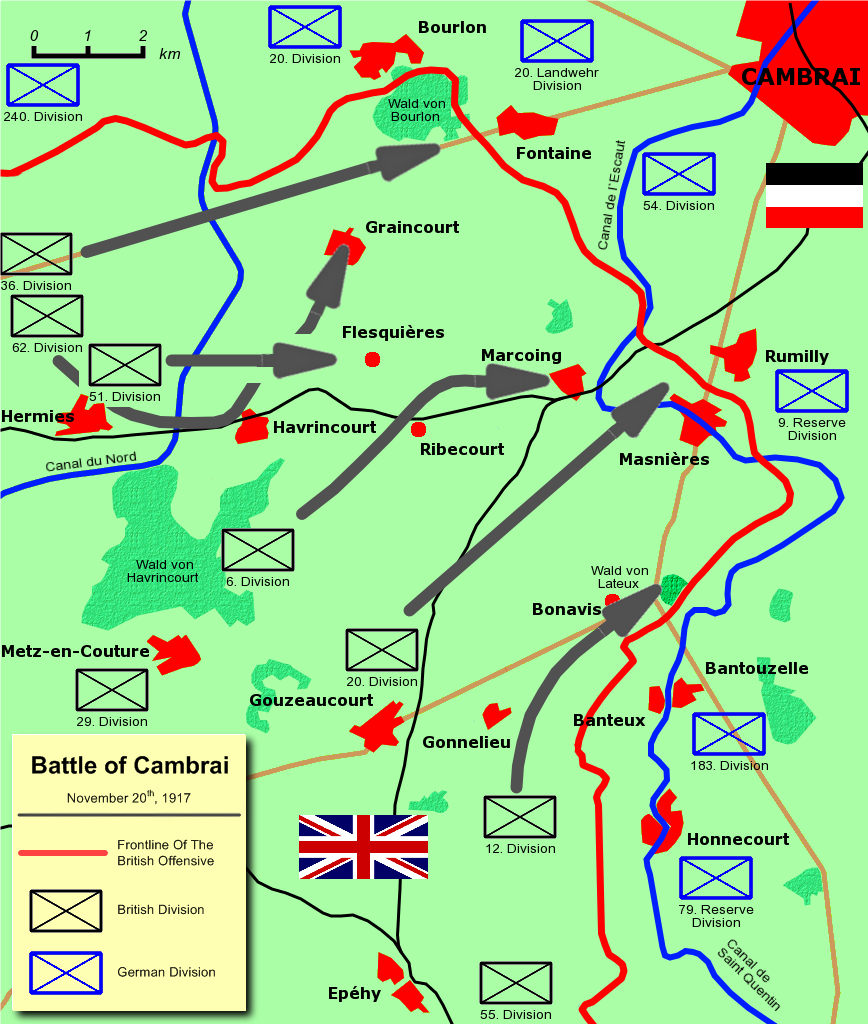
The British Offensive at Cambrai.

The 6th Division were placed in the center of the attack on 20 November 1917, opposite Ribecourt. The 16th Brigade, including the 2nd Yorks and Lancs, were in the first wave of the attack which involved a 4,000 yard advance to take Ribecourt. The 6th Division captured Ribecourt and Marcoing when the cavalry took over the advance. By 7 December, the few positions the British had managed to hold onto, after the German counterattack and the battle had ended, were those gained by the 6th Division at Ribecourt.

=== 1918 ===
In March 1918 the 6th Division was based around Lagnicourt when the German spring offensive was launched. The 6th Division lost over 5,000 men in the first two days of the retreat. During the Battle of the Lys in April 1918 the division suffered further heavy casualties forcing the division out of action until September 1918. In September 1918 the 6th Division went into action for the last time during The Great War when they took part in the Hundred Days Offensive. By 31 October the 2nd Yorks and Lancs were on the banks of the Sambre-Oise Canal when they were withdrawn from the front line. In six weeks of fighting the 6th Division had suffered over 6,200 more casualties. The end of the war found the 6th Division resting in billets near Bohain. The division had suffered over 53,000 casualties during the First World War.

Private John Caffrey was awarded the only Victoria Cross won by the battalion during the First World War in November 1915.

In 1919 the battalion was sent to Iraq with the 17th Division's 51st Brigade.

== Inter-War Years ==
After the Great War the 2nd Battalion were sent to Mesopotamia as part of an occupation force for the British Mandate of Mesopotamia. From 1921 to 1939 they were on garrison duty in India and then Sudan. During their time in India the 2nd Battalion won the Durand Football Cup three times; in 1927, 1929 and 1930.

== Second World War ==
At the out break of the Second World War the 2nd Battalion, York and Lancaster Regiment was based in Khartoum in the Sudan on garrison duties. In July 1940 they were moved to Egypt and then to Palestine where they became part of the 14th Infantry Brigade. The battalion was again part of the 6th Infantry Division. In May 1940 the Brigade moved to Cairo and was then broken up. The 2nd Battalion went to Alexandria. On 28 October Lieutenant-Colonel Sim, C.O. of the battalion, was told by Vice-Admiral Sir Andrew Cunningham, commanding the British Eastern Mediterranean Fleet, that the battalion was now on loan to the Royal Navy and would be moving to Crete as soon as possible in the cruiser HMS Ajax. On 1 November 1940, the battalion sailed for Crete, arriving at Suda Bay on the 2 November. Their arrival was met by an attack from the Italian Air Force. Lance-Corporal Loosemore and Private Lister were both wounded. Loosemore, badly injured in the back from flying shrapnel, had been sheltering from the attack with another 2nd Battalion soldier, Private George Douglas Barker. The Italian bombs demolished all but one wall of the two buildings between which they had been lying. The remaining wall being peppered with shrapnel and about to collapse, Barker, who had miraculously suffered only a bruised cheek in the attack, dragged Loosemore to safety. Handing him over to battalion medical personnel, Barker was sent back for Loosemore's rifle which had been left behind in the rubble. A sudden second wave of attack by the Italians saw Barker almost killed again. Fortunately the second bomb, which had landed mere yards away, was damaged in the fall and failed to detonate. Private Barker survived. Lance-Corporal Loosemore and Private Lister were the battalions first casualties of the Second World War.

On 31 December 1940 Lieut. Col. Sim went to Egypt and Maj. A. Gilroy (Black Watch), who would later command the 14th Infantry Brigade, took command of the battalion. The 14th Brigade was reformed around the 2nd Yorks and Lancs and 2nd Black Watch and under the command of Brig.B.H.Chappel DSO. The brigade spent its time building defenses on the island, but these were limited. Little happened on Crete until April 1941 when the Allied forces in Greece were evacuated.

=== Battle of Crete ===
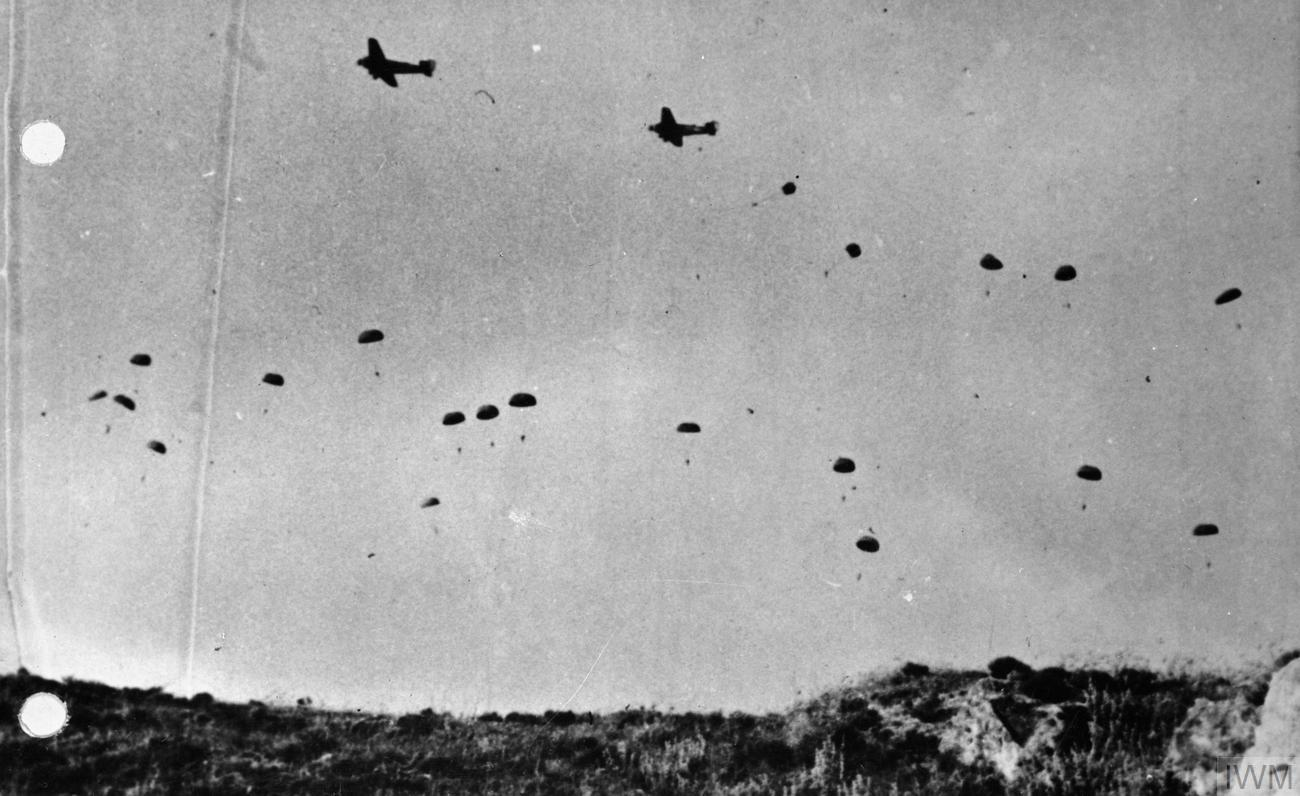
German paratroopers landing on Crete

With the surrender of Greece in 1941 Crete was thrust into the war. The 2nd Battalion, Yorks and Lancs along with the 2nd Battalion, Black Watch and 2nd Bn, The Leicestershire Regiment were tasked with the defence of Heraklion airfield.

From the middle of May 1941 air attacks against Heraklion increased to four or five a day until 20 May when troop carriers dropped paratroopers at Maleme airfield on the west of the island. Warning reached Heraklion as their own share of German troop transports were spotted arriving at about 400 feet four abreast in long columns that stretched out of sight. This was the largest of the German parachute formations made up of the 1st Fallschirmjager Regiment, 2nd Battalion from the 2nd Fallschirmjager Regiment and an AA Machine Gun Battalion under the command of Col. Bruno Brauer.

The three battalions of the 14th Brigade managed to kill or wound nearly all the German parachute troops that were landed at Heraklion on in this first wave, apart from a small pocket, the brigade had inflicted massive casualties on the enemy paratroopers.

In a matter of seconds the air was full of parachutes slowly descending to the ground. The moment the Battalion had waited for had come. Intense small-arms fire caused very heavy casualties among the enemy. Of those who escaped death in the air, the majority were killed on the ground, before they had time to get clear of their harness, by small parties of men rushing from their slit trenches with bayonets and bombs. The tanks and carriers also came out of their hiding-places and massacred all those who landed in the open.

— From 2nd Battalion War Diary

The three battalions of the 14th Brigade managed to destroy nearly all the German parachute troops that were landed at Heraklion on 20 May apart from a small pocket: the brigade inflicted massive casualties on the enemy paratroopers.

The enemy fared no better at the hands of the other units of the garrison. Of about 1,000 enemy troops who had come down inside the perimeter, over 900 of them had been buried by noon the next day. Small parties and odd individuals of course escaped, but these were mopped up during the next few days. Quite a large force, however, had fallen clear of the perimeter and parties of them were heard calling to each other after dark; they made no attempt to attack, being possibly too shaken by what had happened to their comrades. Thus the day ended in complete victory for the Heraklion garrison and the total failure of the Germans to achieve their object of capturing the aerodrome by direct airborne attack.

— From 2nd Battalion War Diary

After this attempt the Germans did not try to land any more paratroopers at Heraklion instead they built up their forces outside the perimeter.

Before the Germans were able to complete the encirclement of Heraklion a company from the 1st Battalion, Argyll and Sutherland Highlanders joined the defence from Tymbaki on the south coast.

The German forces from Maleme landed four more companies of troops in the vicinity of Heraklion which successfully linked up with the survivors of the first landings and launched counterattacks on the British positions. The fighting at this time was extremely fierce but the Yorks and Lancs held their positions. By 28 May the position on the island as a whole had been lost and General Freyberg ordered the evacuation. When the men of the 14th Brigade heard of the evacuation they were astonished;

as to them the whole battle of the last ten days had seemed to have been eminently successful.

— Battalion Hist.

=== The Evacuation ===
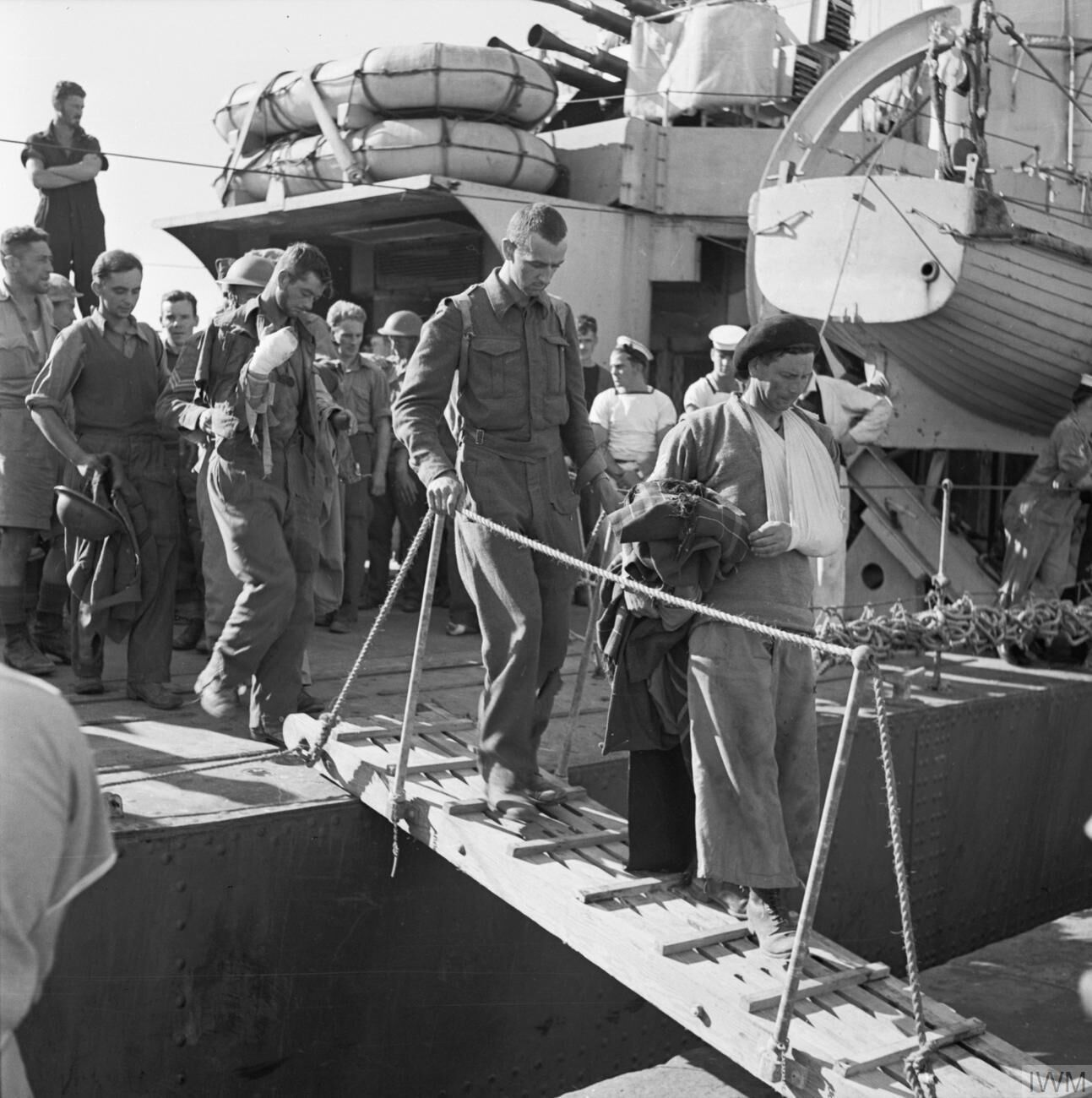
British wounded evacuated to Alexandria

The evacuation was badly attacked during the withdrawal to Alexandria with over one-fifth of the 4,000 troops evacuated being killed, wounded or captured on the voyage out. The destroyer HMS Imperial suffered mechanical failure and had to be sunk by the Hotspur and due to the delay, caused by transferring men over to the other ships, the convoy was still well within reach of the Luftwaffe and Italian Air Force. The Hereward was sunk (her survivors were rescued by the Italians). Both the Dido and the Orion suffered massive bomb damage with heavy casualties amongst the crew and troops packed onboard both ships. Some 600 troops were killed or captured before the convoy could reach safety.

After a brief period of recovery in Egypt the 2nd Battalion was sent with the 14th Brigade to fight the Vichy French forces in Syria. As they arrived at Damascus the French had surrendered. The battalion remained in Syria on occupational duty until mid-October 1941 when they moved to Alexandria to a staging camp from where they would be sent to Tobruk to relieve the besieged Australian 9th Division.

=== Battle of Tobruk ===
The 6th Infantry Division was renumbered as the 70th Infantry Division, for deception purposes, and given a new commander (Maj.Gen. Ronald Scobie) and then were sailed into Tobruk by the Royal Navy from 19 August to 25 October 1941.

The 70th Division along with the Polish Carpathian Brigade, a Czech brigade and the 2/13th Australian Infantry Battalion, which missed the boat out, settled into the considerable defences. The 2nd Battalion was placed in the 2nd line (Blue Line) of defences. In November the garrison was informed of its role in the upcoming Operation Crusader in which the 70th Division would have to break out through the besieging German and Italian force and link up with British Eighth Army.

The 2nd Battalion were one of the reserve battalions in the break out. They suffered massive casualties assaulting the enemy positions after the first assaults. While the relief force got held up fighting toward Tobruk, the battalions of the 70th Division had to hold the positions they had gained and wait. The battle ended up resembling trench warfare from the First World War.

Operation Crusader turned into weeks of attrition the cost of which finally pushed Rommel away from the perimeter of Tobruk allowing Eighth Army to lift the siege. Tobruk would not stay liberated long; during the Battle of Gazala in 1942 the fortress fell with the Axis forces taking thousands of prisoners of war.

=== Chindits ===
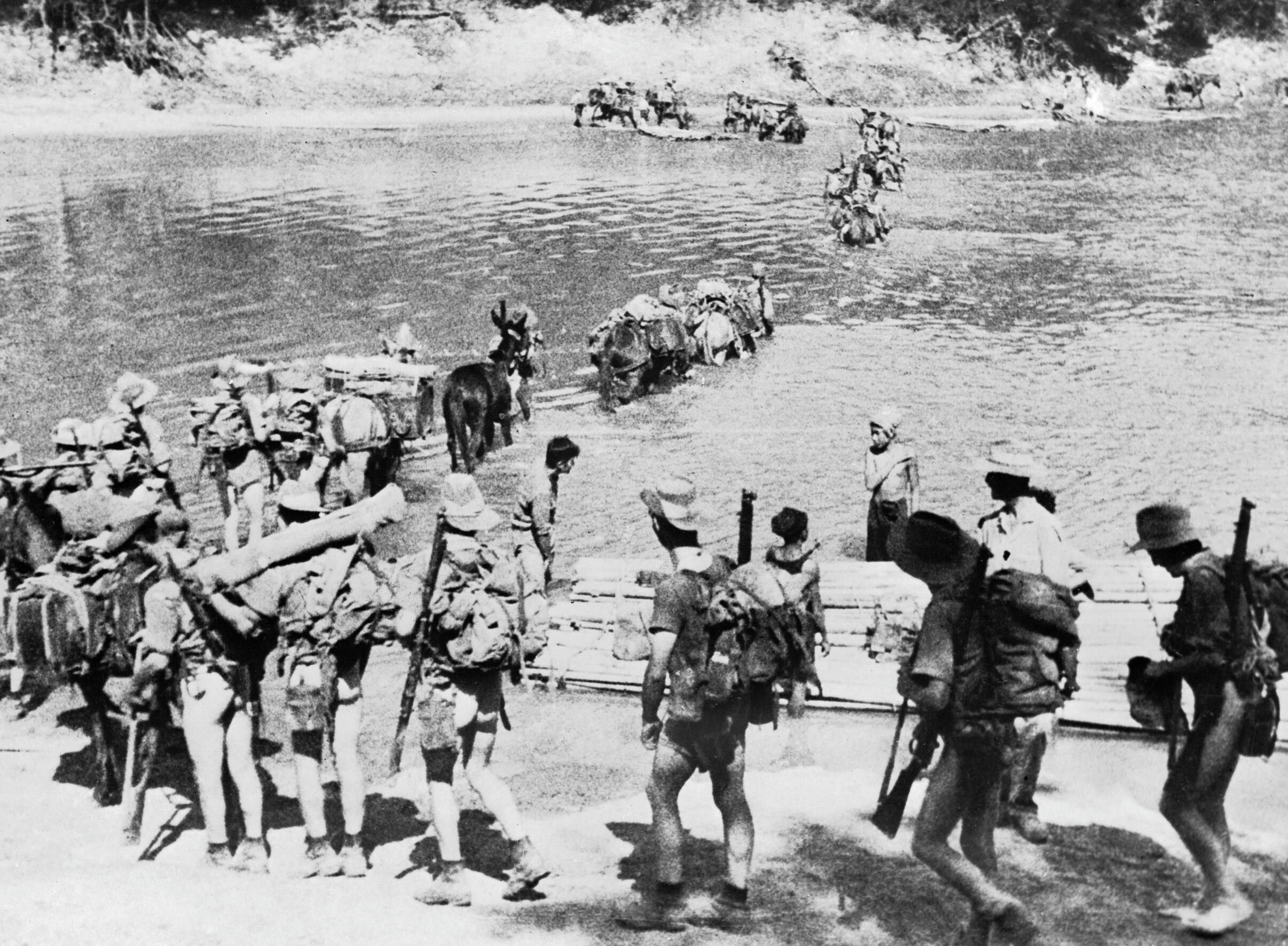
A Chindit column crossing a river in Burma

The 2nd Battalion, however, did not remain in North Africa to see the fall of Tobruk instead they were to head to one of the most difficult fighting terrains in the Second World War, on 28 February 1942 the 70th Division was put aboard ships headed for India to help stop the rapid advance of the Japanese Army in Burma. The 70th Infantry Division, consisting of regular army troops, was considered one of the better and more experienced of the British divisions operating at this stage of the war. The Far East Command fully appreciated the arrival of this formation but instead of using the division as a complete formation it was decided to break it up for long range infiltration operations behind Japanese lines much against the wishes of General Slim, commander of the Fourteenth Army. The units of the division were converted into Chindit brigades and the battalions were organized into columns. The 2nd Battalion became the 65th and 84th columns in the 14th Chindit Brigade.

After months of training and waiting for the right opportunity Operation Thursday began on 5 February 1944: this was the second large scale Chindit operation (Operation Longcloth happened in 1943). The 14th Brigade was flown into a landing strip (called Aberdeen) cut out of the jungle by the 16th Brigade. From Aberdeen the battalion sent out missions to attack Japanese supply lines and communications.

After the death in a plane crash of the commander and creator of the Chindits Maj. Gen. Orde Wingate on 24 March, decisions were made and the plans were changed. Without the force of Wingate driving the operation forward focus for the Chindit forces was switched to battles on the Indian border at Kohima.

The 14th Brigade with the 2nd Yorks and Lancs made an incredible and exhausting march through the heavy jungle, heading north to operate with US Gen. Joe Stillwell. The brigade lost many men on the march and when they arrived were not in any condition to fight immediately. The 14th Brigade remained in action supporting the newly formed 36th Infantry Division until August 1944. Most of the casualties suffered during this campaign were from malaria, dysentery and malnutrition. The battalion was then moved to India and did not take part in any further operations during the Second World War.

Throughout the Second World War the 2nd Battalion had fought against the Germans, Italians, Japanese and the Vichy French in four different campaigns and in extremely different environments.

== Post 1945 ==
In 1947 the 2nd Battalion was given orders for disbanding and amalgamation with the 1st Battalion. It was reformed in 1952 but disbanded again in 1955. In 1968 the York and Lancaster Regiment chose to disband rather than amalgamate further. The colours were laid up in Sheffield Cathedral ending 210 years of the regiment's history. The name would be carried on by The Hallamshire Battalion in various forms.

== See also ==
- List of York and Lancaster Regiment battalions

== Books ==
Donald Creighton-Williamson (1968). The York and Lancaster Regiment. Great Britain: Leo Cooper.
