= John Caffrey =

Recipient of the Victoria Cross

John Joseph Caffrey VC
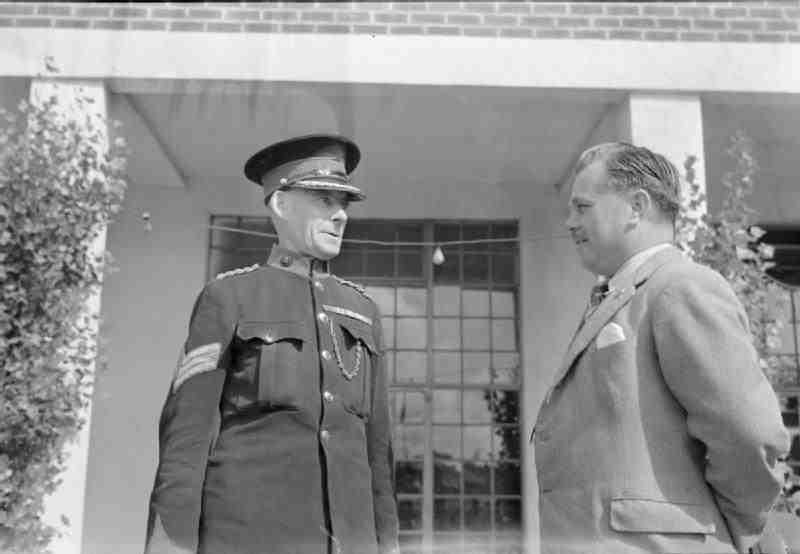
- John Caffrey VC (left).
- Born: 23 October 1891; Birr, Kings County, Ireland
- Died: 22 February 1953 (age 61); Derby, Derbyshire, England
- Burial place: Southern Cemetery, Nottingham, Nottinghamshire, England
- Military career
- Allegiance: United Kingdom
- Branch: British Army
- Rank: Lance Corporal
- Service number: 9730
- Units: Sherwood Foresters; York and Lancaster Regiment; Home Guard
- Conflicts: World War I World War II
- Awards: Victoria Cross; Cross of St. George (4th Class) (Russia)

Lance Corporal John Joseph Caffrey VC (23 October 1891 – 22 February 1953), was a British Army soldier and an Irish recipient of the Victoria Cross (VC), the highest award for gallantry in the face of the enemy that is awarded to British and Commonwealth forces.

== Early life ==
Caffrey left Ireland at an early age and settled in Nottingham (a city in Nottinghamshire, England), joining the British Army in 1910.

== Military service ==
Caffrey was 24 years old, and a private in the 2nd Battalion, York and Lancaster Regiment, of the British Army during the First World War when the following deed took place for which he was awarded the VC.

On 16 November 1915 near La Brique, France, a man was badly wounded and lying in the open unable to move, in full view of and about 350 yards (320 m) from the enemy's trenches. A corporal of the RAMC and Private Caffrey at once tried to rescue him, but at the first attempt were driven back by shrapnel from enemy fire. They tried again and succeeded in reaching and bandaging the wounded man. However, just as they were lifting him up, the RAMC corporal was shot in the head. Private Caffrey bandaged the corporal and helped him back to safety, and then returned and brought in the other wounded man.

Caffrey later achieved the rank of Sergeant and served in the Home Guard during World War II. He was employed in civilian life as a commissionaire. He died in Derby, England on 22 February 1953.

His Victoria Cross is displayed at The York and Lancaster Regiment Museum within the Clifton Park Museum in Rotherham, South Yorkshire, England.

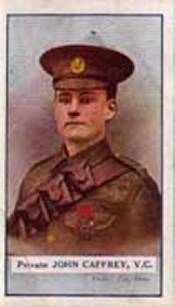
