= 138th (Lincoln and Leicester) Brigade =

Lincoln and Leicester Brigade 138th (Lincoln and Leicester) Brigade 138th Infantry Brigade
- Active: 1908–1919; 1920–1936; 1939–1946
- Country: United Kingdom
- Branch: British Army
- Type: Infantry
- Size: Brigade
- Part of: 46th (North Midland) Division; 46th Infantry Division
- Engagements: First World War; Second World War

Commanders
- Notable commanders: Gerard Bucknall

The 138th (Lincoln and Leicester) Brigade was an infantry brigade of the British Army that saw active service in the First World War with the 46th (North Midland) Division. The brigade again saw active service in the Second World War, with the 46th Infantry Division.

== Formation ==
The brigade was first raised as the Lincoln and Leicester Brigade in 1908 when the Territorial Force was created, by the merger of the Yeomanry and the Volunteer Force. The brigade was assigned to the North Midland Division (one of fourteen of the peacetime Territorials) and consisted of two Volunteer battalions, the 4th and 5th, of the Lincolnshire Regiment and two, the 4th and 5th, of the Leicestershire Regiment.

== First World War ==
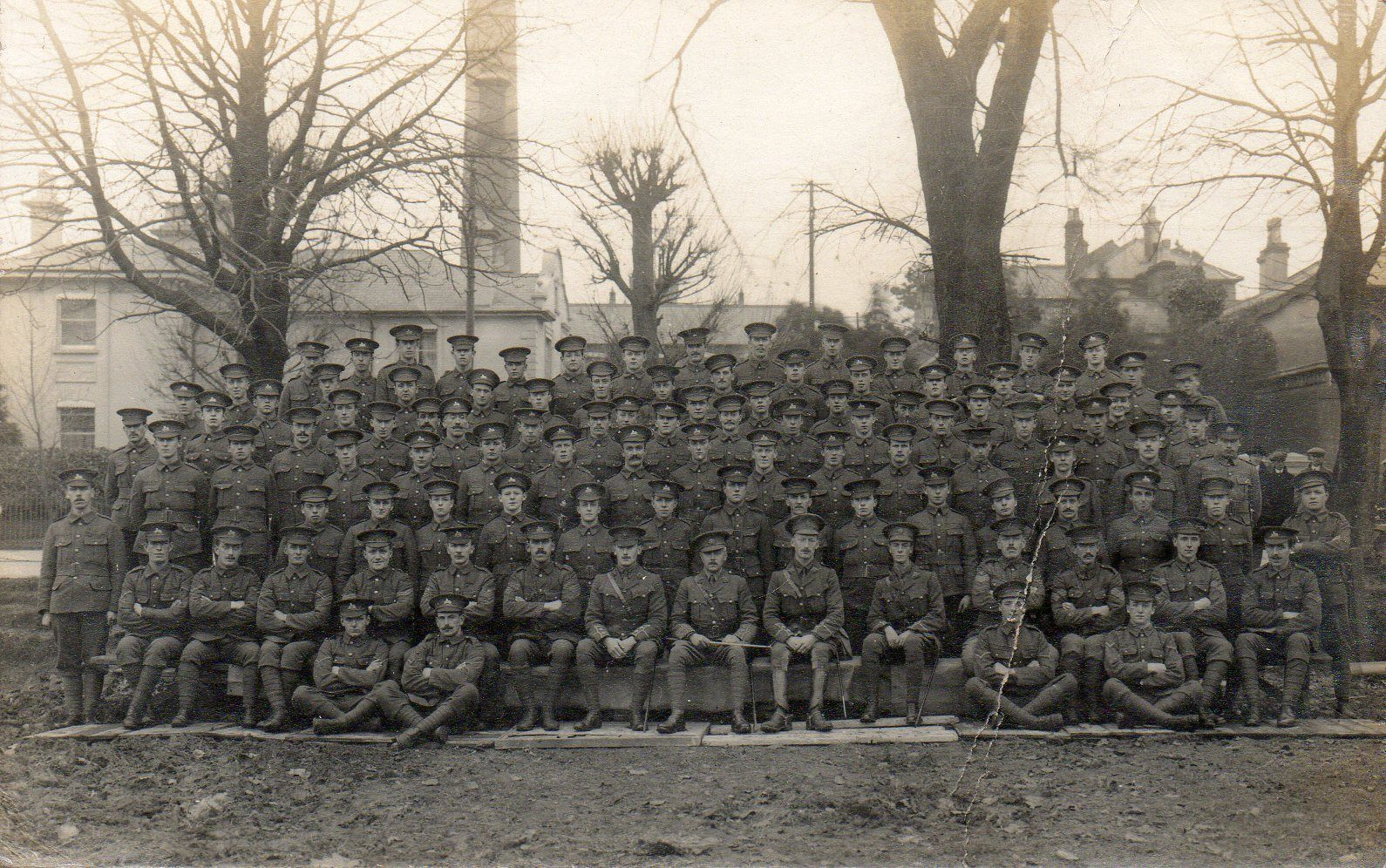
Men of 'G' Company, 1/4th Battalion, Lincolnshire Regiment, in Harpenden, November 1914.

After the outbreak of the First World War in August 1914, most of the men volunteered for Imperial Service and, with the rest of the North Midland Division, trained in Luton for overseas service. In late February 1915 the division began landing in France and was the first complete Territorial division to arrive on the Western Front to reinforce the British Expeditionary Force (BEF) (individual units had been sent throughout the winter of 1914 and early spring of 1915).

On 12 May 1915 the division was numbered the 46th (North Midland) Division the brigade was numbered the 138th (1/1st Lincoln and Leicester) Brigade. The battalions also adopted the '1/' prefix (1/5th Lincolns) to distinguish them from their 2nd Line duplicates training in the United Kingdom as 177th (2/1st Lincoln and Leicester) Brigade, part of 59th (2nd North Midland) Division, which consisted of the men of the brigade and division who had not volunteered for overseas service, together with the many recruits who came flooding in.

The brigade saw service with the 46th Division on the Western Front in France and Belgium for the rest of the war, aside from a few weeks in Egypt, fighting at the Hohenzollern Redoubt in October 1915 after the failure of the Battle of Loos. After this, the division was ordered to Egypt and landed there on 13 January 1916. However, soon after the division was ordered to move back to France.

The brigade and division, alongside 56th (1/1st London) Division, later fought at Gommecourt on 1 July 1916, the first day on the Somme, as a diversion for the Somme offensive being launched a few miles south. The attack was a failure and served only to gain the 46th Division a poor reputation until late September 1918 when, during the Hundred Days Offensive, it re-established its name during the Battle of St. Quentin Canal. During the same month Lieutenant John Cridlan Barrett of the 1/5th Battalion, Leicestershire Regiment was awarded the Victoria Cross. By the time of the Armistice with Germany the division was at Sains-du-Nord.

=== Order of battle ===
138th (Lincoln and Leicester) Brigade had the following composition during the war:

- 1/4th Battalion, Lincolnshire Regiment (left 31 January 1918)
- 1/5th Battalion, Lincolnshire Regiment
- 1/4th Battalion, Leicestershire Regiment
- 1/5th Battalion, Leicestershire Regiment
- 138th Machine Gun Company, Machine Gun Corps (formed 22 February 1916, moved to 46th Battalion, Machine Gun Corps 28 February 1918)
- 138th Trench Mortar Battery (formed 2 March 1916)

== Between the wars ==
Disbanded after the war in 1919 the brigade was reformed in the new Territorial Army in the 1920s, as the 138th (Lincoln and Leicester) Infantry Brigade, still with 46th (North Midland) Infantry Division and still composed of two battalions of the Lincolns and two of the Leicesters.

In the late 1930s, there was a growing need to increase the anti-aircraft defences of the United Kingdom and a reduced need for so many infantry battalions in the Territorial Army and so many of them were converted into other roles. As a result, in late 1936, the 46th (North Midland) Division (and the brigade) was disbanded and its headquarters renamed the 2nd Anti-Aircraft Division. The 5th Lincolns was transferred to the Royal Engineers and converted into the 46th (The Lincolnshire Regiment) Anti-Aircraft Battalion, Royal Engineers and joined 31st (North Midland) Anti-Aircraft Group. The 4th Leicesters were also transferred to the Royal Engineers and became 44th (The Leicestershire Regiment) Anti-Aircraft Battalion, Royal Engineers, assigned to 32nd (South Midland) Anti-Aircraft Group of 2nd AA Division. Both were equipped with searchlights and part of the 2nd AA Division. The 4th Lincolns was transferred to 146th (1st West Riding) Infantry Brigade and the 5th Leicesters joined the 148th (3rd West Riding) Infantry Brigade, both part of the 49th (West Riding) Infantry Division. After all of its battalions were posted away the 138th Brigade was disbanded.

== Second World War ==
A new 138th Brigade was raised in mid-1939 when the Territorial Army was doubled in size throughout the spring and summer of 1939, due to the possibility of war with Nazi Germany becoming an increasing likelihood. As a result, the brigade number was activated again when the 146th Infantry Brigade formed a duplicate unit, to be known as the 138th Infantry Brigade. The new brigade was assigned to the 46th Infantry Division, itself formed as a duplicate of 49th (West Riding) Infantry Division. Like its parent division, the 46th recruited mainly from the North Midlands and West Riding areas in England, although for some reason the division, unlike the 49th, did not adopt the county subtitles.

Due to the worsening situation in Europe, the brigade was mobilised in late August/early September 1939, along with the rest of the Territorial Army. On 1 September the German Army invaded Poland and, two days later, on 3 September 1939, Britain declared war on Nazi Germany, officially beginning the Second World War.

In April 1940, seven months after the outbreak of the war, the 138th Infantry Brigade, commanded at the time by Brigadier Edward John Grinling, DSO, MC, TD, a Territorial Army officer, and division, minus the artillery, engineers and other support units, were sent to France to join the British Expeditionary Force (BEF). The "division", sent at the same time as the 12th (Eastern) and 23rd (Northumbrian) divisions, was very poorly equipped and trained and was assigned mainly as a labour and training unit, to build defences and construct airfield. As a consequence, the division was battered in the Battle of France when fighting the German Army and, together with the rest of the BEF, was gradually forced to retreat to Dunkirk, where they were evacuated to England.

After returning to the United Kingdom the brigade and division, due to severe casualties suffered in a futile attempt to stem the German advance, were both reformed with large numbers of conscripts and was sent to Scottish Command. In 1941 it came under command of II Corps and later XII Corps, commanded at the time by Lieutenant-General Bernard Montgomery, alongside the 43rd (Wessex) Infantry Division and 53rd (Welsh) Infantry Division and trained into an anti-invasion role to repel a German invasion.

On 6 January 1943 the 46th Division left the United Kingdom for North Africa where they saw active service in the final stages of the campaign there, fighting in the Tunisia Campaign as part of British First Army which ended in May with the surrender of over 230,000 German and Italian prisoners of war.

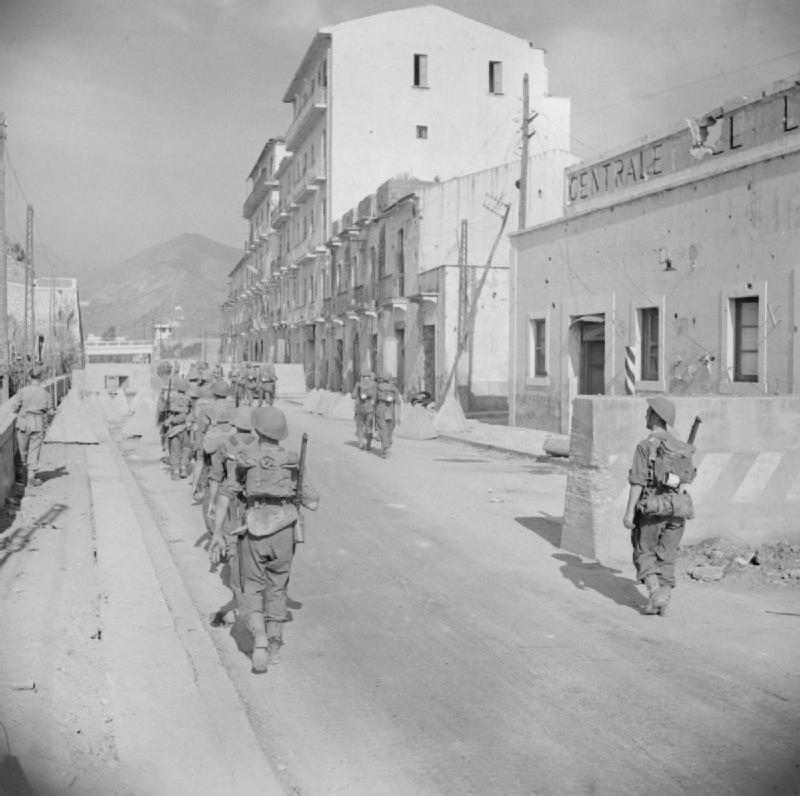
Men of the 6th Battalion, York and Lancaster Regiment, part of the 138th Brigade, British 46th Infantry Division, enter Salerno during the Allied invasion of Italy, 10 September 1943.

With the rest of the 46th Division, the brigade later fought in the Italian Campaign, suffering heavy casualties in the attritional fighting in Italy during the Salerno landings in September 1943 under X Corps, and later the fighting at the Monte la Difenso, Monte Cassino and the Gothic Line, where, during the Battle of Gemmano, the brigade suffered heavy casualties in what has been labelled the "Cassino of the Adriatic". In December 1944, during a heavy counter-attack by the German 90th Panzergrenadier Division on 46th Division's position, Captain John Brunt, of the Sherwood Foresters, attached to 6th Battalion, Lincolnshire Regiment, was posthumously awarded the Victoria Cross.

In mid-January 1945, the brigade and the rest of the division (except 139th Brigade) was transferred to Greece to fight in the Greek Civil War, returning to Italy in April but did not see action in the final offensive. Throughout the campaign in Italy the 46th Division came under command of both U.S. Fifth Army and British Eighth Army.

=== Order of battle ===
138th Brigade was constituted as follows during the war:

- 6th Battalion, Lincolnshire Regiment
- 2/4th Battalion, King's Own Yorkshire Light Infantry
- 6th Battalion, York and Lancaster Regiment
- 138th Infantry Brigade Anti-Tank Company (formed 22 July 1940, joined 46th Reconnaissance Battalion 10 July 1941)

=== Commanders ===
The following officers commanded 138th Brigade during the war:

- Brigadier E.J. Grinling (until 8 August 1940)
- Brigadier G.C. Bucknall (from 8 August 1940 until 13 July 1941)
- Brigadier D.F. Campbell (from 13 July 1941 until 17 March 1942)
- Brigadier A. Low (from 17 March until 26 August 1942)
- Brigadier G.P. Harding (from 26 August 1942 until 23 March 1944)
- Lieutenant Colonel D.P. Yates (Acting, from 23 March until 29 May 1944)
- Brigadier G.P. Harding (from 29 May until 26 September 1944)
- Brigadier M.D. Erskine (from 26 September until 27 October 1944)
- Brigadier A.D. McKechnie (from 27 October until 19 December 1944)
- Lieutenant Colonel A.D. Miller (Acting, from 19 December 1944 until 11 January 1945)
- Brigadier A.D. McKechnie (from 11 January 1945)

== Post-War ==
The war in Europe ended on 8 May 1945, with Victory in Europe Day and the brigade moved to Austria shortly after, spending the rest of its time on occupation duties under British Forces in Austria. The 138th Infantry Brigade Headquarters were disbanded in 1946 and, being a 2nd Line Territorial formation, was not reformed in the 1947 reorganisation of the Territorial Army but its battalions seem to have survived. The 6th Battalion, Royal Lincolnshire Regiment (the Lincolns became a "Royal" regiment due to distinguished service in the war, with effect from 1946) appears to have existed until 1950 when it amalgamated with the 4th Battalion, of which the 6th was formed as a duplicate in 1939, creating the 4th/6th Battalion. The 6th Battalion, York and Lancaster Regiment survived until 1947 when it amalgamated with its parent unit, the Hallamshire Battalion of the same regiment, to create the 4th Battalion, as did the 2/4th King's Own Yorkshire Light Infantry which amalgamated with the 1/4th Battalion, to create the 4th Battalion, KOYLI.

== Recipients of the Victoria Cross ==
- 2nd Lieutenant John Cridlan Barrett, 1/5th Battalion, Leicestershire Regiment, Great War
- Captain John Brunt, 6th Battalion, Lincolnshire Regiment, Second World War
