= York and Lancaster Regiment =

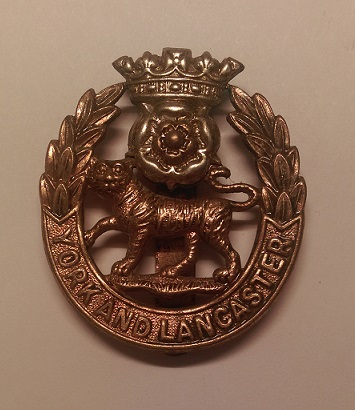
- Cap badge of the York and Lancaster Regiment.
- Active: 1881–1968
- Country: United Kingdom
- Branch: British Army
- Type: Infantry
- Role: Line infantry
- Size: 1–2 Regular battalions 2–6 Volunteer and Territorial battalions Up to 12 hostilities-only battalions
- Part of: Yorkshire Brigade
- Garrison/HQ: Pontefract Barracks, Pontefract
- Nicknames: The Tigers; Cat and Cabbage (Cap badge); Young and Lovelies
- Motto: Honi soit qui mal y pense
- March: Quick: The York and Lancaster, The Jockey of York; Slow: Regimental Slow March of the York and Lancaster
- Mascot: Cat (unofficial)

Commanders
- Colonel of the Regiment: Herbert Plumer

The York and Lancaster Regiment was a line infantry regiment of the British Army that existed from 1881 until 1968. The regiment was created in the Childers Reforms of 1881 by the amalgamation of the 65th (2nd Yorkshire, North Riding) Regiment of Foot and the 84th (York and Lancaster) Regiment of Foot. The regiment saw service in many small conflicts and both World War I and World War II until 1968, when the regiment chose to be disbanded rather than amalgamated with another regiment, one of only two infantry regiments in the British Army to do so, with the other being the Cameronians (Scottish Rifles).

== History ==
The regiment was formed on 1 July 1881 through the amalgamation of two regiments of foot and a militia regiment:

- 65th (2nd Yorkshire) Regiment
- 84th (York and Lancaster) Regiment
- 3rd West York Light Infantry Militia (two battalions)

Under the original scheme of amalgamation announced in March 1881 the title of the new regiment was to be The Hallamshire Regiment. This reflected the fact that the regimental district included an area of West Riding of Yorkshire known as Hallamshire. The proposed title was unpopular with the amalgamating units, who sought a more "suitable title... which at the same time would identify the regiment with the county (Yorkshire), which the word 'Hallamshire' entirely fails to do." Four different titles were proposed, and following a vote of the officers of all four battalions, the title York and Lancaster Regiment was chosen. The regiment inherited the title "York and Lancaster" from the 84th Foot to which it had been awarded in 1809. The 84th was one of the few Regiments of Foot lacking a county designation and the title was given in recognition of the fact that the unit had been raised in York in 1793, with a second battalion in Preston, Lancashire in 1808.

=== Sudan, 1884 ===
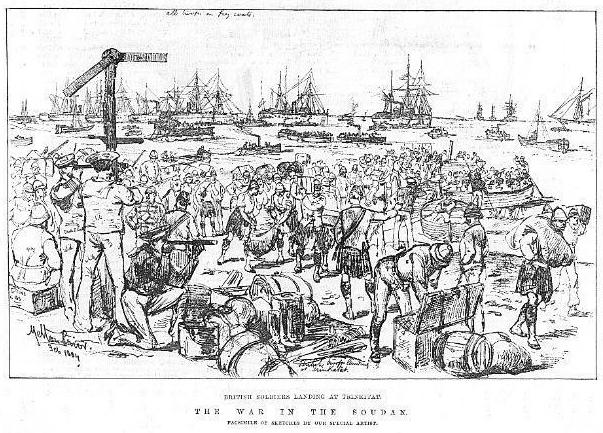
British soldiers landing at Trinkitat, February 1884 a sketch by Melton Prior

The 1st battalion of the new regiment had spent 11 years in India (as the 65th Reg) 1871–1882. They were moved to Aden to be held in reserve for the Egyptian Campaign. After 18 months, they shipped on the Serapis to Trinkitat, Sudan, arriving 28 February 1884. The next day they came under gun fire and made a bayonet charge, capturing two Krupp guns. Later that day seven were killed and 35 wounded at the Battle of El Teb. The 1st battalion was reported as 421 strong when at Souakim, 14 March, before losing 32 killed and 25 wounded. They embarked on the troopship HMS Jumna on 29 March, arriving at Dover on 22 April 1884.

=== Second Boer War ===
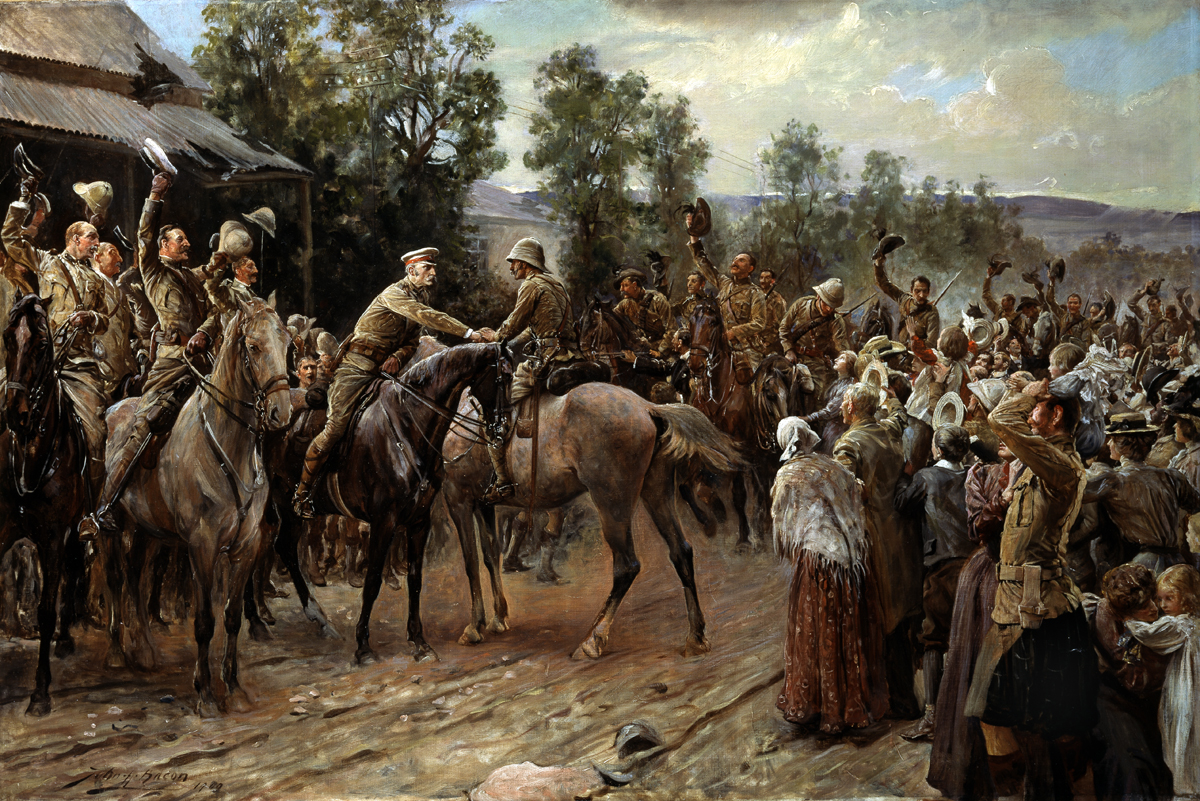
The Relief of Ladysmith. Sir George Stuart White greets Major Hubert Gough on 28 February. Painting by John Henry Frederick Bacon (1868–1914)

The 1st battalion embarked for South Africa as part of the reinforcements for the Second Boer War in late 1899. It took part in the Relief of Ladysmith.

=== Service in the Empire ===
Following the end of the war in South Africa in 1902, the 1st battalion was sent to British India, where it replaced the 2nd battalion in Mhow. The 2nd battalion returned home, for the first time since 1883.

In 1908, the Volunteers and Militia were reorganised nationally, with the former becoming the Territorial Force and the latter the Special Reserve; the regiment now had one Reserve and two Territorial battalions.

=== First World War ===
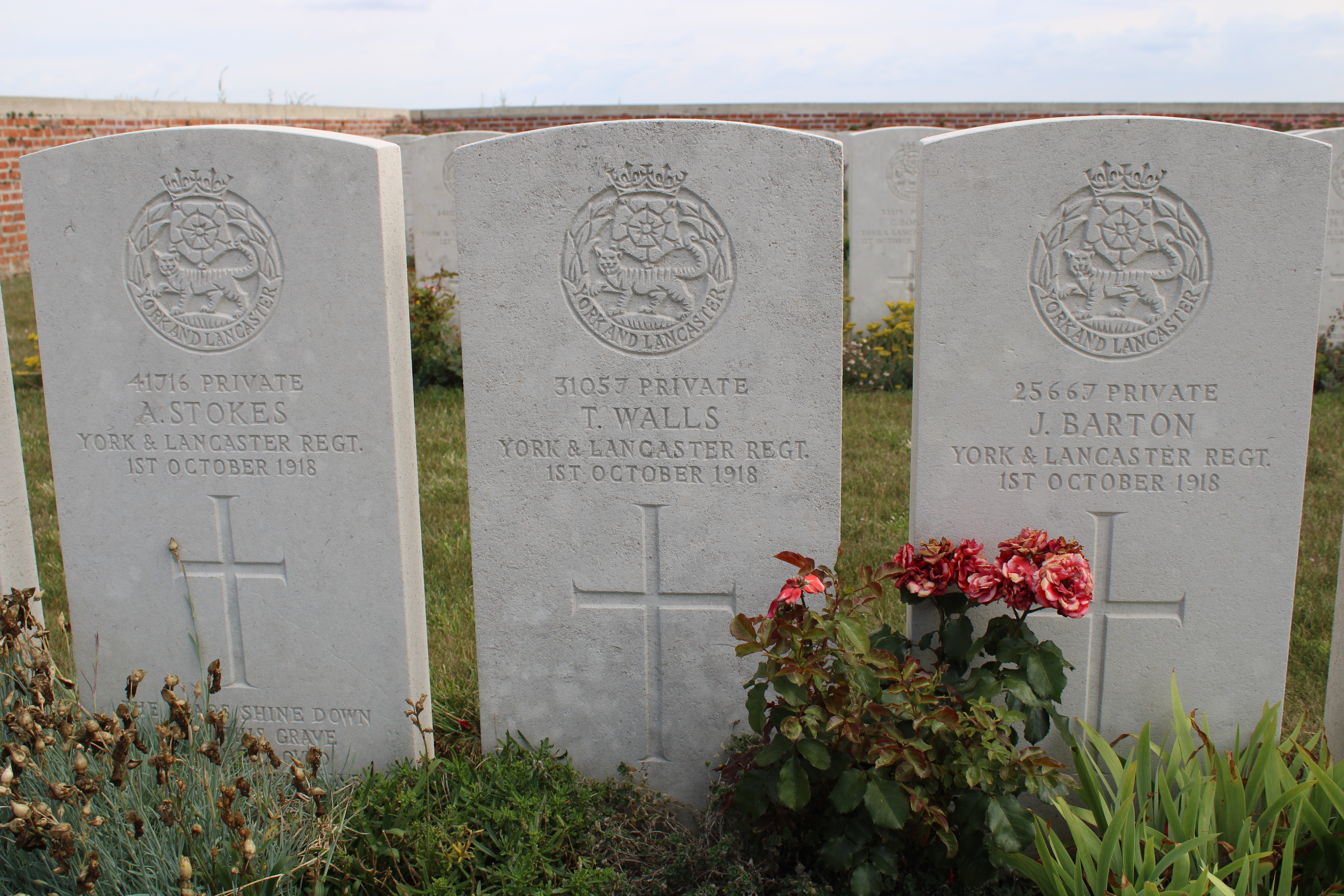
Graves of three soldiers of the York and Lancaster Regiment who died at Epinoy, France on 1 October 1918.

In total, 22 battalions of the regiment served during the Great War, losing 8,814 officers and men killed in action.

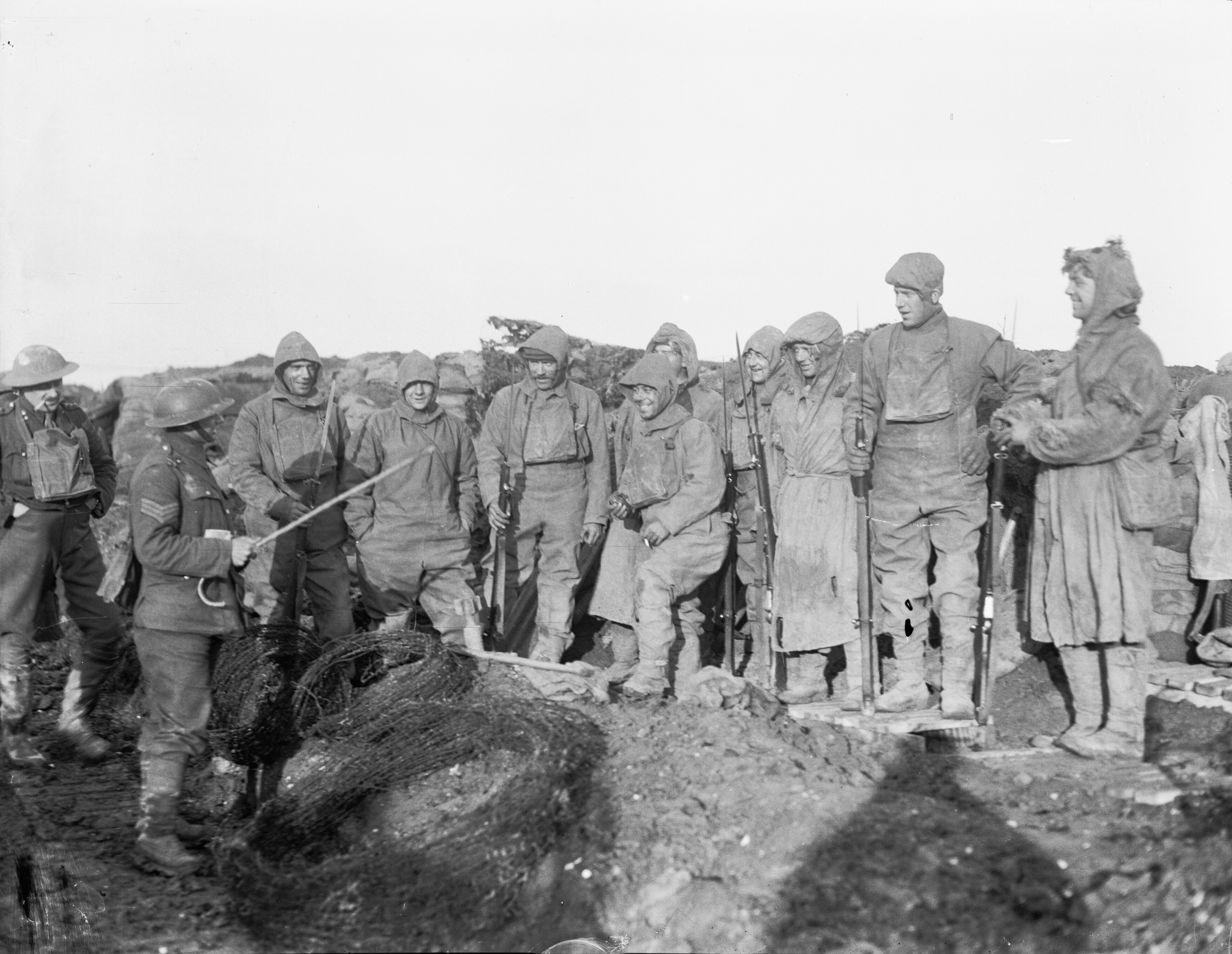
Men of the York and Lancaster Regiment receiving instructions in the trenches before starting out on a patrol near Roclincourt, France, 12 January 1918. Note their camouflaged outfits.

The 22 battalions consisted of the two regular battalions, the depot battalion, six Territorial Force battalions, nine Service, two Reserve, one Transport and one Labour battalion. Of these battalions, 17 saw service overseas.

During the Battle of the Somme, eight battalions of the Yorks and Lancs' went over the top on the first day, 1 July 1916, suffering huge casualties. Eleven battalions of the regiment fought during the Somme offensive.

==== Regular Army ====
The regular 1st Battalion returned from service in British India to be formed up as part of the 83rd Brigade in the 28th Division. The 28th Division consisted of regular battalions returning from overseas service and was shipped to France in January 1915. The 1st Battalion saw action in the Second Battle of Ypres and the Battle of Loos. The battalion was then shipped to the Balkans as part of the British Salonika Army where it would remain until the end of the war. While the battalion was still in France Private Samuel Harvey was awarded the York and Lancs' first Victoria Cross since the regiment's creation in 1881.

The 2nd Battalion was stationed in Ireland with the 16th Brigade when war broke out. The battalion arrived on the Western Front in September 1914 with the 6th Division as part of the original British Expeditionary Force. The 2nd Battalion fought its first battle at Radinghem south of Armentières during the Race to the Sea. The 2nd Battalion fought in most of the major battles of the war including the Battle of the Somme and spent the entire war serving in France and Flanders. Private John Caffrey, 2nd battalion, was awarded the Victoria Cross in 1915. Following the armistice of 11 November 1918 troops from the York's and Lancaster Regiment were involved in a mutinous riot at the Clipstone Camp, Nottinghamshire, following disquiet at the slow rate of being demobilised.

==== Territorial Force ====
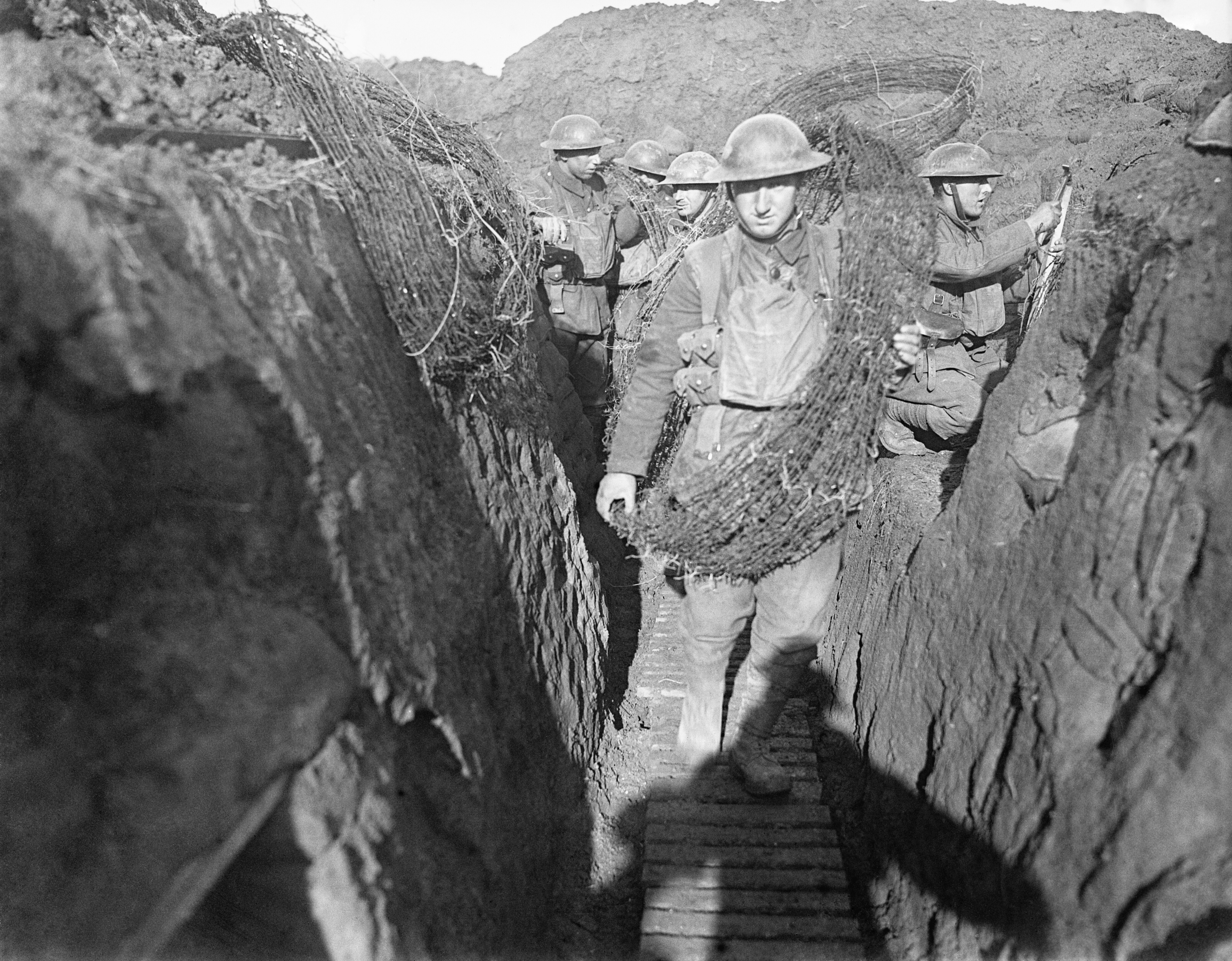
Men of the York and Lancaster Regiment, probably 2/4th Battalion, part of the 187th Brigade, take up wire for use by a night working party on the 62nd Division front between Oppy and Gavrelle, 13 January 1918.

The 1/4th (Hallamshire) Battalion and the 1/5th Battalion landed at Boulogne-sur-Mer as part of the 3rd West Riding Brigade in the West Riding Division in April 1915 for service on the Western Front.

The 2/4th (Hallamshire) Battalion and the 2/5th Battalion landed at Le Havre as part of the 187th Brigade in 62nd (2nd West Riding) Division in January 1917 also for service on the Western Front.

==== New Armies ====
The 6th (Service) Battalion landed at Suvla Bay in Gallipoli as part of the 32nd Brigade in the 11th (Northern) Division; the battalion was evacuated in December 1915 and moved to Egypt before moving on to France in July 1916 for service on the Western Front.

The 7th (Service) Battalion (Pioneers) landed at Boulogne-sur-Mer as pioneer battalion for the 17th (Northern) Division in July 1915 also for service on the Western Front.

The 8th and 9th (Service) battalions landed at Boulogne-sur-Mer as part of the 70th Brigade in the 23rd Division in August 1915 also for service on the Western Front and then moved to Italy in November 1917.

The 10th (Service) Battalion landed at Boulogne-sur-Mer as part of the 63rd Brigade in the 21st Division in September 1915 also for service on the Western Front.

The three Pals battalions, the 12th (Sheffield City) Battalion and the 13th and 14th Barnsley battalions, landed in France as part of the 94th Brigade in the 31st Division in March 1916 for service on the Western Front. They suffered particularly heavily during the Battle of the Somme.

=== Second World War ===
==== Regular Army ====
The 1st Battalion was part of the 15th Infantry Brigade of the 5th Infantry Division and was sent to France in October 1939, a month after the outbreak of the Second World War, where it served as part of the British Expeditionary Force (BEF). The battalion, with the rest of the 15th Brigade (which was temporarily detached from the 5th Division), was carried to and from Norway, where it fought briefly in the Norwegian Campaign in April 1940, by HMS Sheffield; this led to a bond of friendship between the regiment and the ship, and meant that, when the Sheffield was adopted by its namesake city, the regiment was awarded the freedom of Sheffield soon after. The battalion, after evacuation to the United Kingdom in May 1940, was sent to Scotland where the 15th Brigade was reunited with rest of the division, later being posted to Northern Ireland in March 1942. After leaving the United Kingdom in March 1942 and being shipped around most of the British Empire and many Middle Eastern countries, the battalion was finally sent to the Mediterranean, where it fought in the Allied invasion of Sicily in July/August 1943, followed in early September by the Allied invasion of Italy. They then fought in the Italian Campaign, fighting, most notably, in the First Battle of Monte Cassino in January 1944 and remained there holding their objectives gained during the battle, before being sent to the Anzio beachhead in March. The battalion, as in the aftermath of Monte Cassino, remained at Anzio until late May, where it took part in Operation Diadem, and in June was withdrawn from the front line, returning to the Middle East in July, where the battalion remained for the next seven months, resting and refitting after nearly a year of continuous action in Sicily and Italy. Landing briefly in Italy in February 1945, the battalion, with the rest of the 5th Division, transferred to Belgium soon afterwards, arriving there in March, to take part in the Western Allied invasion of Germany, where the battalion ended the war.

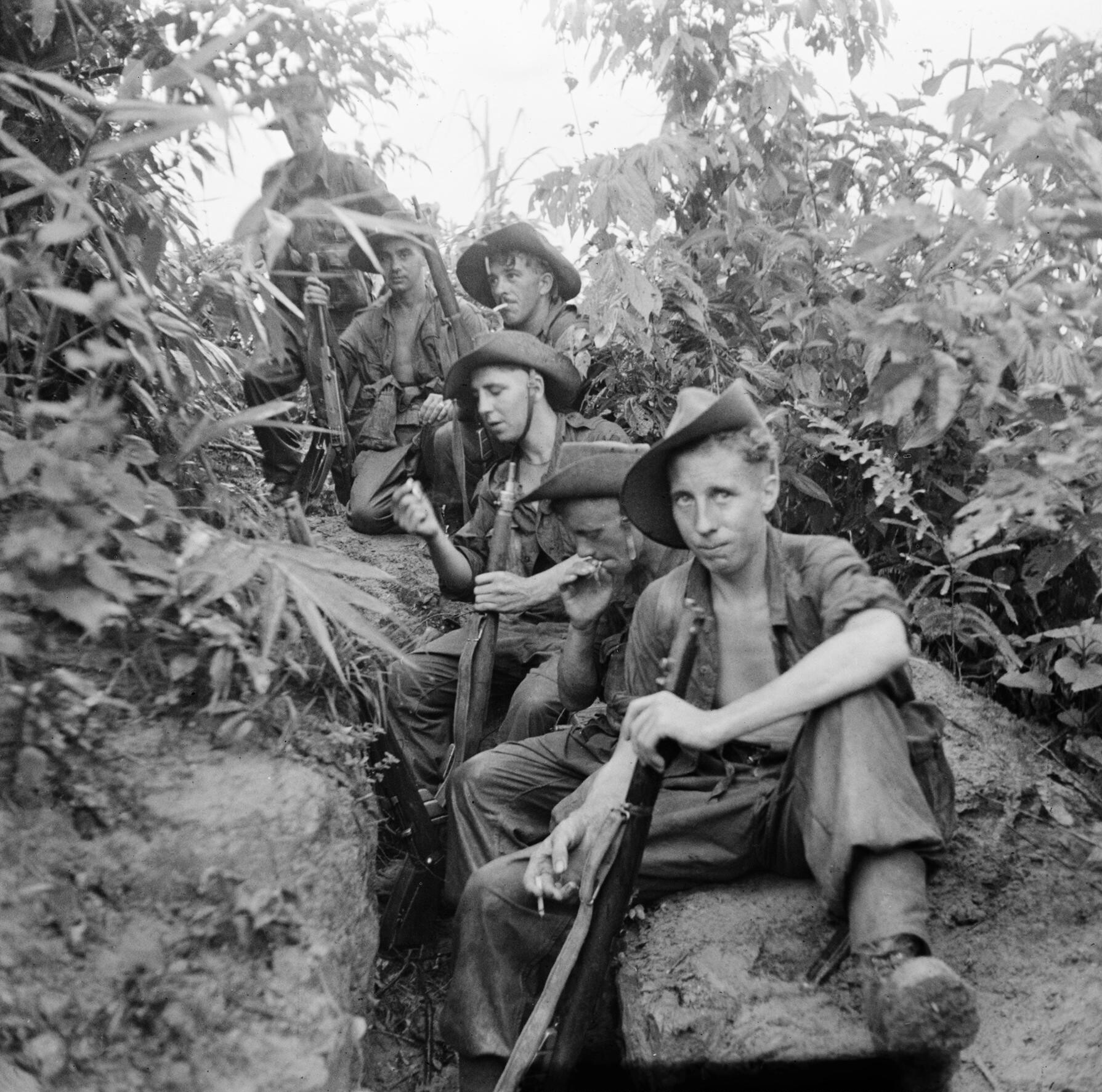
Men of the 2nd Battalion, rest while on patrol in the jungle of Burma, July 1944.

The 2nd Battalion (part of the 14th Infantry Brigade) was involved in the defence of Heraklion, during the Battle of Crete in 1941. Most of their casualties in this battle were suffered in the withdrawal by the Royal Navy which came under heavy air attack from the German Luftwaffe. On returning to Egypt, they became part of the 70th Infantry Division used in the breakout from Tobruk, where they suffered heavy casualties as one of the lead battalions. In 1942, they were transferred, along with the rest of the 70th Infantry Division, to India and Burma where they took part in the Second Chindit Campaign and the Arakan offensive toward the end of the war.

==== Territorial Army ====
The Hallamshire Battalion, was part of Mauriceforce (Norwegian Campaign) in Norway in April 1940. The battalion was part of the 146th Infantry Brigade, itself part of the 49th (West Riding) Infantry Division. The Hallamshires took part in the unsuccessful Namsos Campaign and were evacuated back to Britain by 5 May. The Hallamshires were sent to Iceland and the United Kingdom in April 1942, not seeing active service until the battalion was landed in Normandy soon after D-Day in June 1944 and fought its way through France, Belgium (where Corporal John Harper was awarded the regiment's fifth Victoria Cross), and into the Netherlands, where it was part of the bitter fighting that led to the eventual capture of Arnhem in April 1945.

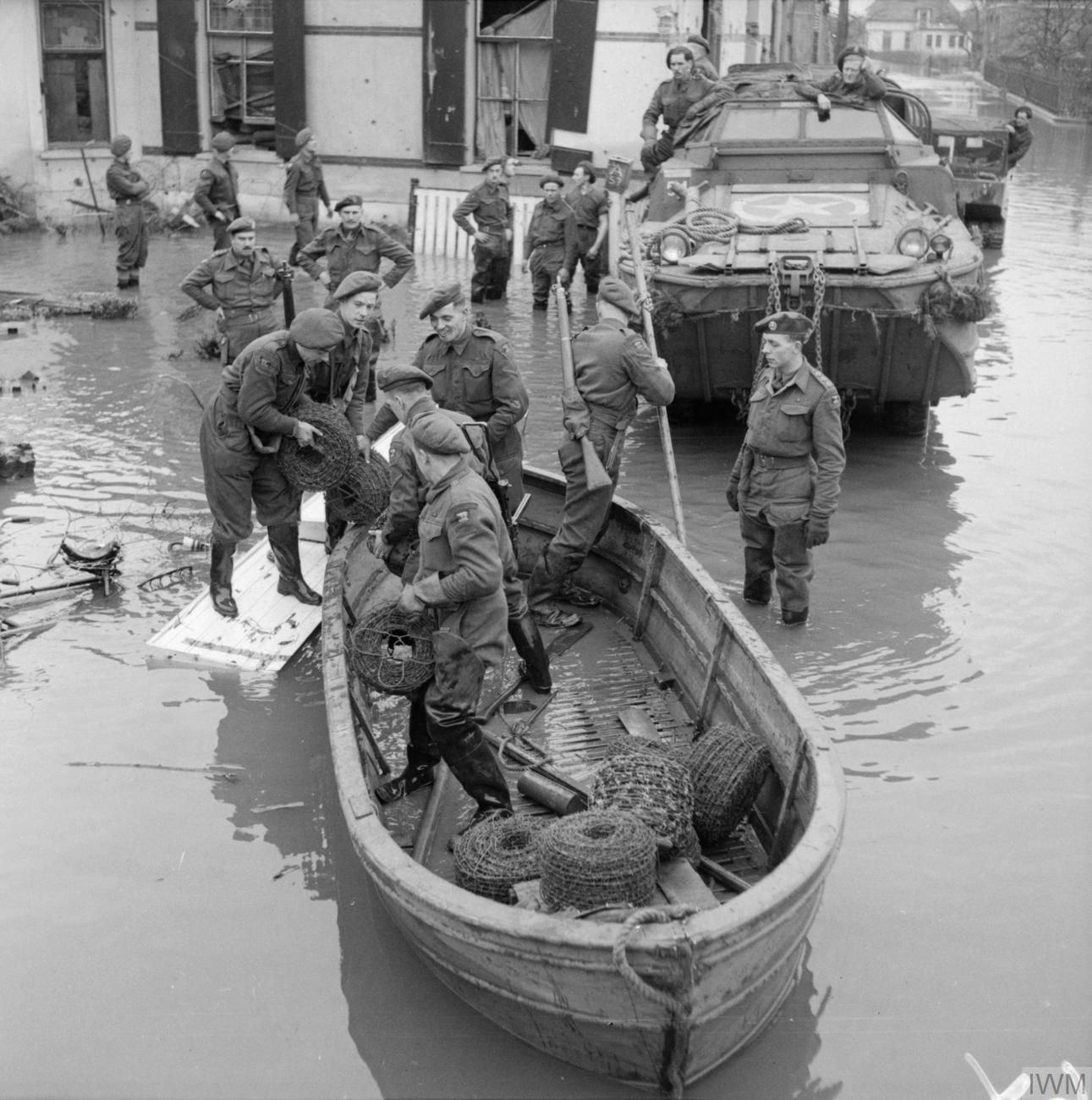
Troops from the Hallamshire Battalion, York and Lancaster Regiment unloading coils of barbed wire from a boat in the flooded village of Zetten, 2 March 1945.

The former 5th Battalion (Territorial Army), which had converted to anti-aircraft artillery in 1936, served in the North African Campaign in 1941, as the 67th (York and Lancaster) Heavy Anti-Aircraft Regiment, Royal Artillery, before being transferred to India and then Burma, where it was prominent at Imphal, and later at Mandalay. From October 1944 to January 1945, the regiment served as infantry due to the shortage of manpower in the British Army at the time.

The 6th Battalion was a 2nd Line Territorial duplicate of the 4th Battalion, formed in 1939 when the TA was doubled in size. The battalion, part of the 138th Infantry Brigade of the 46th Infantry Division, went to France, under Lieutenant Colonel George Symes, in April 1940, and the following month experienced heavy fighting in the St Omer-La Bassée area. Taking part in the Dunkirk evacuation, the battalion returned to England in June 1940 and remained there on anti-invasion duties for the next two-and-a-half years. In early 1943, the battalion, now under Lieutenant Colonel Douglas Kendrew, together with the rest of the 46th Division, was sent to French North Africa where it became part of the British First Army and fought in the Tunisian Campaign until it ended in mid-May, with the battalion capturing thousands of Axis soldiers. After spending three months resting, refitting and training, the battalion then, in early September 1943, took part in the Allied invasion of Italy, suffering very heavy casualties. The battalion, after helping in the liberation of Naples, later participated in the breaching the Volturno Line, and advanced up the spine of western Italy, fighting along the Winter Line, and in the First Battle of Monte Cassino. In March 1944, the battalion, after nearly six months of continuous action, was withdrawn to Egypt and later Palestine to rest and refit. Returning to Italy in July, the battalion fought on the Gothic Line, before, in December 1944, being sent to Greece and returning again to Italy in April 1945.

==== Hostilities-only ====
Meanwhile, the 7th Battalion, which was raised in 1940, was in India (from December 1942), but served mainly on the North-West Frontier, before being moved to Burma in 1945, too late to contribute to the defeat of the Japanese.

The 8th and 9th battalions, both raised in 1940, after being stationed in Northern Ireland with the 71st Brigade from 1940 to 1942, were both sent to India in 1942 where they joined the 25th Indian Infantry Division. The 8th Battalion joined the 51st Indian Infantry Brigade and the 9th Battalion the 53rd Indian Infantry Brigade. The two battalions took a significant part in the Arakan battles of 1942–1943 and in the battles for southern Burma in 1944 to 1945.

The 10th Battalion was converted to tanks in India, becoming the 150th Regiment, Royal Armoured Corps, in the 254th Indian Tank Brigade. The 150th Regiment used Lee tanks with which it fought at the Battles of Imphal, Kohima and Meiktila and on the advance to Rangoon (Operation Dracula).

=== Post Second World War ===
Following the Second World War, the regiment saw service around the world, including participation in the Suez Crisis of 1956. With the reorganisation of the army in 1968, the York and Lancaster Regiment was one of two infantry regiments that chose to be disbanded rather than amalgamated with another regiment, the other regiment being the Cameronians (Scottish Rifles). However, although the 1st Battalion was disbanded in 1968, with the Regimental HQ closing in 1987, the traditions of the regiment were continued through the descendants of the Hallamshire Battalion, which was constituted as two companies in the Yorkshire Volunteers.

On 6 June 2006, the platoon took its rightful place in the ORBAT of the newly formed 4th Battalion The Yorkshire Regiment, thus ensuring a continued and direct link, via the Territorial Army, with The York and Lancaster Regiment. Recognition of this link was further reinforced by a recent decision by the Yorkshire Regiment Association (YRA) to recognise all former members of the York and Lancaster Regiment as members of the YRA.

== Regimental museum ==
The York and Lancaster Regimental Museum is based at Clifton Park in Rotherham.

== Battle honours ==
The regiment's battle honours were as follows:

- combined battle honours of 65th Regiment and 84th Regiment^{1}, plus:
  - Guadeloupe 1759^{2}, Martinique 1794^{2}, Tel-el-Kebir, Egypt 1882 '84, Relief of Ladysmith, South Africa 1899–1902
  - The Great War [22 battalions]: Aisne 1914, Armentières 1914, Ypres 1915 '17 '18, Gravenstafel, St. Julien, Frezenberg, Bellewaarde, Hooge 1915, Loos, Somme 1916 '18, Albert 1916, Pozières, Flers-Courcelette, Morval, Thiepval, Le Transloy, Ancre Heights, Ancre 1916, Arras 1917 '18, Scarpe 1917 '18, Arleux, Oppy, Messines 1917 '18, Langemarck 1917, Menin Road, Polygon Wood, Broodseinde, Poelcappelle, Passchendaele, Cambrai 1917 '18, St. Quentin, Bapaume 1918, Lys, Hazebrouck, Bailleul, Kemmel, Scherpenberg, Marne 1918, Tardenois, Drocourt-Quéant, Hindenburg Line, Havrincourt, Épéhy, Canal du Nord, Selle, Valenciennes, Sambre, France and Flanders 1914–18, Piave, Vittorio Veneto, Italy 1917–18, Struma, Doiran 1917, Macedonia 1915–18, Suvla, Landing at Suvla, Scimitar Hill, Gallipoli 1915, Egypt 1916
  - The Second World War: Norway 1940, Odon, Fontenay Le Pesnil, Caen, La Vie Crossing, La Touques Crossing, Forêt de Bretonne, Le Havre, Antwerp-Turnhout Canal, Scheldt, Lower Maas, Arnhem 1945, North-West Europe 1940 '44–45, Tobruk 1941, Tobruk Sortie 1941, Mine de Sedjenane, Djebel Kournine, North Africa 1941 '43, Landing in Sicily, Simeto Bridgehead, Pursuit to Messina, Sicily 1943, Salerno, Vietri Pass, Capture of Naples, Cava di Terreni, Volturno Crossing, Monte Camino, Calabritto, Colle Cedro, Garigliano Crossing, Minturno, Monte Tuga, Anzio, Advance to Tiber, Gothic Line, Coriano, San Clemente, Gemmano Ridge, Carpineta, Lamone Crossing, Defence of Lamone Bridgehead, Rimini Line, San Marino, Italy 1943–45, Crete, Heraklion, Middle East 1941, North Arakan, Maungdaw, Rangoon Road, Toungoo, Arakan Beaches, Chindits 1944, Burma 1943–45

1. the honour "India" of the 84th Regt was modified to "India 1796–1819" in 1912 to differentiate it from the "India" Tiger badge of the 65th Regt

2. awarded 1909 for services of 65th Regiment

== Victoria Cross awards ==
- Private Samuel Harvey, 1st Battalion (29 September 1915)
- Private John Caffrey, 2nd Battalion (16 November 1915)
- Sergeant Frederick Charles Riggs, 6th (Service) Battalion (1 October 1918)
- Sergeant John Brunton Daykins, 2/4th Battalion (20 October 1918)
- Corporal John William Harper, Hallamshire Battalion (29 September 1944)

== Affiliations ==
- Les Fusiliers Mont-Royal − 1968
- The Wellington Regiment (City of Wellington's Own) - 1913–1964
- 7th Battalion (Hawke's Bay – City of Wellington's Own), Royal New Zealand Infantry Regiment - 1964–1968
- 7th Battalion, Royal Malay Regiment − 1968

== See also ==
- List of York and Lancaster Regiment battalions
- British 5th Infantry Division
- 49th (West Riding) Infantry Division
- British 70th Infantry Division

== Sources ==
- Forty, George (1998). British Army Handbook 1939–1945. Stoud: Sutton Publishing. ISBN 978-0753703328.
- Joslen, H. F. (2003) [1960]. Orders of Battle: Second World War, 1939–1945. Uckfield, East Sussex: Naval and Military Press. ISBN 978-1-84342-474-1.
