= Samuel Harvey (VC) =

Recipient of the Victoria Cross

- Born: 17 September 1881; Basford, Nottingham, England
- Died: 23 September 1960 (aged 79); Stowmarket, Suffolk, England
- Burial place: Ipswich Old Cemetery
- Military career
- Allegiance: United Kingdom
- Branch: British Army
- Rank: Private
- Units: The York and Lancaster Regiment
- Conflicts: World War I
- Awards: Victoria Cross; Légion d'honneur (5th class); Cross of the Order of St George (Russia)

Samuel Harvey VC (17 September 1881 – 23 September 1960) was an English recipient of the Victoria Cross, the highest and most prestigious award for gallantry in the face of the enemy that can be awarded to British and Commonwealth forces.

== Details ==
He was 34 years old and a private in the 1st Battalion, York and Lancaster Regiment, British Army during the First World War when the following deed took place for which he was awarded the VC.

On 29 September 1915 in the "Big Willie" Trench near the Hohenzollern Redoubt, France, during a heavy bombing (hand grenade) attack, more bombs were urgently required and Private Harvey volunteered to fetch them. The communication trench was blocked with wounded and reinforcements and he went backwards and forwards across open ground under intense fire and succeeded in bringing up 30 boxes before he was wounded in the head. It was largely owing to his cool bravery in supplying the bombs that the enemy was eventually driven back.

Harvey received the French Legion of Honour (5th Class) and the Cross of St. George (Russia). He received little recognition in Britain after the war and towards the end of his life resided in the Salvation Army Citadel on Woodbridge Road in Ipswich. He also slept rough outside the Town Hall or in Wolves Wood, near Hadleigh, Suffolk.

He died in Suffolk on 23 September 1960.

Samuel Harvey was buried in Old Ipswich Cemetery on 26 September 1960 in Grave – X-21-3 (Section, Division, Grave no). In March 2014 he was honoured by the planting of a tree near his grave and another tree at Sprites Primary School in Ipswich.
