= John William Harper =

British soldier who was awarded the Victoria Cross

- Born: 6 August 1916; Hatfield, West Riding of Yorkshire, England
- Died: 29 September 1944 (aged 28); Merksplas, Belgium
- Burial place: Leopoldsburg War Cemetery, Belgium; 51°6′44.17″N 5°16′6.47″E
- Military career
- Allegiance: United Kingdom
- Branch: British Army
- Service years: 1939–1944
- Rank: Corporal
- Service number: 4751678
- Units: York and Lancaster Regiment
- Conflicts: World War II: Western Front; Western Allied invasion of Belgium †
- Awards: Victoria Cross

Corporal John William Harper VC (6 August 1916 – 29 September 1944) was a British Army soldier and an English recipient of the Victoria Cross (VC), the highest and most prestigious award for gallantry in the face of the enemy that can be awarded to British and Commonwealth forces.

== Birth ==
John William Harper was born in Hatfield, Doncaster, West Riding of Yorkshire on 6 August 1916 to George Ernest Harper and his wife, Florence Parkin.

== Details ==
Harper was 28 years old, and a corporal in the 4th Battalion, York and Lancaster Regiment, British Army during the Second World War when the following deed took place for which he was awarded the VC.

On 29 September 1944 during an assault on the Depot de Mendicite, Merksplas, Belgium, Corporal Harper led his section across 300 yards of completely exposed ground, with utter disregard for the hail of mortar bombs and small arms fire from the enemy. He was killed in the action, but the subsequent capture of the position was largely due to his self-sacrifice.

War Office, 2nd January, 1943.

The KING has been graciously pleased to approve the posthumous award of the VICTORIA CROSS to: —

No. 4751678 Corporal John William Harper, The York and Lancaster Regiment (Doncaster).

In North-West Europe, on 29th September, 1944, the Hallamshire Battalion of the York and Lancaster Regiment attacked the Depot de Mendicite, a natural defensive position surrounded by an earthen wall, and then a dyke, strongly held by the enemy. Corporal Harper was commanding the leading section in the assault. The enemy were well dug in and had a perfect field of fire across 300 yards of completely flat and exposed country. With superb disregard for the hail of mortar bombs and small arms fire which the enemy brought to bear on this open ground, Corporal Harper led his section straight up to the wall and killed or captured the enemy holding the near side. During this operation the platoon commander was seriously wounded and Corporal Harper took over control of the platoon. As the enemy on the far side of the wall were now throwing grenades over the top, Corporal Harper climbed over the wall alone, throwing grenades, and in the face of heavy, close range small arms fire, personally routed the Germans directly opposing him. He took four prisoners and shot several of the remainder of the enemy as they fled. Still completely ignoring the heavy spandau and mortar fire, which was sweeping the area, once again he crossed the wall alone to find out whether it was possible for his platoon to wade the dyke which lay beyond. He found the dyke too deep and wide to cross, and once again he came back over the wall and received orders to try and establish his platoon on the enemy side of it. For the third time he climbed over alone, found some empty German weapon pits, and providing the covering fire urged and encouraged his section to scale the wall and dash for cover. By this action he was able to bring down sufficient covering fire to enable the rest of the company to cross the open ground and surmount the wall for the loss of only one man. Corporal Harper then left his platoon in charge of his senior section commander and walked alone along the banks of the dyke, in the face of heavy spandau fire, to find a crossing place. Eventually he made contact with the battalion attacking on his right, and found that they had located a ford. Back he came across the open ground, and, whilst directing his company commander to the ford, he was struck by a bullet which fatally wounded him and he died on the bank of the dyke. The success of the battalion in driving the enemy from the wall and back across the dyke must be largely ascribed to the superb self sacrifice and inspiring gallantry of Corporal Harper. His magnificent courage, fearlessness and devotion to duty throughout the battle set a splendid example to his men and had a decisive effect on the course of the operations

== The medal ==
His Victoria Cross is held at The York & Lancaster Regiment Museum in Rotherham, South Yorkshire, England.

== Memorials ==
His remains now lie at the War Cemetery at Leopoldsburg, near Limburg, Belgium, Plot No.5, Row B, Grave No.15. 51°6′44.17″N 5°16′6.47″E A stained glass window, created by Frans Pelgrims and donated by the town of Merksplas (Belgium) as sign of an everlasting gratitude and respect, depicting Corporal Harper and the area of his final battle are shown in Hatfield St Lawrence Church.

External image
- Corporal Harper's name inscribed on the Hatfield Cemetery War Memorial

His name is inscribed on the Hatfield Cemetery War Memorial.

== Bibliography ==
- British VCs of World War 2 (John Laffin, 1997)
- Monuments to Courage (David Harvey, 1999)
- The Register of the Victoria Cross (This England, 1997)
- Whitworth, Alan (2012). Yorkshire VCs. Pen and Sword Books. ISBN 978-1-84884-778-1.
