= Hallamshire Battalion =

The Hallamshire Battalion 4th (Hallamshire) Battalion, York and Lancaster Regiment
- Active: 30 September 1859–1 April 1971
- Country: United Kingdom
- Branch: Volunteer Force/Territorial Force/Territorial Army
- Type: Infantry
- Size: Battalion
- Part of: York and Lancaster Regiment
- Garrison/HQ: Endcliffe Hall, Sheffield
- Engagements: First World War; Second World War

The Hallamshire Battalion was an infantry battalion of the York and Lancaster Regiment, part of the British Army in existence from 1859 until 1971.

== History ==
=== Formation and early history ===
An invasion scare in 1859 led to the emergence of the Volunteer Movement, and Rifle Volunteer Corps (RVCs) began to be organised throughout Great Britain. On 30 September 1859 the 2nd, 3rd and 4th Yorkshire West Riding RVCs were formed at Sheffield, and on 22 December that year they were grouped into a battalion as the Hallamshire RVC (officially the 2nd (Hallamshire) Yorkshire West Riding RVC from 24 February 1860). The title Hallamshire came from the ancient lordship of West Riding that comprised the parishes of Sheffield, Ecclesfield and Bradfield. In 1862 the Hallamshire Rifles were presented with Colours. In 1881 with the reorganisation of the British Army, during the Cardwell Reforms, the unit became a volunteer battalion for the York and Lancaster Regiment and was renamed the 1st (Hallamshire) Volunteer Battalion in February 1883.

=== Second Boer War ===
The Hallamshires (in common with other Volunteer units) raised a second "active service" battalion. They were awarded the battle honour South Africa 1900-1902. In 1908 they were redesignated as the 4th (Territorial) Battalion. A year later it regained its title becoming 4th (Hallamshire) Battalion.

=== First World War ===
==== 1/4th (Hallamshire) Battalion ====
Upon the outbreak of the First World War in August 1914, most men of the battalion volunteered for Imperial Service (as, due to the Territorial and Reserve Forces Act 1907, members of the Territorial Force were not liable for overseas service without their consent), with the men who, for various reasons, were unwilling or unable being posted to the 2/4th Battalion, with the original Hallamshire Battalion being redesignated the 1/4th Battalion. After months of training, in April 1915 the battalion was moved to the Western Front, where it remained for the rest of the war. The battalion was still part of the 3rd West Riding Brigade of the West Riding Division, which in May became the 148th (3rd West Riding) Brigade and 49th (West Riding) Division, respectively, and was sent to the Ypres Salient by June. Over the next six months the battalion lost 94 officers and men killed and 401 injured in the attritional war of the trenches.

After a period of rest in Calais they moved to the Somme. On the first day of the Battle of the Somme, 1 July 1916, the battalion was part of the follow-up assault wave. During the next three months of the campaign the Hallamshires lost 27 officers and 750 soldiers killed and wounded.

During the rest of the war the Hallamshires suffered many more casualties including 288 in the first use of Mustard Gas at Nieuwpoort in July 1917. In the final Allied Advance to Victory, more commonly known as the Hundred Days Offensive, the Hallamshires were ordered on 13 October 1918 to reach the line of the river Selle which was supposedly undefended on the western bank. They advanced across open ground without artillery support to find strongly defended enemy positions. They achieved their objective but with only 4 officers and 240 men present of the 20 officers and 600 men who had started the advance. The war came to an end just under a month later, due to the Armistice with Germany.

==== 2/4th (Hallamshire) Battalion ====
The 2/4th (Hallamshire) Battalion was formed at Sheffield on 21 September 1914, composed mainly of officers and men who, for various reasons, had chosen not to volunteer for Imperial Service. In March 1915 the battalion became part of the 187th (2/3rd West Riding) Brigade of the 62nd (2nd West Riding) Division. The battalion's initial role was to supply drafts of replacements to the 1/4th Battalion, which it did throughout most of 1915 and 1916. However, the introduction of conscription in early 1916 saw the battalion mobilised as an active service unit, and, after training, the battalion was sent to the Western Front in January 1917, landing at the French port of Le Havre soon after.

==== 3/4th (Hallamshire) Battalion ====
The 3/4th (Hallamshire) Battalion was formed in March 1915, with the same initial role of the 2/4th Battalion, of supplying drafts of replacements to the 1/4th and 2/4th Battalions, and moved to Clipstone, Nottinghamshire. In April 1916 the battalion was redesignated as the 4th Reserve Battalion and in September absorbed the 5th Reserve Battalion as part of the West Riding Reserve Brigade. In October 1917 the battalion moved to Rugeley, Staffordshire, later Woodbridge, Suffolk and finally Southend-on-Sea, Essex, where they were when the war ended.

=== Between the wars ===
All three battalions were disbanded after the war in 1919. The Territorial Force was reformed on 7 February 1920, and in 1921 was reorganised as the Territorial Army (TA) and the original Hallamshire Battalion was, in 1924, the number was dropped by order of King George V in recognition of their war service and the battalion was known as simply The Hallamshire Battalion, Yorks and Lancs.

=== Second World War ===
==== Hallamshire Battalion ====
The Hallamshire Battalion saw action in World War II, and would serve with the 49th (West Riding) Infantry Division throughout the war, as it had in World War I. The battalion and most of the division first saw action as part of the ill-fated Norwegian Campaign in April 1940. The battalion arrived with most of the 146th Infantry Brigade, although they were poorly trained and equipped for the task being assigned to them. They were ashore for twelve days, seeing limited action and losing their only casualties on the journey home when one of their transports was sunk.

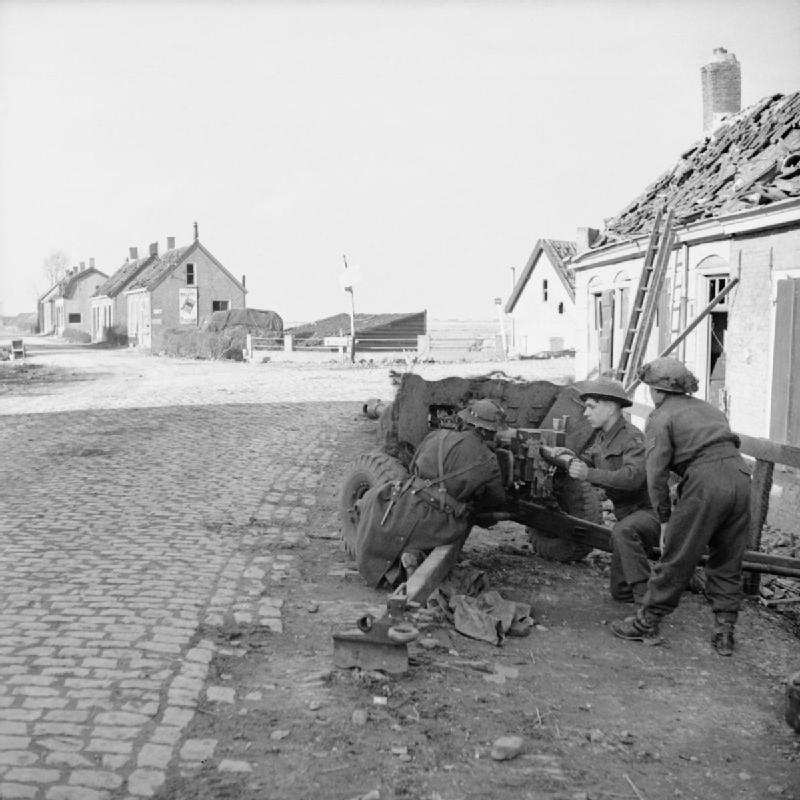
Men of the Hallamshire Battalion manning a 6-pounder anti-tank gun, Holland, November 1944.

The battalion spent the next two years "defending" Iceland and training as Alpine troops before returning to Scotland for garrison duties and to prepare for the invasion of North West Europe. The Hallamshires landed in France on D+3, 9 June 1944, three days after the initial invasion on D-Day, and moved into the front line four days later. Twelve days after landing the Hallamshires were involved in the attack on Fontenay-le-Pesnel (Operation Martlet) against the 26th SS Panzer Grenadier Regiment, 12th SS Panzer Division. The attack was successful but at the expense of 123 members of the battalion killed or wounded. To this day, former members of the battalion at that time still celebrate the victory as the Fontenay Club.

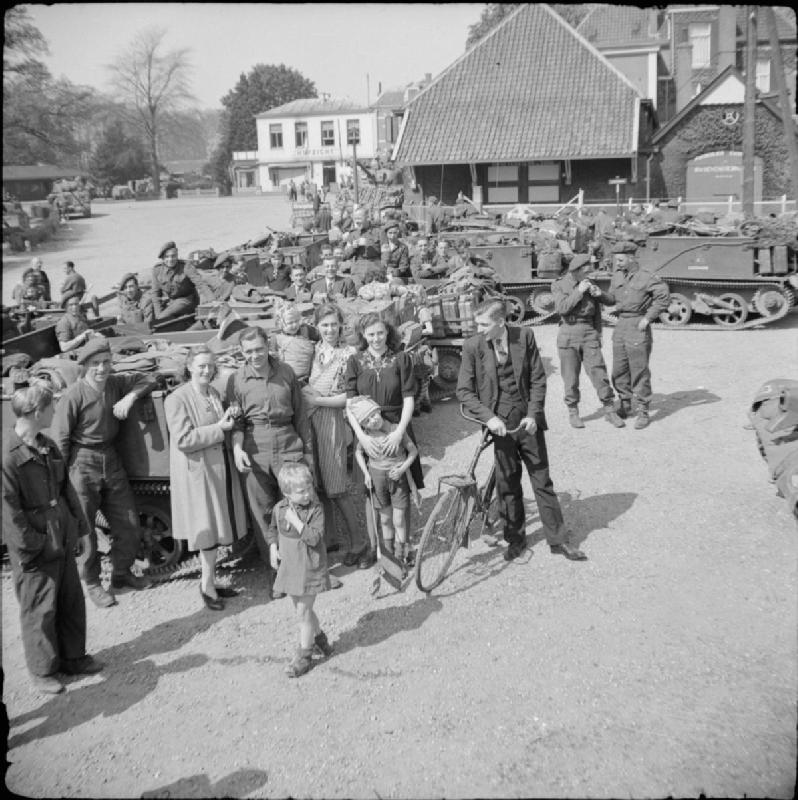
Men of the Hallamshire Battalion with civilians, Holland, April 1945.

The battalion was involved in the capture of the docks at Le Havre before the Germans could destroy the vital installations. Here they captured 1,005 prisoners, three Dornier flying boats and a submarine. In September, the Hallamshires crossed the Antwerp-Turnhout canal and for his part in a subsequent action, Corporal John William Harper was posthumously awarded the Victoria Cross for his heroism. During the winter months, the battalion served in the Nijmegen salient and participated in the liberation of Arnhem in April 1945, their final action of the war. Eleven months had seen the battalion suffer 158 officers and other ranks killed and 689 wounded or missing.

==== 6th Battalion ====
The 6th Battalion, York and Lancaster Regiment was formed as a second-line TA duplicate of the Hallamshire Battalion in August 1939, containing a number of former members of the original Hallamshires, although the 6th Battalion did not include the 'Hallamshire' in its title. The battalion was created upon the doubling of the TA in March 1939 due to the increasing possibility of war with Germany. The battalion was part of the 138th Infantry Brigade of the 46th Infantry Division and, upon the declaration of war in September 1939, spent much of its early existence in England guarding vulnerable points. In April 1940 the battalion went to France, and the following month experienced heavy fighting in the St Omer-La Bassée area. Taking part in the Dunkirk evacuation, the battalion returned to England in June 1940 and remained there on anti-invasion duties for the next two-and-a-half years.

In early 1943 the battalion, now commanded by Lieutenant Colonel Douglas Kendrew, together with the rest of the 46th Division, was sent to French North Africa where it became part of the British First Army and fought in the Tunisian Campaign, notable in the final stages of the Battle of Kasserine Pass in late February, until the campaign ended in mid-May, with the battalion capturing thousands of Axis soldiers.

After spending three months resting, refitting and training, the battalion then, in early September 1943, took part in the Allied invasion of Italy, suffering very heavy casualties. The battalion, after helping in the liberation of Naples, later participated in the breaching the Volturno Line, and advanced up the spine of western Italy, fighting along the Bernhardt and Winter Lines, and in the First Battle of Monte Cassino in January 1944. In March 1944, the battalion, after nearly six months of continuous action, was withdrawn to Egypt and later Palestine to rest and refit, after suffering very heavy losses. Returning to Italy in July the battalion fought on the Gothic Line, before, in December 1944, being sent to Greece and returning again to Italy in April 1945. However, the battalion took no part in Operation Grapeshot, the final offensive of the Italian Campaign, and instead moved into Austria for occupation duties in May.

=== Postwar ===
The Hallamshire Battalion remained in Germany after the war, returning home in 1946, when, after merging with the 6th Battalion, it was disbanded, only to be reformed in 1947. In 1950 the battalion was converted into a motorised infantry role. The 6th Battalion was sent to Austria after the war, where it remained until 1946 before returning to the United Kingdom the same year where it merged with the original Hallamshire Battalion.

The Hallamshire (Territorial) Battalion, reformed in the Territorial and Army Volunteer Reserve (TAVR) on 1 April 1967, was disbanded on 1 April 1971 to form D (Hallamshire) Company in 3rd Battalion, Yorkshire Volunteers.
