= Otley Road drill hall, Skipton =

Building in North Yorkshire, England

Otley Road drill hall
- Skipton
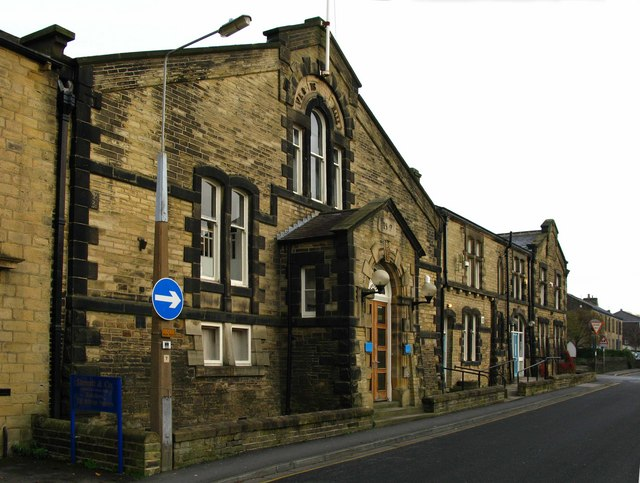
- Otley Road drill hall

Site information
- Type: Drill hall

Location
- Location in North Yorkshire
- Coordinates: 53.96183°N 2.01292°W

Site history
- Built: 1892
- Built for: War Office
- In use: 1892–1967

The Otley Road drill hall, sometimes known as Wellington House, is a former military installation in Skipton, North Yorkshire, England.

== History ==
The building was designed as the headquarters of the 3rd Volunteer Battalion, The Duke of Wellington's Regiment and was completed in 1892. This unit evolved to become the 6th Battalion, The Duke of Wellington's Regiment in 1908. The battalion was mobilised at the drill hall in August 1914 before being deployed to the Western Front.

After the Second World War, the battalion converted to become the 673rd Light Anti-Aircraft Regiment, Royal Artillery (The Duke of Wellington's Regiment). It then amalgamated with the 382nd Medium Regiment, Royal Artillery (Duke of Wellington's Regiment) in 1955, a unit which converted back to form the West Riding Battalion, The Duke of Wellington's Regiment (West Riding) at the St Paul's Street drill hall Huddersfield in 1961. After the defence cut backs in 1967, the Otley Road drill hall was decommissioned and then stood vacant for many years before being converted for commercial use as an architectural practice.
