= William Mundell =

William Mundell may refer to:

- William D. Mundell (1912–1997), American poet
- William Richard Mundell, British brigadier
- Bill Mundell, American politician
