= Arthur Burns (police officer) =

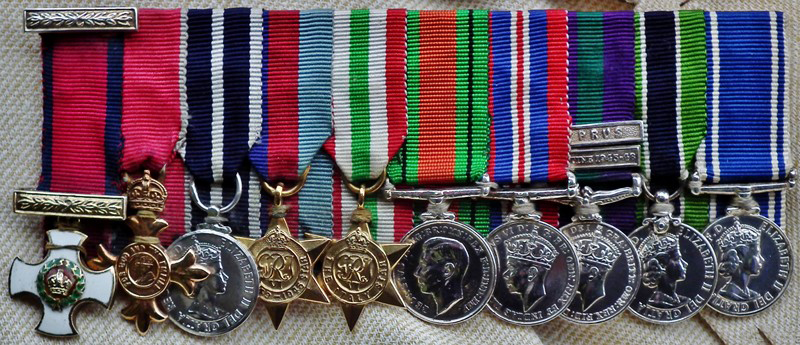
Captain Burns Medal Bar

Arthur "Robbie" Burns (18 November 1917 – June 2008) was awarded the DSO for his service during the Second World War fighting in Italy in 1944, and later had a distinguished career in the British Colonial Office and the English police. He served throughout the Italian campaign as a subaltern and later as a captain. He was wounded twice, fighting in the Anzio beachhead. He was later posted to the Middle East. In 1946, after serving in the British Palestine Mandate, he returned to the police service in his native Derbyshire.

== Personal ==
Arthur Burns was born on 18 November 1917 at Darley Abbey, Derbyshire, and educated at Kedleston Road School, where he was the school swimming champion. He played soccer for Derby Boys and rugby for Derby Rugby Football Club, before going to the local technical college.

== Police background ==
Burns joined the police in 1939, continuing a family tradition which had been started by his great-grandfather in 1840. After two years, during the Second World War, he volunteered for service in the British Army, being commissioned as an officer, becoming a 2nd lieutenant, and did his training in Scotland, where he acquired the nickname "Robbie". The family tradition ended when his daughter, Lynne Burns, retired from the Police Force, as a Ch Insp in the Derbyshire Constabulary in 1996.

== Military service ==
Burns enlisted in the British Army in 1942, initially as a private, into the Green Howards. On completion of his officer training he was commissioned into the 1st Battalion, Duke of Wellington's Regiment (1DWR). The battalion was part of the 3rd Infantry Brigade, alongside 2nd Sherwood Foresters and 1st King's Shropshire Light Infantry, part of the 1st Infantry Division, then commanded by Major General Walter Clutterbuck. In late February 1943, the division was sent to the Mediterranean theatre, arriving there the following month, where it saw action in the final stages of the Tunisian Campaign until it came to an end, with almost 250,000 Axis troops surrendering, in mid-May.

=== Italy ===
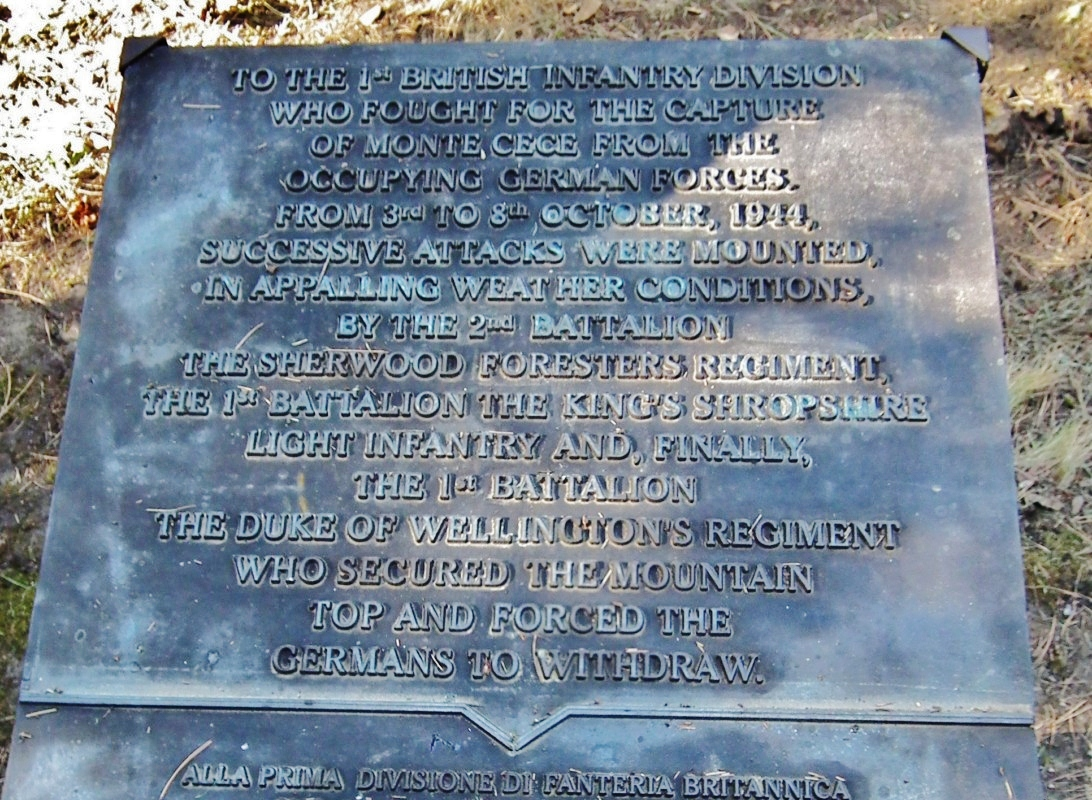
Memorial Plaque on summit of Monte Cece (Monte Ceco), near Palazzuolo sul Senio.

The division then, after participating in Operation Corkscrew in June, rested and retrained in North Africa until December when it was sent to Italy, where the campaign there had begun to bog down. The division then took part in the Anzio landings the following month, and during the fighting in the Anzio beachhead in the next few weeks Burns was twice wounded

In October 1944 the 1st Battalion, Duke of Wellington's Regiment was ordered to attack 'Monte Ceco' (Monte Cece), near Palazzuolo sul Senio, north-east of Florence after two repulsed attacks by the 2nd Foresters and the 1st KSLI. The mountain was strategically important having total command of 'Arrow Route', which was an important route north for the Allied advance.

1DWR began an assault on 6 October. During the night the attack was stopped by the CO Lt Col Sheil, and 'C' Company withdrew under heavy fire. 'A' Coy remained clinging to its position near the top. Lt Col Sheil visited Burns, who had observed that the Germans were least alert in the early afternoon. Sheil agreed with Burns suggestion that this would be the best time to attack the Germans. A second attack took place at about 15:30 on 8 October. 'C' Company led the advance with 'A' Company in close support. 'C' Company was held up by heavy machine-gun and mortar fire on the reverse slope of the preceding ridge and Sheil was ordered to get 'A' company through. Whilst Burns and 'C' Company's commander, Captain Peter Hassle, were assessing the situation from the exposed ridge top they were joined by Lt Col Sheil. A decision was made to have 'B' Company lead the attack and have 'A' company move through them onto the crest. A burst of Spandau fire opened up on the three officers and instantly killed Lt Col Sheil and wounded Captain Hassle in the arm. Burns then took command of both 'A' and 'C' Companies and after some hurried re-consolidation the attack continued. Burns personally led two platoons in an attack on two machine gun positions on the crest. Under intense fire they took control of the ridge, wiping out the machine-gun posts in the attack. The enemy counter-attacked twice through the night of 8–9 October, but were repulsed with heavy casualties and withdrew to pre-prepared positions further north. Following the capture of Monte Cece the award of a DSO was conferred on Captain Burns. Private Richard Henry Burton, a member of Burns's company, was awarded the Victoria Cross, for gallantry, in that same action.

Captain Burns citation in the December supplement to the London Gazette read:

For outstanding leadership and personal bravery in the face of strong enemy opposition during the attack and capture of Monte Cece on 8th and 9th October, 1944. The capture of the Monte Cece feature was vital to the advance as the feature was strongly held by the enemy and dominated forward company positions and the main axis of advance. This feature was 759 metres high with sheer slopes near the crest. It rained throughout the 8th and night 8th-9th October – conditions were well nigh impossible over ground which at the best of times was precipitous and difficult. Throughout the operation Capt. Burns led his men with courage and cheerfulness. He took every opportunity to wipe out known enemy resistance. He inspired his men with his personal courage in the face of the enemy. It was this officer's leadership and his initiative in taking control when his commanding officer was killed, together with his total disregard for personal safety which undoubtedly inspired the men during the attack and capture of the objective, which was essential for the successful continuation of the battle.

Burns served with 1DWR in Palestine during the Palestine Emergency after the war. On demobilisation, he returned to Derby as a constable, until his DSO ribbon was spotted by the Chief Constable. He was then promoted rapidly to command the Derby CID.

== Post World War II police career ==
In 1956 he was hand picked to the Colonial Office for two years' duty in Cyprus as an Assistant Commissioner of Police during the EOKA campaign. He was awarded a Colonial Police Medal at the end of his tour. He served as Deputy Chief Constable of Norwich City, and later in the same position in Essex. He subsequently became Chief Constable of Suffolk.

=== Queens Police Medal ===
He was awarded the Queen's Police Medal in 1975 and was appointed OBE the following year.

After retiring on 30 June 1976 he settled at Duffield, Derbyshire. He died in June 2008, at the age of 90. A widower, he was survived by his daughter Lynne.

== Honours ==

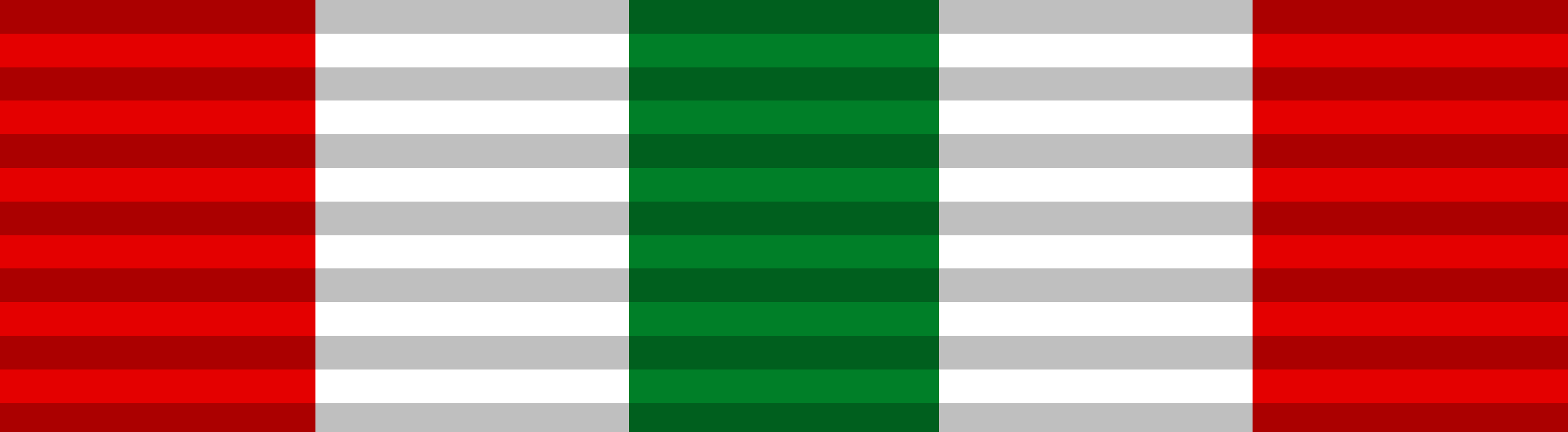
