= Scar Lane drill hall, Milnsbridge =

Scar Lane drill hall
- Milnsbridge
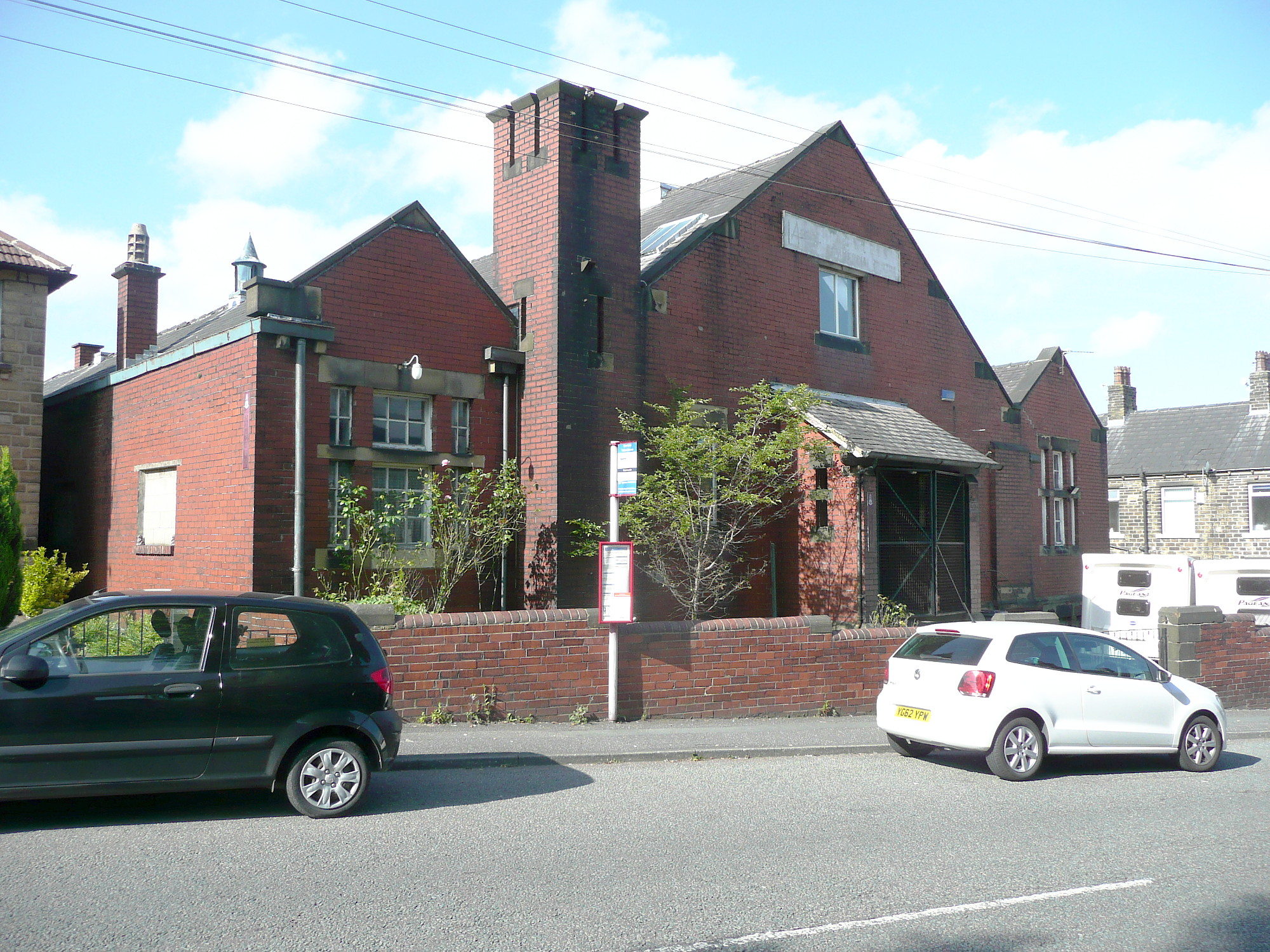
- Scar Lane drill hall

Site information
- Type: Drill hall

Location
- Location in West Yorkshire
- Coordinates: 53.64045°N 1.83684°W

Site history
- Built: 1911
- Built for: War Office
- In use: 1911–1960s

The Scar Lane drill hall is a former military installation in Milnsbridge, West Yorkshire, England.

== History ==
The building was designed as the headquarters of the 7th Battalion, The Duke of Wellington's Regiment and was completed in 1911. The battalion was mobilised at the drill hall in August 1914 before being deployed to the Western Front.

The battalion amalgamated with the 382nd Medium Regiment, Royal Artillery (Duke of Wellington's Regiment) in 1955, a unit which converted back to form the West Riding Battalion, The Duke of Wellington's Regiment (West Riding) at the St Paul's Street drill hall Huddersfield in 1961. The drill hall was decommissioned at that time and then stood vacant for many years before being converted for use as the Bullecourt Museum.
