= James Firth =

Recipient of the Victoria Cross (1874–1921)

James Firth VC
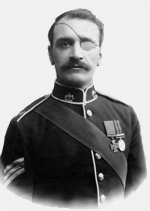
- Born: 15 January 1874; Sheffield, West Riding of Yorkshire
- Died: 29 May 1921 (aged 47); Sheffield
- Burial place: Burngreave Cemetery, Sheffield
- Military career
- Allegiance: United Kingdom
- Branch: British Army
- Service years: 1889 - 1900,
- Rank: Sergeant
- Units: The Duke of Wellington's (West Riding) Regiment
- Conflicts: Second Boer War
- Awards: Victoria Cross

James Firth VC (15 January 1874 – 29 May 1921) was an English recipient of the Victoria Cross, the highest and most prestigious award for gallantry in the face of the enemy that can be awarded to British and Commonwealth forces.

== Early life and family ==
He was born in Sheffield, son of Charles Firth, steel smelter, of Sheffield, later residing in Jarrow-on-Tyne, and Elizabeth Lister also of Sheffield. He joined the Army on 29 July 1889. in June 1897 he married Florence Edwards of Swineshead, Lincolnshire (born 1876) and they had three children: Joseph Wallis Firth, born 1902 (died in 1912, after choking on a playing marble), Alleyne Gatehouse Firth, born 25 June 1903, and Cecil James Firth, born 18 December 1907.

== Military career ==
Firth was 26 years old, and a sergeant in the 1st Battalion, The Duke of Wellington's (West Riding) Regiment, British Army during the Second Boer War when the following deed took place on 24 February 1900 near Arundel, Cape Colony for which he was awarded the VC:

During the action at Plewman's Farm, near Arundel, Cape Colony, on the 24th February, 1900, Lance-Corporal Blackman having been wounded and lying exposed to a hot fire at a range of from four to five hundred yards, Sergeant Firth picked him up and carried him to cover. Later in the day, when the enemy had advanced to within a short distance of the firing line, Second Lieutenant Wilson being dangerously wounded and in a most exposed position Sergeant Firth carried him over the crest of the ridge, which was being held by the troops, to shelter, and was himself shot through the nose and eye whilst doing so.

He returned to the United Kingdom in early 1901, and received the VC from King Edward VII during an investiture at Marlborough House 25 July 1901.

== Death ==
He died of tuberculosis in May 1921 and is buried at Burngreave Cemetery, Sheffield.

== The medal ==
The medal is in the Lord Ashcroft Collection.
