= Duke of Wellington's Regiment =

British Army infantry regiment

- c. 1874 regimental glengarry badge for other ranks
- Active: 1 July 1702 – 6 June 2006
- Country: England (1702–1707); Great Britain (1707–1800); United Kingdom (1801–2006)
- Branch: English Army; British Army
- Type: Line infantry
- Role: Armoured infantry (Warrior IFV)
- Size: One battalion (2006)
- Garrison/HQ: Battlesbury Barracks, Warminster
- Nicknames: "The Dukes", "The Havercake Lads", "The Pattern", "The Immortals", "The Pigs", "The Old Seventy-Sixth", "The Old Seven and Sixpennies", "The Duke of Boot's
- Motto: Virtutis Fortuna Comes (Latin: "Fortune is the companion of virtue")
- Colours and facings: Colours: two Regulation & two Honorary; Red
- March: Quick: The Wellesley
- Mascot: Indian elephant
- Anniversaries: St George's Day (23 April); Waterloo Day (18 June)
- Engagements: See #Battle honours

Commanders
- Last Commanding Officer: Lieutenant Colonel Phil Lewis OBE
- Last Colonel-in-Chief: Brigadier The Duke of Wellington KG LVO OBE MC
- Last Colonel of the Regiment: Major-General Sir Evelyn John Webb-Carter KCVO OBE
- Notable commanders: The Marquess of Cornwallis KG PC; General Sir Charles Huxtable KCB OBE

Insignia
- Tactical Recognition Flash

The Duke of Wellington's Regiment was a line infantry regiment of the British Army, forming part of the King's Division.

In 1702, Colonel George Hastings, 8th Earl of Huntingdon, was authorised to raise a new regiment, which he did in and around the city of Gloucester. As was the custom in those days the regiment was named Huntingdon's Regiment after its Colonel. As Colonel succeeded Colonel the name changed, but in 1751 regiments were given numbers, and the regiment was from that time officially known as the 33rd Regiment of Foot. In 1782, the regiment's title was changed to the 33rd (or First Yorkshire West Riding) Regiment, thus formalising an association with the West Riding of Yorkshire which, even then, had been long established. The first Duke of Wellington died in 1852 and in the following year Queen Victoria, in recognition of the regiment's long ties to him, ordered that the regiment's title be changed to the 33rd (or The Duke of Wellington's) Regiment. In 1881, following the Childers Reforms, the 33rd was linked with the 76th Regiment of Foot, who shared their depot in Halifax. The 76th had first been raised in 1745, by Simon Harcourt and disbanded in 1746, re-raised in 1756, disbanded again in 1763, before being raised again in 1777, disbanded in 1784 and finally re-raised, in 1787, for service in India, by the Honourable East India Company. The two regiments became, respectively, the 1st and 2nd battalions of the Duke of Wellington's Regiment. In 1948, the 1st and 2nd battalions were amalgamated into a single battalion, the 1st Battalion. On 6 June 2006, the 'Dukes' were amalgamated with the Prince of Wales's Own Regiment of Yorkshire and the Green Howards to form the Yorkshire Regiment (14th/15th, 19th and 33rd/76th Foot). As the youngest regiment, the 'Dukes' became the 3rd Battalion, as each battalion retained their antecedent regiment's name in brackets. Following further mergers, in 2012, the battalion was redesignated as the new 1st Battalion (1 Yorks) of the regiment. At this point, the antecedent regimental names were dropped from the battalion titles.

Battalions from the regiment had served in most land conflicts involving British forces since its formation, from the Wars of the Austrian and Spanish successions, through the American war of Independence and various campaigns in India and Africa, the Napoleonic Wars, the Second Boer War and many of the greatest battles of the First World War (the Battle of Mons, the Battle of the Somme, the Battle of Passchendaele, the Battle of Cambrai) and the Third Anglo-Afghan War in 1919. During the Second World War, the regiment fought as part of the British Expeditionary Force in France, forming part of the rearguard at Dunkirk; in North Africa; Italy and in France, following the D-Day landings, and as Chindits in Burma. In Korea, the 'Dukes' desperate defence of the Hook position halted the last major Chinese attempt to break the United Nations Line before the truce, in July 1953, brought the war to an end. In Cyprus, the battalion was successful in Operation Golden Rain, destroying a major EOKA terrorist group operating in the Troodos Mountains in 1956. In 1964, the battalion joined the NATO deterrence in Germany on the front line in the Cold War and from 1971 was regularly engaged in 'The Troubles' in Northern Ireland until 1997. They were amongst the first units to cross the border from Kuwait in the 2003 Iraq War.

Nine soldiers from the regiment have been awarded the Victoria Cross, and Corporal Wayne Mills of the 1st Battalion became the first recipient of the Conspicuous Gallantry Cross in 1994, whilst serving with the United Nations Mission in Bosnia and Herzegovina.

== Formation and name ==
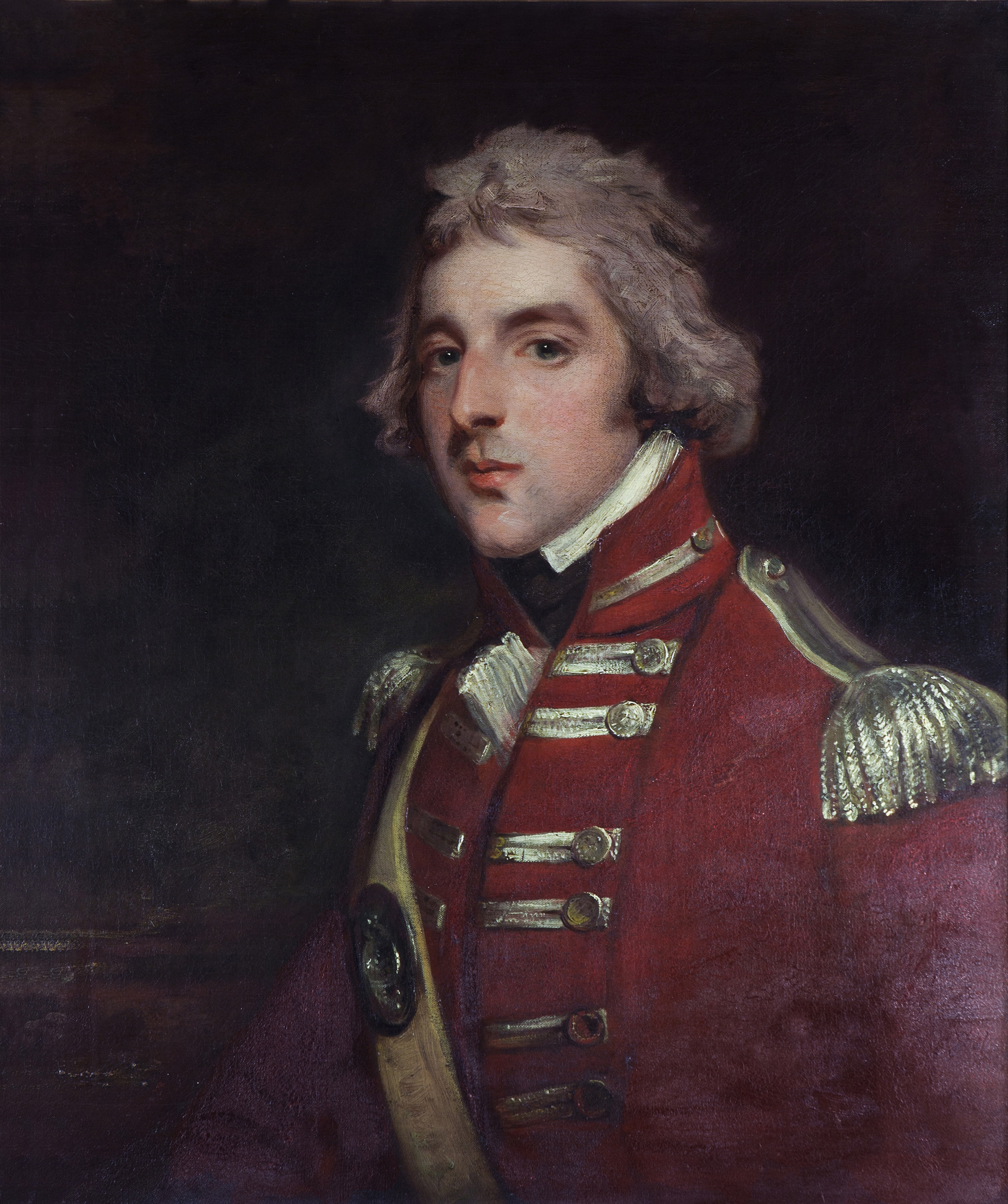
Portrait of Arthur Wellesley by John Hoppner, 1795. The future Duke of Wellington is shown in the uniform of the 33rd

The Duke of Wellington's Regiment was originally formed in 1702 as Huntingdon's Regiment. As regiment designations at that time assumed the name of commanding Colonel, this unit became for example: Henry Leigh's Regiment; then Robert Duncansons Regiment and George Wade's Regiment. Disbanded on 25 March 1714, this unit was officially registered as the 33rd Regiment of Foot in January 1715 then re-raised on 25 March 1715, as George Wade's Regiment; then Henry Hawley's Regiment; Robert Dalzell's Regiment and John Johnson's Regiment.

In 1782 Lord Cornwallis, the then Colonel of the Regiment, wrote that "The 33rd Regiment of Infantry has always recruited in the West Riding of Yorkshire and has a very good interest and the general goodwill of the people in that part of the country:- I should therefore wish not only to be permitted to recruit in that county, but that my Regiment may bear the name of the 33rd or West Yorkshire Regiment". On 31 August 1782 Lord Cornwallis heard that the King had approved of the new title:- 33rd (or the First Yorkshire West Riding) Regiment of Foot.

Owing to its links with the Duke of Wellington, the title 'The Duke of Wellington's Regiment' was granted to the 33rd Regiment on 18 June 1853, on the anniversary of the Battle of Waterloo in the year following Wellington's death.

The 76th Regiment was originally raised, by Simon Harcourt as Lord Harcourt's Regiment on 17 November 1745 and disbanded in June 1746. Following the loss of Menorca, to the French, it was re-raised in November 1756 as the 61st Regiment, but renumbered to 76th, by General Order in 1758, and again disbanded in 1763. A second battalion raised by that regiment in October 1758, for service in Africa, was renumbered as the 86th Regiment and also disbanded in 1763. On 25 December 1777, the 76th was again re-raised, as the 76th Regiment of Foot (Macdonald's Highlanders), by Colonel John MacDonell of Lochgarry, in the West of Scotland and Western Isles, as a Scottish Light Infantry regiment. It was disbanded at Stirling Castle in March 1784. The regiment was again raised for service in India by the Honorable East India Company in 1787.

In 1881 the 76th Regiment, which shared the same Depot in Halifax as the 33rd, was linked to the 33rd, under the Childers Reforms, to become the 2nd Battalion. Although retitled as the Halifax Regiment (Duke of Wellington's) this title only lasted six months until it was changed on 30 June 1881, in a revised appendix to General order 41, to:- The Duke of Wellington's (West Riding Regiment), or 'W Rid R' for short. In January 1921 it was again retitled to The Duke of Wellington's Regiment (West Riding), or 'DWR' for short.

== 1702–1881 ==
c. 1742 engraving of a regimental private

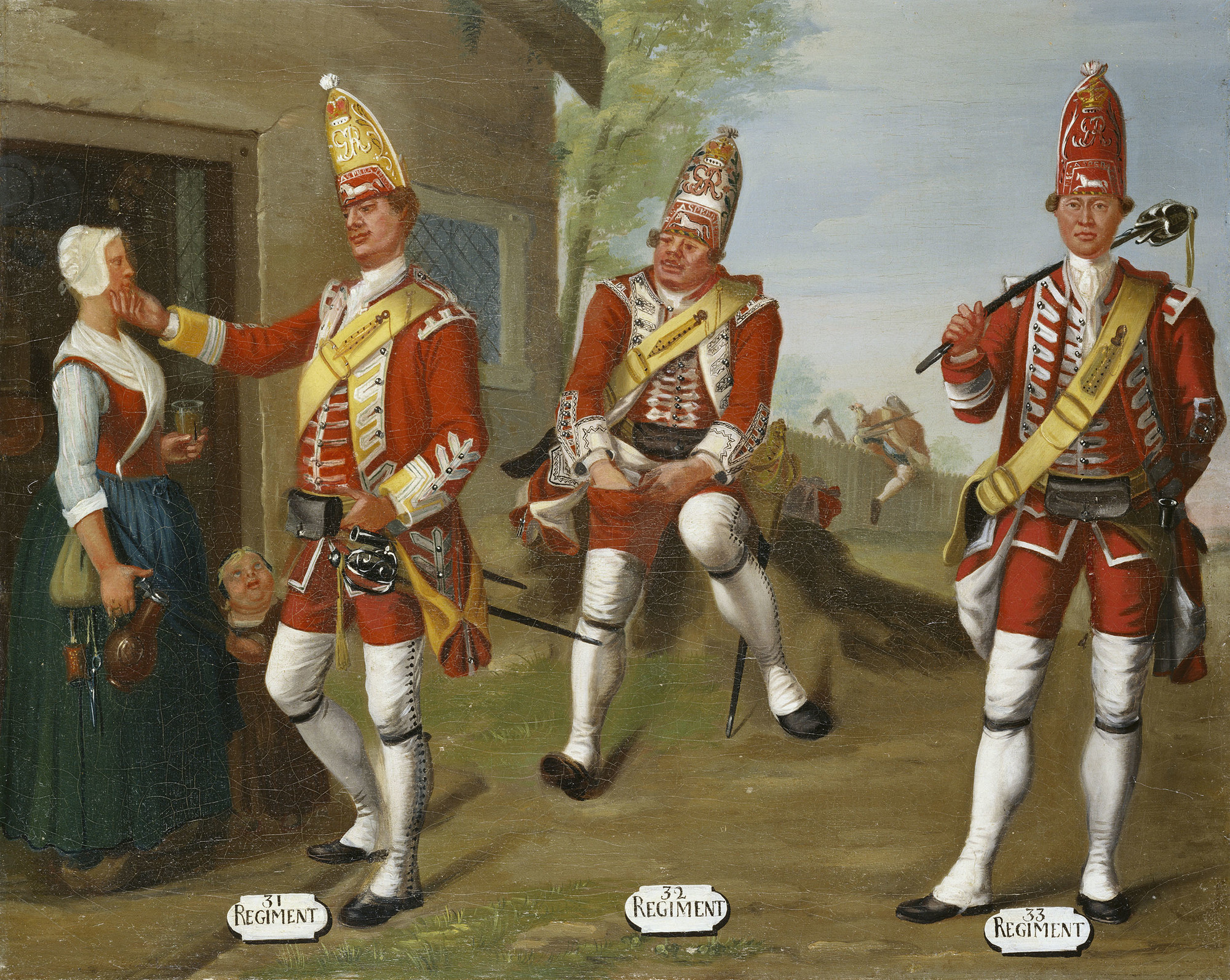
c. 1751 painting of a regimental grenadier (right)

Within months of its original raising the regiment was despatched to join Marlborough's army in Holland. After five months and only two battles it was sent to Portugal, along with five other of Marlborough's best regiments, where it remained for the next six years. The 33rd fought in many battles including Valencia de Alcantara (1705), Zaragossa (1710), and less favourably at Almansa and Brihuega. It was only one of the two foot regiments not to be disbanded and in 1743 the regiment was sent to Germany, where it distinguished itself in the Battle of Dettingen, gaining its first battle honour, then again at the Battle of Fontenoy in 1745 and again in Rocoux and Lauffeld in 1747. During the late 18th century, the regiment gained the familiar nickname The Havercakes, due to its sergeants carrying oatcakes on the tip of their swords to attract new recruits.

=== American Revolution ===
The 33rd itself had a good reputation for its professionalism and capability, which was seemingly unequalled by any other regiment of the British Army for some time. It was because of their professionalism in the field during the American War of Independence, that the regiment was given the nickname 'The Pattern'; the regiment then became the standard of soldiering which all other regiments should attain.

The 33rd saw much action during the American War of Independence, with its first engagement at the Battle of Sullivan's Island (First Siege of Charleston) in early 1776, when British forces attempted an assault on that city's defences. In August of that year, the 33rd were involved in the Battle of Long Island, in which a heavy defeat was inflicted on the Americans, who evacuated their remaining forces to the island of Manhattan.

The regiment's next action came a fortnight later, on 16 September at the Battle of Harlem Heights. After the British had landed and seized New York, a force of British light infantry pursuing an American scouting patrol advanced too far from their lines and found itself in danger of being cut off in an unexpected counterattack. The 33rd formed part of Lord Cornwallis' Reserve Corps sent in support to cover their withdrawal.

The regiment was also involved in the Battle of Fort Washington. After that, the 33rd were not involved in a major battle until September 1777, when they took part in the Battle of Brandywine, where the British suffered 550 casualties and the Americans about 1,000. The regiment took part in further action that year, at the Battle of Germantown and the Battle of White Marsh, where they fought the Americans who had retreated from the fighting at Germantown.

The following year was just as active, with the 33rd seeing action at the Battle of Monmouth, an inclusive engagement that became the largest one-day battle of the war. The 33rd was also part of the defence of Newport and Quaker Hill.

Two years later, in 1780, the 33rd took part in the Siege of Charleston. By 11 May, the American General Benjamin Lincoln began to negotiate terms of surrender. The following day Lincoln, along with over 7,000 American soldiers, surrendered to the British forces under the command of Lieutenant-General Henry Clinton. In August that year, the 33rd were involved at the Battle of Camden, a victory for the British.

==== Guilford Court House ====
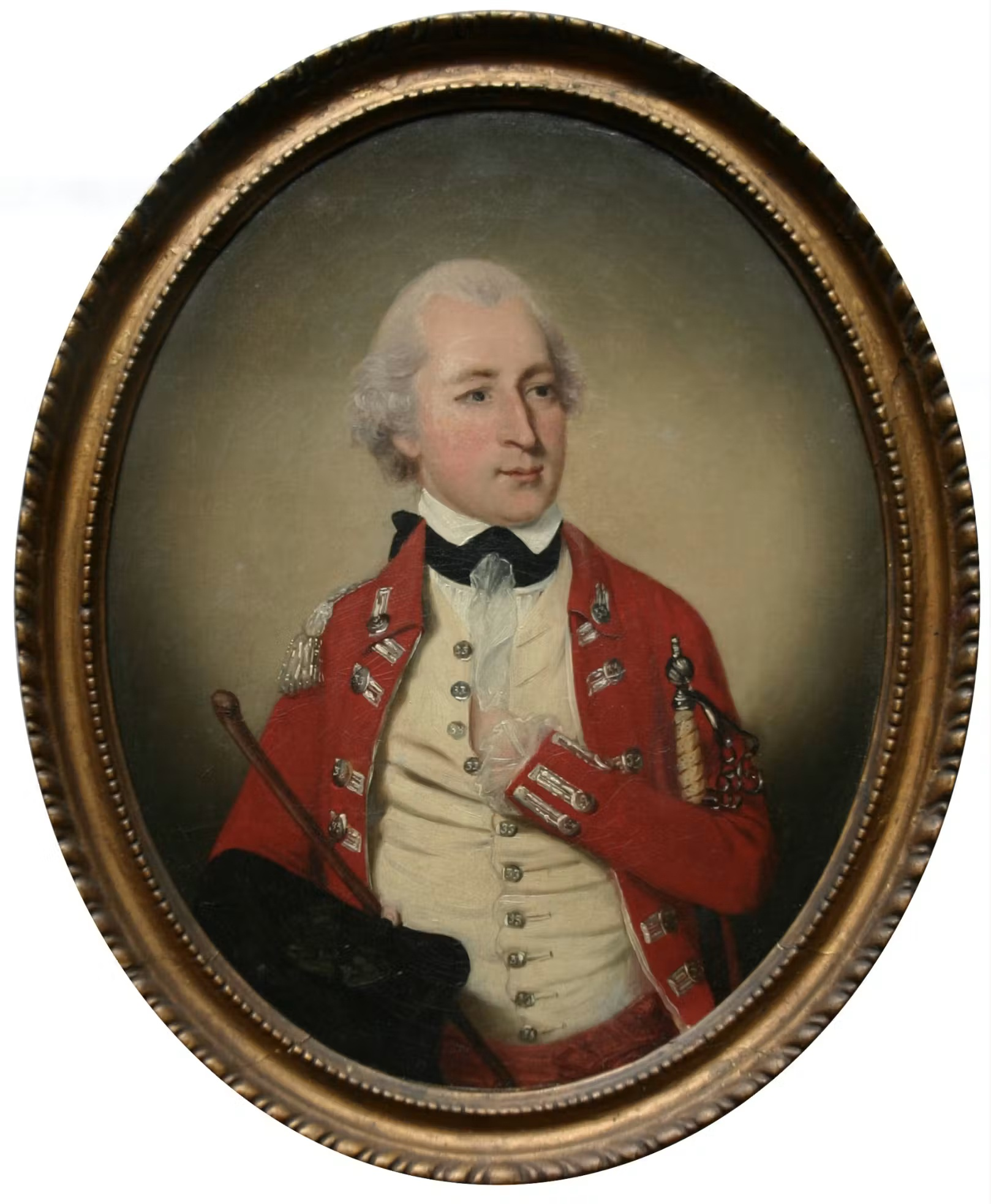
c. 1781–1783 portrait of a regimental officer

The year 1781 proved to be the deadliest but most successful year for the 33rd. The regiment took part in the Battle of Wetzell's Mill, but the more famous action took place that same month during a battle at Guilford Court House. On 14 March 1781, Lord Cornwallis, the British commander, was informed that General Richard Butler was marching to attack his army. With Butler was a body of North Carolina Militia, plus reinforcements from Virginia, consisting of 3,000 Virginia Militia, a Virginia State regiment, a Corp of Virginian "eighteen-month men" and recruits for the Maryland Line. They had joined the command of Major General Nathanael Greene, creating a force of some four to five thousand men in total. During the night, further reports confirmed the American force was at Guilford Court House, some 12 miles (20 km) away. Cornwallis decided to give battle, though he had only 1,900 men at his disposal.

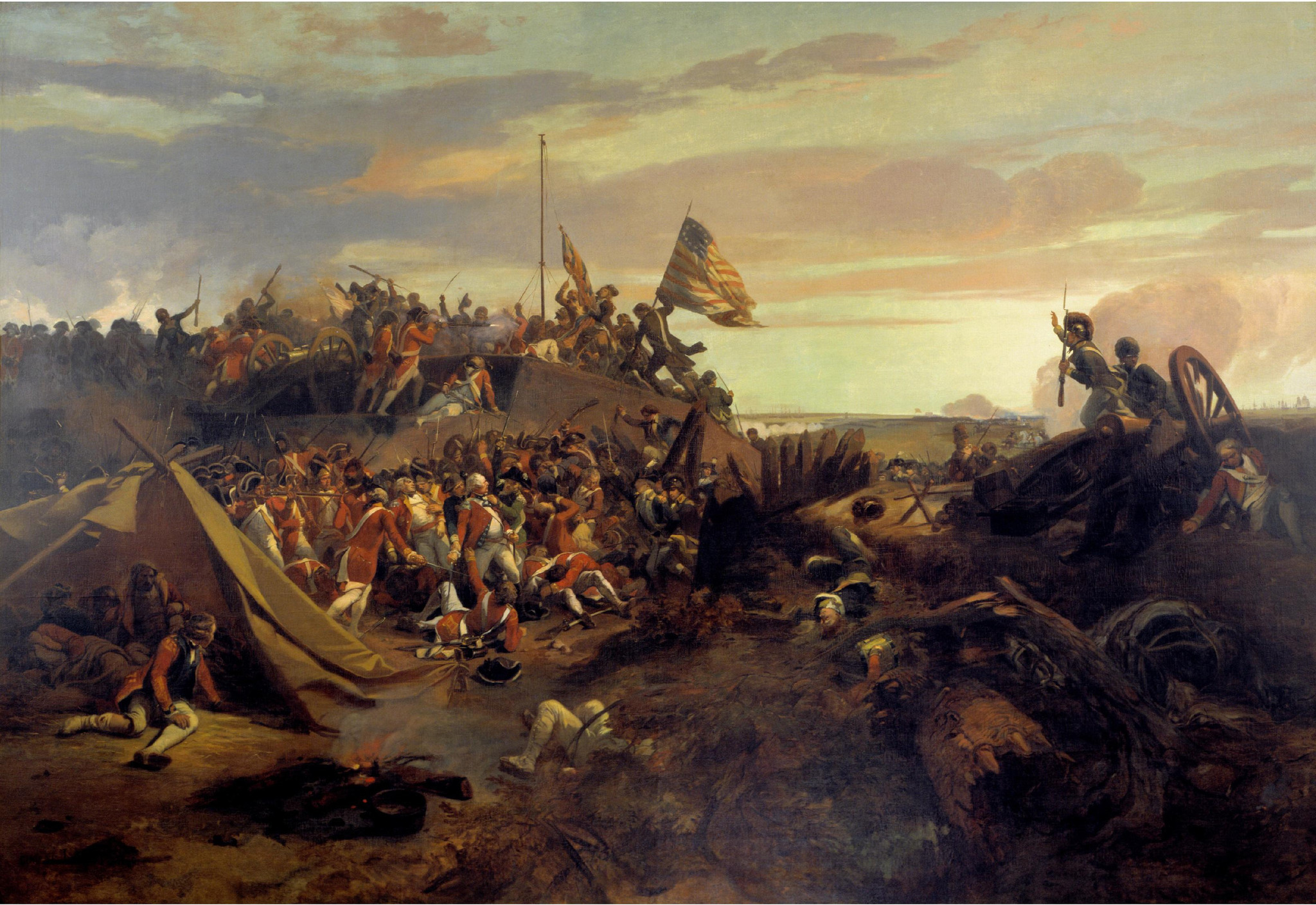
The siege of Yorktown, which the regiment fought in

At dawn on 15 March 1781, before the men had a chance to have breakfast, Cornwallis started for Guilford, arriving there at mid-day. Cornwallis' troops included Bose's Hessian Regiment and the 71st commanded by Major General Alexander Leslie and the 23rd and 33rd commanded by Lieutenant Colonel James Webster of the 33rd. The second line comprised the two battalions of Foot Guards, the Light Infantry and the Grenadiers commanded by Brigadier Charles O'Hara of the 2nd Coldstream Regiment of Foot Guards. There was then a reserve consisting of Tarleton's Light Dragoons.

The British troops advanced under heavy musket fire. Webster attacked the right flank of the American second line and managed to push it back. He also attacked the American third line. An American counterattack then led to a confused situation. Meanwhile, Tarleton's Light Dragoons charged the right flank. The American troops then withdrew. The British defeated the American force, but Webster was killed and O'Hara was wounded.

==== Green Spring ====
The 33rd also fought at the Battle of Green Spring in July of that year. Their last engagement of the war was at the Siege of Yorktown, when they were part of the outnumbered British forces.

=== Flanders ===
In 1793 Arthur Wesley, the third son of the Earl of Mornington and future Duke of Wellington, purchased a commission in the 33rd as a Major. A few months later, in September, his brother lent him more money and with it he purchased a lieutenant-colonelcy in the 33rd.

The regiment took part in the disastrous Flanders Campaign and the retreat from Germany, and embarked, from Bremen, for England on 13 April 1795. Wesley was promoted to full Colonel by seniority on 3 May 1796 and changed his name to Arthur Wellesley in 1798.

=== India ===
In 1799 the regiment took part in the Fourth Anglo-Mysore War in a Division commanded by Colonel Arthur Wellesley, as part of a British East India Company army, commanded by Major General Harris, with Major General Sir David Baird as second in command. Arthur's eldest brother Richard Wellesley, 2nd Earl of Mornington, later 1st Marquess Wellesley, had just become Governor General of India. So in addition to the 33rd, Arthur, who had now become Colonel Arthur Wellesley, was given command of the 10,000 men of the Nizam of Hyderabad. They had a decisive part to play in the Battle of Seringapatam. The regiment, involved in bitter fighting with Tipu Sultan's warriors, were repulsed with heavy losses when they attacked a wood, which was strongly defended by the Sultan's forces. The 33rd rallied and fought further actions throughout the battle, with the British emerging decisively victorious and Tipu Sultan being killed. The regiment won a battle honour for its involvement in the action.

=== Napoleon's return and Waterloo ===
1814 engraving of a regimental recruiting party in Yorkshire

By early March 1815, the regiment was again under the command of the Duke of Wellington, this time during the Hundred Days campaign of Napoleon. Having taken part in the action of the previous day, at the Battle of Quatre Bras, they took part in the action at Waterloo; the 33rd was part of the 5th Brigade under the command of Major General Sir Colin Halkett.

=== West Indies ===
Having departed from Paris on 23 December 1815, the regiment spent the post Waterloo period, from January 1816 to 1821, in uneventful garrison duties in Guernsey, Stirling, Glasgow, Ulster and Dublin.

In 1822, the regiment was posted to Jamaica. The West Indies were notorious as the death bed of the British Army because of the high mortality rate from malaria, dysentery, yellow fever and other such endemic diseases.

=== Crimea ===
Owing to its links with Wellington, the title 33rd (The Duke of Wellington's) Regiment was granted to the 33rd, on 18 June 1853 (the 38th Anniversary of the Battle of Waterloo) by Queen Victoria, in honour of the 1st Duke of Wellington, who had died on 14 September the previous year.

At the Battle of Alma, bitter fighting took place, with the 33rd being part of the Light Division under the command of Sir George Brown. The British advanced up the slope towards the Russian positions. The British formations became intermingled, turning into a mass of soldiers, rather than the professional, neat formations used on parade. As they charged, numerous Russian troops came down the slope to meet them. The British halted and fired, causing so many casualties the Russians were forced to retreat. The British line reorganised and moved up the slope towards the Great Redoubt, with the 33rd being the first to attack the defence works. The 33rd suffered heavy casualties: 7 officers and 232 men in the hand-to-hand combat that ensued.

At the Battle of Inkerman, the 33rd were again involved in some bitter fighting, in which the British infantry advanced despite heavy losses and a strong defence by the Russians. The fighting was fierce, at times some soldiers resorting to attacking their enemy with the butts of their guns. The 33rd suffered further casualties: 3 officers and 61 men.

The 33rd was involved in the Siege of Sevastopol, which lasted for 11 months. By 1856, the war was over but for little gain.

=== Abyssinia ===
The 33rd were part of an expedition sent to the East African nation of Abyssinia, now known as Ethiopia after several European citizens had been taken hostage by the self-appointed 'King' Emperor Tewodros II in 1864. In March 1866 a British envoy had been despatched to secure the release of a group of missionaries who had first been seized after the British Government refused Tewodros's requests for military assistance.

The 33rd was committed to Abyssinia in October 1867 and embarked on 21 November, arriving at Annesley Bay on 4 December; but did not disembark for three days due to the chaos on shore.

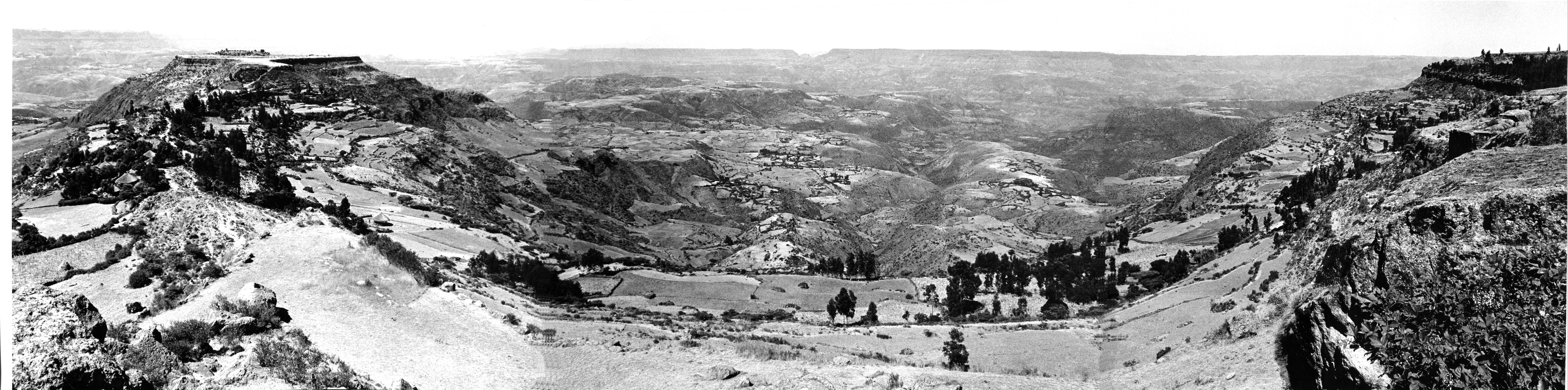
The plateau at Arogye, across the route to Magdala

Lord Napier arrived in early January 1868 and the expedition started from the advance camp at Senafe at the beginning of February. It took two months to reach their objective, advancing through rough terrain. In his despatch to London Lord Napier reported: "Yesterday morning (we) descended three thousand nine hundred feet to Bashilo River and approached Magdala with 'First Brigade' to reconnoitre it. Theodore opened fire with seven guns from outwork, one thousand feet above us, and three thousand five hundred men of the garrison made a gallant sortie which was repulsed with very heavy loss and the enemy driven into Magdala. British loss, twenty wounded".

As the British force moved on to Magdala, Tewodros II sent two of the hostages on parole to offer terms. Napier insisted on the release of all the hostages and an unconditional surrender. Tewodros refused to cede to the unconditional surrender, but did release the European hostages. The British continued the advance and assaulted the fortress. (The native hostages were later found to have had their hands and feet cut off before being sent over the edge of the precipice surrounding the plateau.)

On reaching the gate there was a pause in the advance, as it was discovered the engineer unit had forgot their powder kegs and scaling ladders and were ordered to return for them. General Staveley was not happy at any further delay and ordered the 33rd to continue the attack. Several officers and the men of the 33rd Regiment, along with an officer from the Royal Engineers, parted from the main force and, after climbing the cliff face, found their way blocked by a thorny hedge over a wall. Private James Bergin, a very tall man, used his bayonet to cut a hole in the hedge and Drummer Michael Magner climbed onto his shoulders through the hedge in the gap and dragged Bergin up behind him as Ensign Conner and Corporal Murphy helped shove from below. Bergin kept up a rapid rate of fire on the Koket-Bir as Magner dragged more men through the gap in the hedge. As more men poured through and opened fire as they advanced with their bayonets the defenders withdrew through the second gate. The party rushed the Koket-bir before it was fully closed and then took the second gate breaking through to the Amba. Ensign Wynter scrambled up onto the top of the second gate and fixed the 33rd Regiments Colours to show the Plateau had been taken. Private Bergin and Drummer Magner were later awarded the Victoria Cross for their part in the action.

Tewodros II was found dead inside the second gate, having shot himself with a pistol that had been a gift from Queen Victoria. When his death was announced all opposition ceased. The regiment later received the battle honour Abyssinia.

== Volunteers ==
The invasion scare of 1859 led to the creation of the Volunteer Force and huge enthusiasm for joining local Rifle Volunteer Corps (RVCs). A large number of individual RVCs were raised in the West Riding; some amalgamated into larger units, and the rest of the smaller units were grouped into administrative battalions. For example, the RVCs raised in Halifax were amalgamated as the 4th Yorkshire (West Riding) RVC in 1860. The senior unit in the 5th Admin Bn at Huddersfield was the 6th Yorkshire (West Riding) RVC, officially entitled the Huddersfield Rifles in 1868. In 1880 the 5th Admin Bn was consolidated as a new 6th Yorkshire (West Riding) RVC. Similarly, the 2nd Admin Bn at Skipton-in-Craven was consolidated as a new 9th Yorkshire (West Riding) RVC in 1880.

== Childers Reforms of 1881 ==
The Childers Reforms (and as a continuation of the Cardwell Reforms) brought the Militia into the regimental system, and the two battalions of 6th West York Militia became the 3rd and 4th Battalions of the Duke of Wellington's. The 76th Foot was amalgamated with the 33rd Foot and became the 2nd Battalion of The Duke of Wellington's Regiment, with a new stand of 2nd Battalion colours and retaining the original stand of 76th's Honorary Colours. The 1st Battalion retained their original regimental colours.

At the same time the three West Riding Volunteer battalions became linked with the regiment. In February 1883, as part of the Childers Reforms, these three corps were designated as the 1st, 2nd and 3rd Volunteer Battalions of the Duke of Wellington's Regiment. By 1887 they had adopted the same uniform as the parent unit. Under the mobilisation scheme introduced by the Stanhope Memorandum of December 1888 the Volunteer Battalions of the Duke of Wellington's were assigned to the West Yorkshire Volunteer Infantry Brigade in Northern Command and in the event of war were expected to mobilise at Leeds.

== Duties of Empire (1881–1914) ==
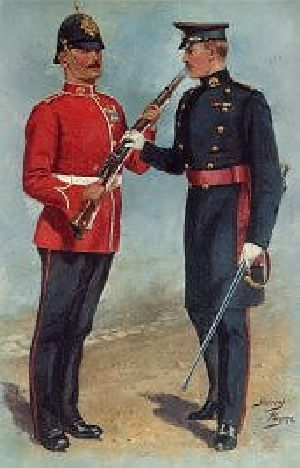
Uniforms of The Duke of Wellington's Regiment as worn 1902–14, by Harry Payne

The 2nd battalion was stationed at the Imperial fortress of Bermuda (where it had previously been from 1840 to 1841) from 1886, where new Colours were presented by Governor and Commander-in-Chief of Bermuda Lieutenant-General Sir Thomas Lionel John Gallwey, Royal Engineers, on 2 May 1888, at Prospect Camp. The battalion was transferred to Halifax, Nova Scotia later in 1888, and then to the West Indies in 1891. In April 1893 the battalion, under Lt-Col. E. Nesbitt, set sail for the Cape Colony, posting one company on St Helena en route. In October a detachment of 3 officers and 51 NCOs and men were despatched up-country to serve with the Bechuanaland Border Police in the Matabele Uprising, in a complicated arrangement due to the fact that the BPP was at the time run by the British South Africa Company.

Some detachments of the battalion stayed on to serve in the Second Matabele War (1896–1897), being stationed in the colony of Natal in between. 13 officers and 320 NCOs and men proceeded on active service. Some served on the staff, some with mounted infantry, some with the Matabeleland Relief Force and other service companies.

The regiment began the first year of the 20th century at war when both battalions met in South Africa, as reinforcements for British forces fighting Boers, in the Second Boer War. The 1st battalion had arrived there before war started in 1899, the 2nd battalion arrived in early 1900, and took part in the Relief of Kimberley, in February 1900, which had been under siege by the Boers since October 1899. The battalion also took part in the Battle of Paardeberg.

The 3rd (Militia) Battalion (the former 6th West York Militia) was embodied in January 1900 for service in South Africa, and 500 officers and men left Queenstown for Cape Town the following month. Most of the battalion returned to the United Kingdom in late May 1902.

All three Volunteer Battalions also sent service companies to support the Regular battalions, and received the Battle Honour South Africa 1900–1902.

Following the end of the war in South Africa, the 1st battalion returned to York, while the 2nd battalion went to British India, first to Rangoon then in late 1902 to Lebong in Bengal.

== Territorial Force ==
When the Territorial Force (TF) was formed under the Haldane Reforms in 1908, Volunteer Battalions were renumbered as battalions of their parent regiments. The Duke of Wellington's 1st VB became the 4th Battalion, (4DWR), at Prescott Street in Halifax. The 2nd VB formed two new battalions: the 5th Battalion, (5DWR), at St Paul's Street in Huddersfield, and the 7th Battalion, (7DWR), at Scar Lane in Milnsbridge. The 3rd VB became the 6th Battalion, (6DWR), at Otley Road in Skipton. The former West Yorkshire Brigade was split in two, and the four TF battalions of the Duke of Wellington's Regiment composed the new 2nd West Riding Brigade in the West Riding Division.

== First World War ==
=== Regular Army ===
The 1st Battalion remained in India throughout the war, serving first with the 2nd (Rawalpindi) Division and then with the 1st (Peshawar) Division.

The 2nd Battalion landed at Le Havre as part of the 13th Brigade in the 5th Division in August 1914 for service on the Western Front. It first saw action at the Battle of Mons. It then fought a rearguard action at the Battle of Le Cateau, an action during the retreat from Mons. The 2nd Battalion also fought at the First Battle of the Marne, the Battle of the Aisne, the Battle of La Bassée and the brutal first Battle of Ypres. The 2nd Battalion was also at the Battle of Hill 60 during which the British launched a massive bombardment, followed by an assault that led to vicious hand-to-hand fighting. The 8th Battalion saw service in the Gallipoli Campaign and the 10th Battalion was in action at Piave in Italy.

=== Territorial Force ===
The 1/4th, 1/5th, 1/6th and 1/7th battalions landed in France as part of the 147th (2nd West Riding) Brigade in the 49th (West Riding) Division in April 1915 for service on the Western Front and served together until the Armistice in November 1918. They saw action on the Somme, at Ypres, during the German spring offensive and the final Allied Hundred Days Offensive.

In August 1914 the Territorial Force formed 2nd Line units, distinguished from the 1st Line by the addition of '2/' to the battalion number, the parent units taking '1/'. The 2/4th, 2/5th, 2/6th and 2/7th Battalions of the Duke of Wellingtons formed 186th (2/2nd West Riding) Brigade in 62nd (2nd West Riding) Division. The division's training was hampered by the lack of equipment and by the need to provide drafts to the 1st Line units serving overseas, but finally landed in France in January 1917 and served on the Western Front until the Armistice. It fought at Arras, Cambrai, in the Spring Offensive and the Hundred Days, and was the only TF division selected to form part of the Allied occupation force in the Rhineland after the war.

The Territorial Force battalions also formed 3rd Line units, which remained in the UK training and supplying drafts for the battalions overseas.

=== New Armies ===
The 8th (Service) Battalion landed at Suvla Bay in Gallipoli as part of the 32nd Brigade in the 11th (Northern) Division in August 1915; the battalion was evacuated in January 1916 and moved to France in July 1916 for service on the Western Front. The 9th (Service) Battalion landed at Boulogne-sur-Mer as part of the 52nd Brigade in the 17th (Northern) Division in July 1915 also for service on the Western Front while the 10th (Service) Battalion landed at Le Havre as part of the 69th Brigade in the 23rd Division in August 1915 also for service on the Western Front.

== Inter-war (1919–1938) ==
In 1919, the 1st Battalion took part in the Third Anglo-Afghan War and eventually returned home in 1921. Meanwhile, the regiment's title altered slightly in 1921 to Duke of Wellington's Regiment (West Riding).

In the 1930s the increasing need for anti-aircraft (AA) defence for Britain's cities was addressed by converting a number of TA infantry battalions into searchlight battalions of the Royal Engineers (RE). The 5th Duke of Wellington's was one unit selected for this role, becoming 43rd (5th Duke of Wellington's) Anti-Aircraft Battalion, Royal Engineers (5DWR) in 1936, retaining its Duke of Wellington's cap badge.

In 1938, the 4th Battalion at Halifax was converted into 58th (Duke of Wellington's Regiment) Anti-Tank Regiment, Royal Artillery (4DWR). A duplicate unit, the 68th Anti-Tank Regiment, Royal Artillery was formed in 1939, with headquarters at Cleckheaton.

== Second World War ==
=== 1st Battalion ===
The Second World War was declared on 3 September 1939, and the 1st Battalion, commanded by Lieutenant Colonel Edmund Charles Beard, was immediately sent to France as part of the 3rd Infantry Brigade of the 1st Infantry Division of 1st Corps of the BEF. During the retreat to Dunkirk, the 'Dukes' formed part of the rearguard.

The 'Dukes' fought in the North African Campaign, fighting with distinction in a number of actions and gaining several Battle Honours, as part of the 3rd Infantry Brigade. They fought at the Battle of Medjez Plain and the Battle of Banana Ridge and in the Battle of Djebel bou Aoukaz. The Bou was a ridge dominating the Medjez el Bab to Tunis road.

The 'Dukes' also fought in the Italian Campaign. They took part in the Anzio Campaign, in an attempt to outflank the Gustav Line and force a German retreat from Monte Cassino. The 'Dukes' fought with distinction at the Battle of Monte Cece in October 1944 where Captain Arthur Burns was awarded a DSO and Private Richard Henry Burton of the 1st Battalion was awarded a Victoria Cross for his courageous action in the battle.

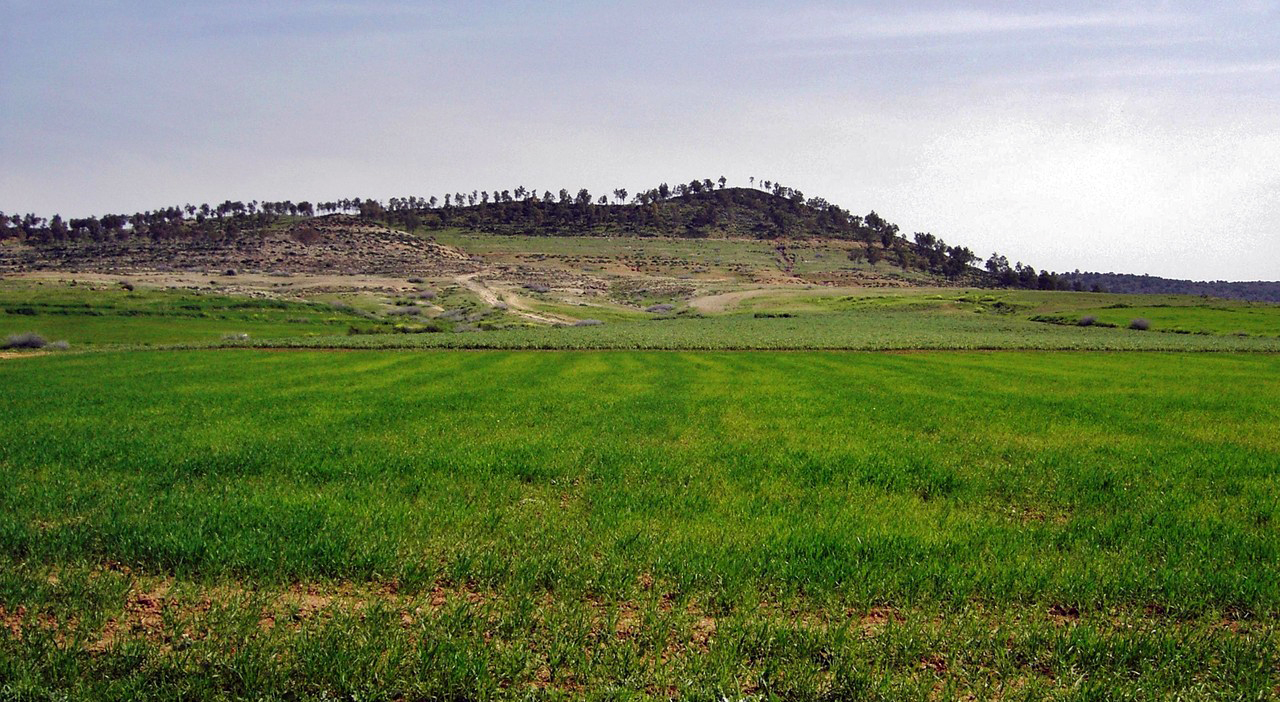
View of 'point 171' from the dry Wadi

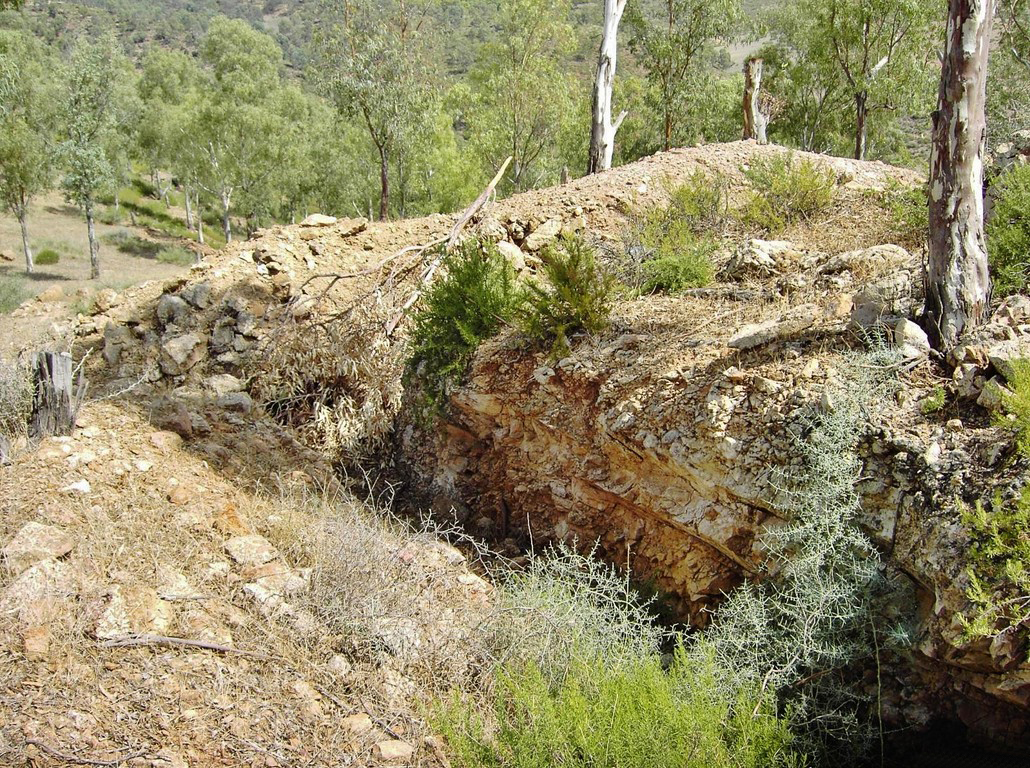
Remnant of Trench at 'Point 171' facing towards 'Point 226'

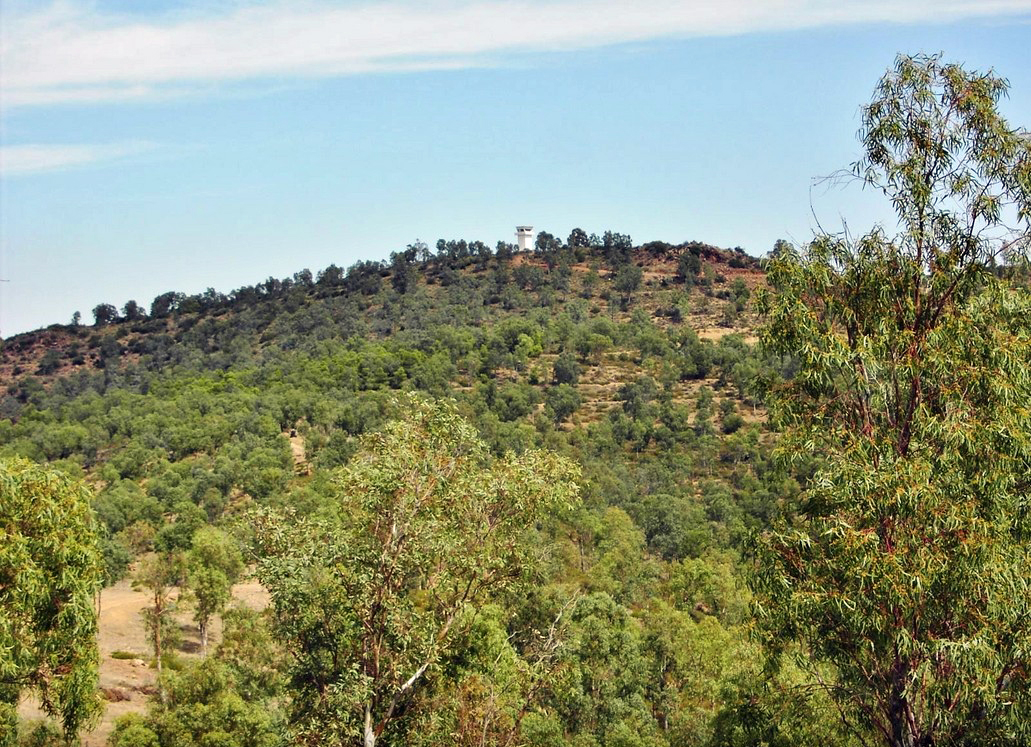
View of 'Point 226', on Bou Aoukaz, from 'Point 171'

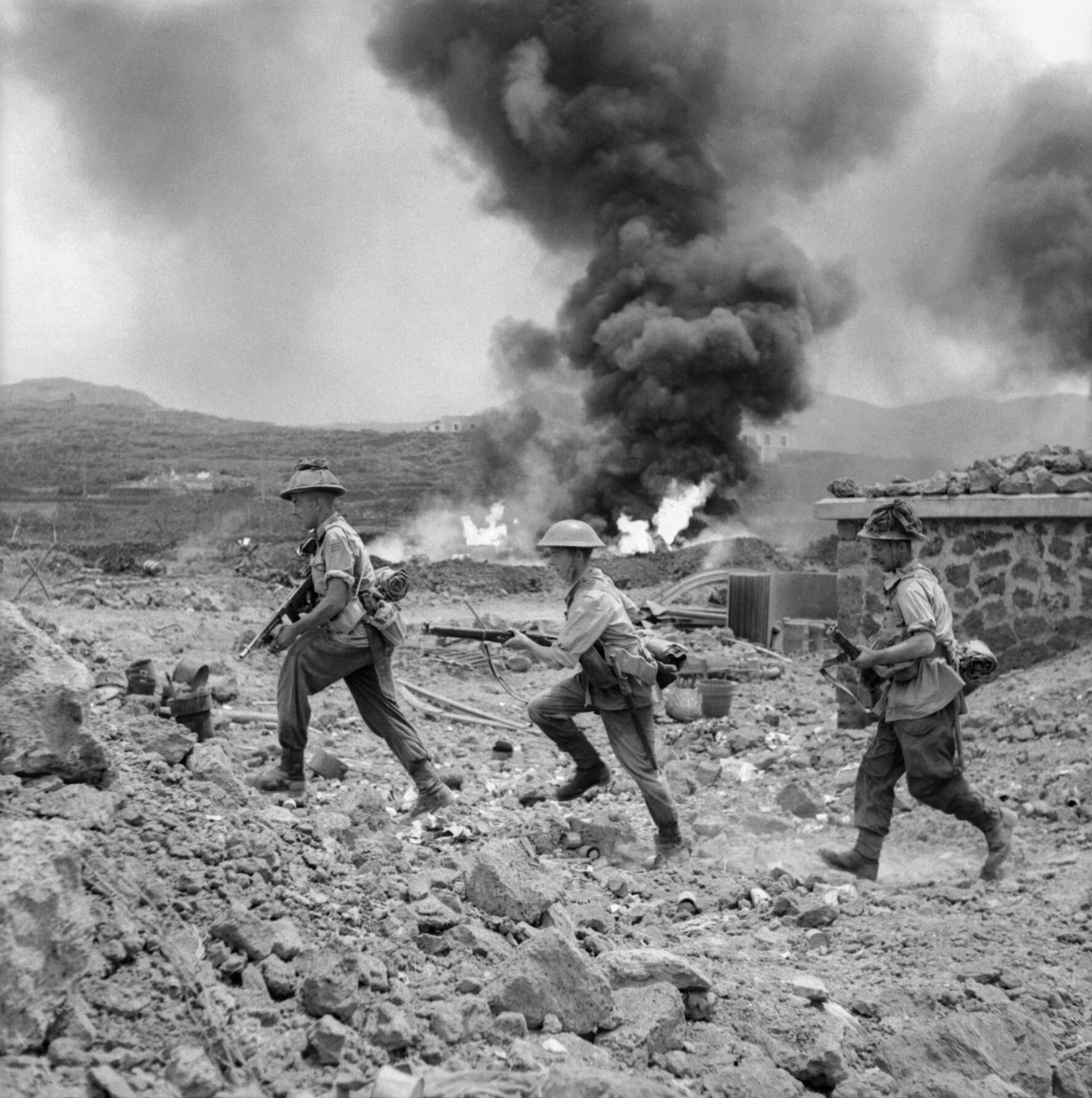
Men of 1st Battalion, The Duke of Wellington's Regiment, advance past a burning fuel store on Pantelleria during Operation Corkscrew

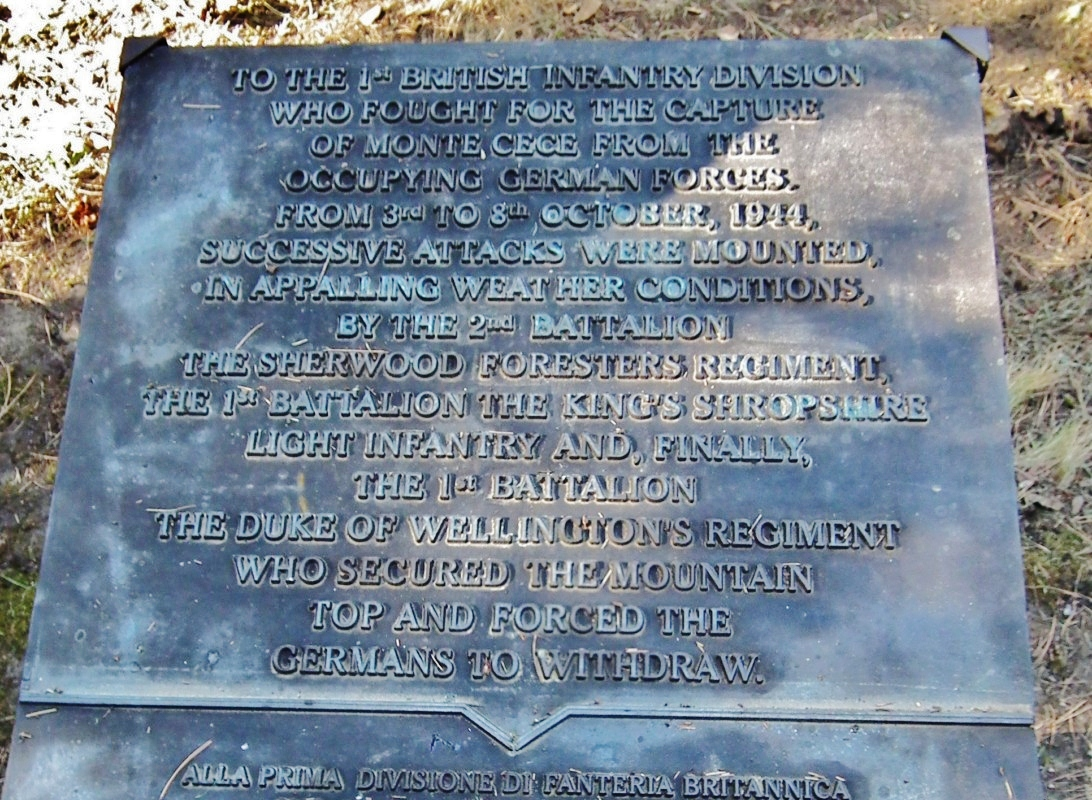
Memorial Plaque on summit of Monte Cece (Monte Ceco), near Casola Valsenio

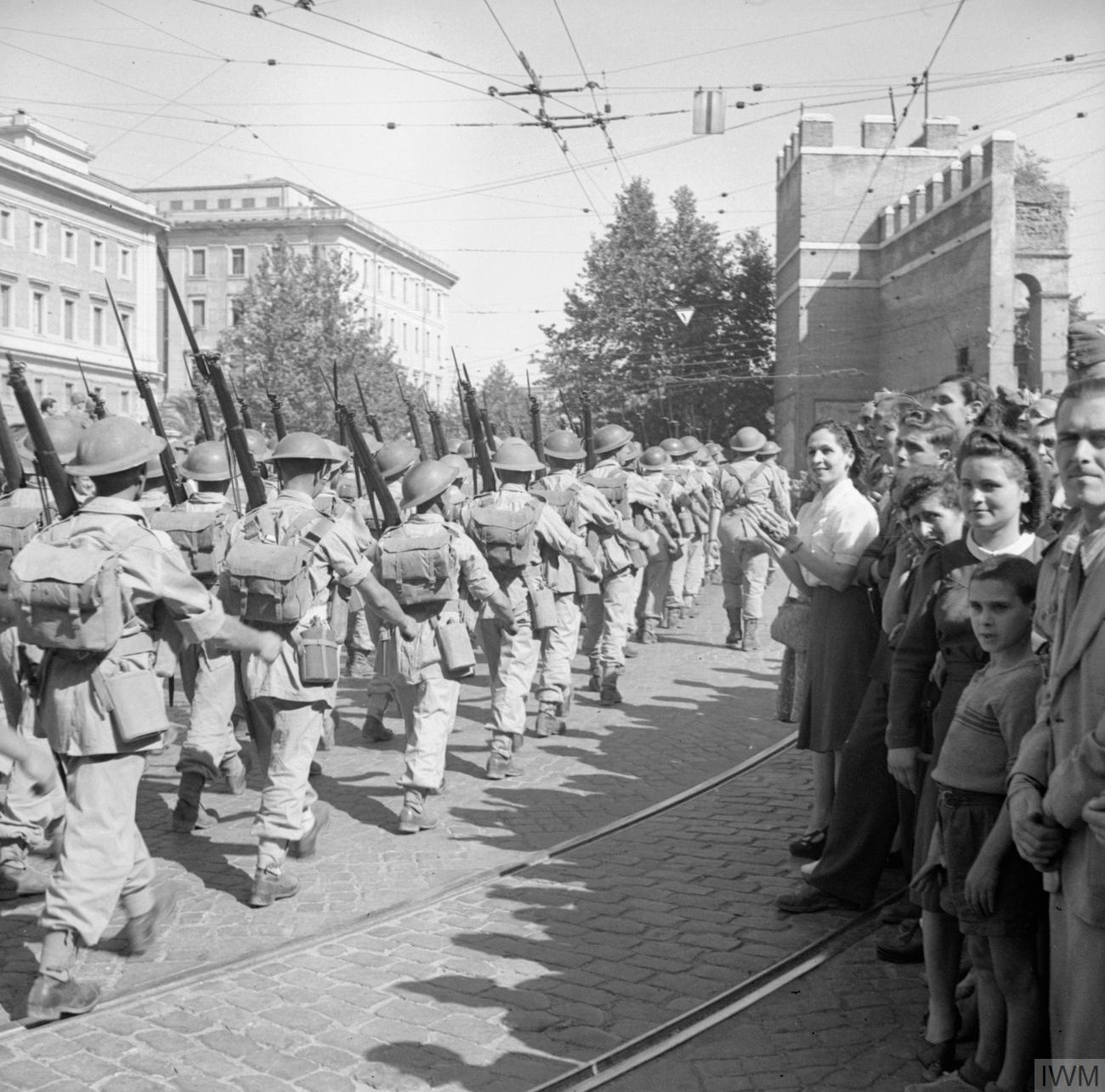
Men of 1st Battalion, The Duke of Wellington's Regiment marching into Rome, 8 June 1944

=== 2nd Battalion ===
In the Far East, the 2nd Battalion took part in the rearguard action at the Battle of Sittang Bridge in February 1942. They were trained as Chindits, to operate behind Japanese lines, who were at that time attacking India, they were formed into two columns, the 33rd and 76th, (Note: That the regiment was formed from the 33rd and 76th Regiments of Foot and that the 2nd Battalion formed 33rd and 76th Columns of the Chindits is not a coincidence.) to operate behind the Japanese lines during the fierce battles for Imphal and Kohima.

=== 58th (Duke of Wellington's) Anti-Tank Regiment ===
The regiment served in North Africa, Italy, Greece and Austria during the war.

=== 43rd AA (5th Duke of Wellington's) Battalion ===
See main article Huddersfield Rifles

43rd AA Battalion served in 31st (North Midland) Anti-Aircraft Brigade, protecting West Yorkshire during the Blitz. In 1940 the RE AA battalions were transferred to the Royal Artillery, and it became the 43rd (5th Duke of Wellington's) Searchlight Regiment, Royal Artillery.

In 1944 the regiment was assigned to 21st Army Group preparing for the Normandy Campaign. In the event, the regiment did not take part. However, by the autumn of 1944, the German Luftwaffe was suffering from such shortages of pilots, aircraft and fuel that serious aerial attacks on the UK could be discounted. At the same time 21st Army Group was experiencing a severe manpower shortage, particularly among the infantry. The War Office began to reorganise surplus AA regiments in the UK into infantry units, primarily for duties in the rear areas, thereby releasing trained infantry for frontline service. On 1 October 1944, 43rd S/L Rgt was converted into 43rd (5th Bn Duke of Wellington's) Garrison Regiment, RA. A month later, it was reorganised as an infantry battalion and redesignated 600th Regiment RA (5th Bn Duke of Wellington's). It was the first such RA infantry regiment formed, and was sent to join Second Army in NW Europe for line of communication duties. The unit was placed in 'suspended animation' in February 1945 and its personnel drafted to other units.

=== 1/6th and 1/7th battalions ===
The 1/6th and 1/7th battalions of the regiment were both assigned to the 147th Infantry Brigade, alongside the 1/5th West Yorkshire Regiment, which itself was part of the 49th (West Riding) Infantry Division. The brigade did not see service with the rest of the division in the Norwegian Campaign, but were instead sent to Iceland after it was invaded in 1940, and remained there until May 1942 when it was transferred back to the United Kingdom. On 28 February 1943, both 2/6DWR and 2/7DWR battalions had been dissolved and the 1/6DWR and 1/7DWR battalions dropped the /prefix, becoming, simply, (6DWR) and (7DWR) respectively. They both landed in Normandy on 12 June 1944 shortly after the D-Day landings of 6 June. They fought in the Battle of Normandy as part of the British Second Army in its attempts to capture the city of Caen. In particular, the 6th Battalion was severely mauled during Operation Martlet and, due to the heavy casualties sustained, was returned to the United Kingdom and disbanded, most of its men being sent to the 7th Battalion. They were replaced in the brigade by the 1st Battalion, Leicestershire Regiment. The 7th Battalion continued to fight in the Normandy Campaign in the Second Battle of the Odon, and clearing the Channel Ports in Operation Astonia.

After the failure of Operation Market Garden, the 7th Battalion was stationed at the Nijmegen bridgehead, in late November, and around Haalderen. Just after midnight of 1 December the battalion was being hit by heavy artillery, mortar and Spandau fire. As the night progressed they came under attack from multiple infantry elements of the German 6th Parachute Division in an attempt to capture the Nijmegen bridge. Fighting intensified, taking in house to house fighting throughout Haalderen and Gendt During the nights of 3–4 December, with small arms and grenades, with the Dukes 'A Company' Headquarters in the village school. Fighting was very confused and movement limited due to heavy flooding of the ground from the breached canals and river. A German officer, 2nd Lieutenant Heinich, 5 Coy 16 Parachute Regiment, was captured by members of 'B' company, who were laying trip flares. Major Denis Hamilton (who was in temporary command of the battalion) quickly organised a defence, using his Bren Gun Carriers, to hold back the Germans. Over 100 prisoners, with a further 50 killed or wounded were taken from the 5th, 7th and 10th companies of the German 16 Para Regiment. By 6 December the attack had died out and the 'Dukes' were relieved by the 11th Battalion, Royal Scots Fusiliers. 7DWR moved into reserve in Bemmel where they received sporadic shelling from heavy artillery, whilst putting out patrols to guard against a potential waterborne attack on the Nijmegen bridge. The next notable service seen by the battalion was in the Liberation of Arnhem in April 1945, shortly before Victory in Europe Day.

=== 2/6th and 2/7th battalions ===
Throughout the spring and summer of 1939, the Territorial Army was ordered to expand in size and double its strength by creating duplicate units and, as a result, the 6th and 7th battalions created duplicate units, the 2/6th and 2/7th battalions. Both battalions became part of the 137th Infantry Brigade, attached to the 46th (West Riding and North Midland) Infantry Division and were sent overseas to France in April 1940 to join the British Expeditionary Force. Poorly trained and equipped, both battalions were battered during the German Army's blitzkrieg during the Battle of France and were forced to retreat to Dunkirk and be evacuated to England. The battalions spent the next two years on home defence, preparing for a German invasion which never arrived. In July 1942 these battalions were transferred to the Royal Armoured Corps and converted to armour as 114 RAC and 115 RAC. They continued to wear their Duke's badge on the black beret of the Royal Armoured Corps.

=== 8th Battalion ===
The regiment's 8th Battalion was raised in July 1940 and in 1941 it was also converted to a tank unit becoming 145th Regiment RAC (8DWR). The regiment served in 21st Army Tank Brigade, equipped with Churchill tanks. It joined 1st Army in Algeria, North Africa and was transferred to 25th Army Tank Brigade in support of 24 Guards Brigade (1st Division) on the push through Casablanca and Oran to Tunisia. It was one of the units in support of the Dukes 1st Battalion and the Loyal Regiment (North Lancashire) at the Battle of Banana Ridge, overlooking the Medjez el Bab plain, as the front part of a five-mile-wide divisional offensive to advance on Tunis. The battle on the ridge resulted in the 1st Dukes and the QLR's being the only units to be award the battle honour Banana Ridge. A following battle resulted in the award of the battle honour Djebel Bou Aoukaz on the 1st Dukes, the 1st King's Shropshire Light Infantry and 145th Regiment RAC (8DWR).

=== 9th Battalion ===
The 9th Battalion was also converted to armour, becoming 146th Regiment RAC (DWR).

== Postwar ==
When the TA was reformed in 1947, the 4th, 5th and 6th Battalions became the 382nd (Duke of Wellington's Regiment) Anti-Tank Regiment (later Medium Regiment), 578th (5th Bn, The Duke of Wellington's Regiment) Heavy Anti-Aircraft Regiment, and 673rd (Duke of Wellington's Regiment) Light Anti-Aircraft Regiment respectively of the Royal Artillery. Notes in the DWR magazine of April 1949 regarding the 673 (DWR) LAA Regiment said that "the Regiment has had a very varied career since it was formed on May 1, 1947. We started off our existence as a Mobile H.A.A. Regiment in 92 A.G.R.A. In September, 1948, 92 A.G.R.A. was disbanded, and the Regiment is now attached to Anti-Aircraft Command but still remains a Field Force unit of the 21 Northern Corps. On January 1, 1949, we converted to L.A.A., and "hope that this is the last of the changes."

In 1955 the three regiments merged into the 382nd, each providing one battery. In 1957 some of the 5th Bn battery transferred to the 7th Bn (still in the infantry role) and formed the 5/7th Bn, thereby bringing together both parts of the former 2nd Volunteer Bn. Finally, in 1961, the rest of 382 Rgt converted to infantry and merged with the 5/7th Bn, bringing together all four Territorial battalions of the regiment as the West Riding Battalion, which in 1967 became part of the Yorkshire Volunteers.

== Korean War (1952–1956) ==
The 1st Battalion was deployed to Korea in 1952, two years after the Korean War had broken out. They were part of the 1st Commonwealth Division.

=== Battle of The Hook ===
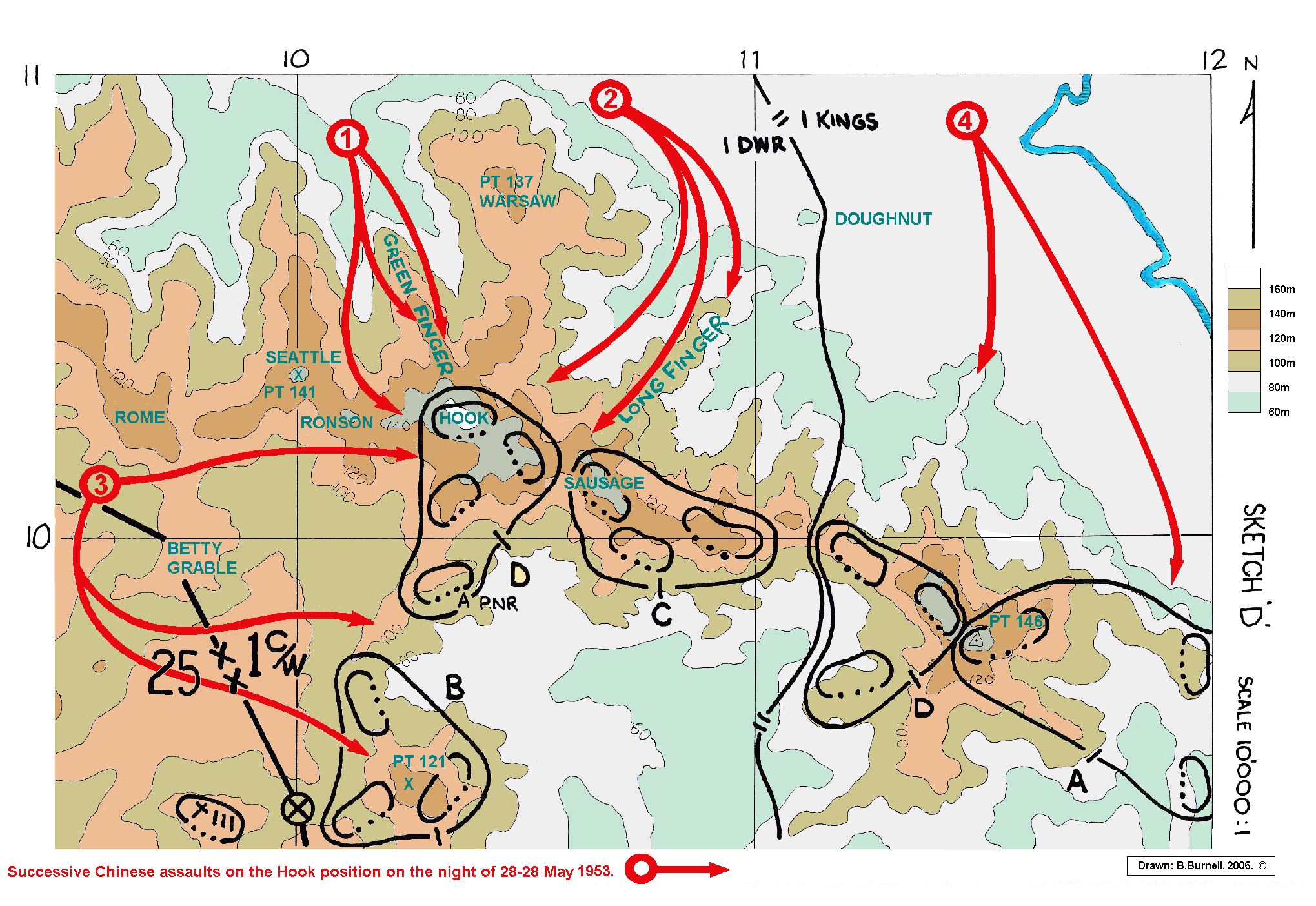
Successive Chinese assaults on the Hook position on the night of 28–29 May 1953. Redrawn from poor quality sketch maps filed with 1DWR Regimental War Diaries, archived as WO/308/53 at the Public Record Office, London

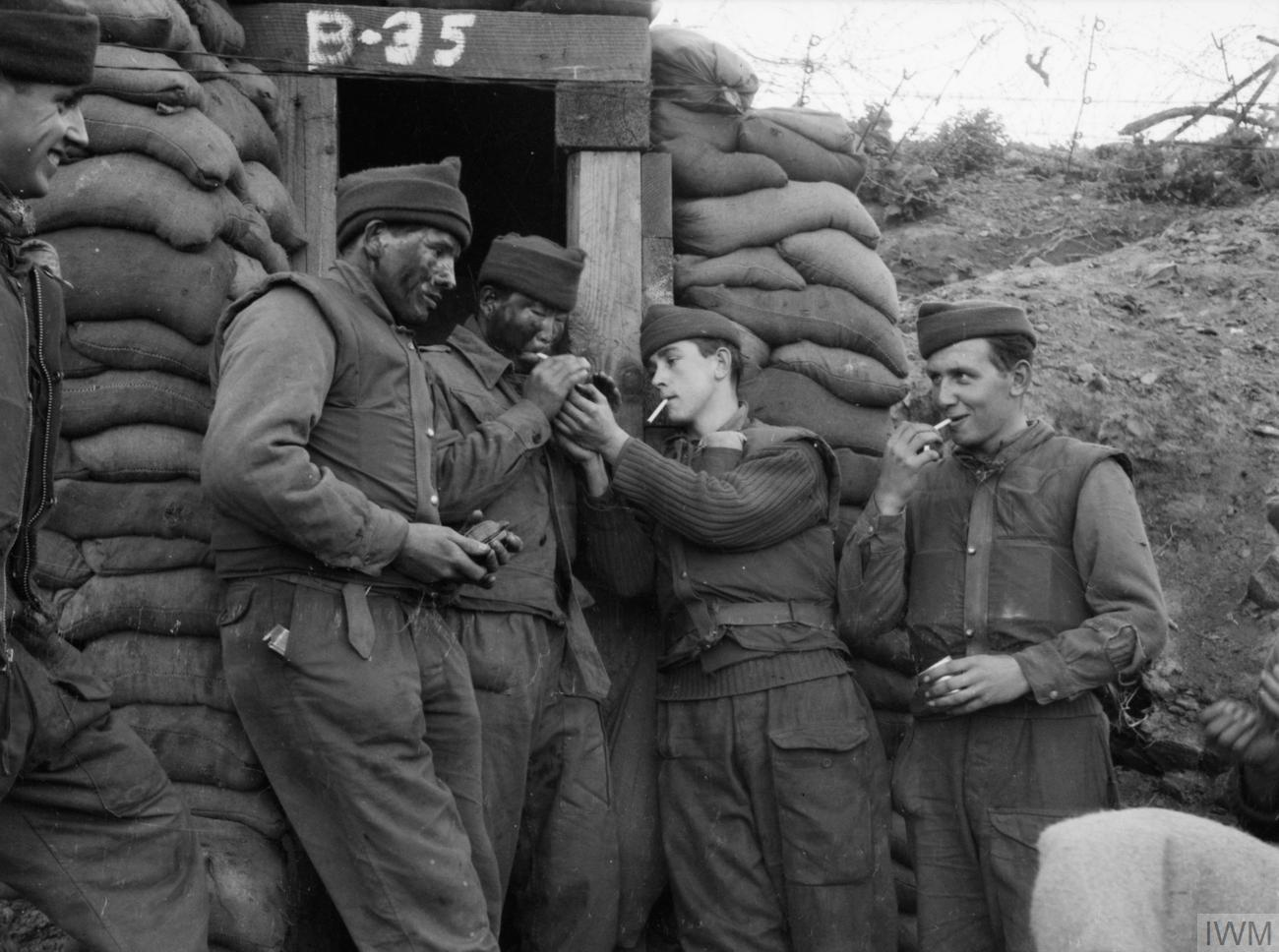
Men of the 1st Battalion, The Duke of Wellington's Regiment in Korea

In 1953, the 1st Battalion relieved the Black Watch, who had been defending a position known as The Hook, a crescent shaped ridge, which was of tactical importance in the Commonwealth sector. The third Battle of the Hook began on 28 May. An initial bombardment of the British positions took place, with the Chinese forces charging the forward British positions once the bombardment ceased. The fighting that ensued was bloody and more akin to the battles that the 'Dukes' had fought in the First World War. Shells were now raining down on the Hook from artillery and mortars, from both the Chinese and UN forces. The Chinese launched a second attack but were cut down by heavy fire from the UN forces. Further attacks occurred on 28 May, but all were defeated in heavy fighting. Just 30 minutes into 29 May, the Chinese forces launched another attack but, as before, they were beaten back. Alma Company of 'The 'Dukes' then began advancing up the line of the original trenches to dislodge the remaining Chinese forces in the forward trenches. The 'Dukes' secured the Hook at 3:30 a.m. The 'Dukes' losses were three officers and 17 other ranks killed and two officers and 84 other ranks wounded, plus 20 other ranks missing.

The 'Dukes' embarked for Gibraltar on 13 November 1953, arriving on 10 December. In May 1954, during a visit to Gibraltar by Queen Elizabeth II and the Duke of Edinburgh, the Commanding Officer of the 'Dukes' (Lieutenant Colonel FR St P Bunbury) and a further 10 officers and other ranks received decorations for their actions in Korea.

== Post-Korean War (1956–2006) ==
=== Garrison duties ===
After the bloody encounters in the Korean War, the 'Dukes' were occupied by a series of garrison duties. The 'Dukes' were first deployed to Gibraltar, then to Cyprus in 1956, where they participated in so-called anti-terrorist operations against EOKA. The following year, the 'Dukes' deployed to Northern Ireland. They moved back to the mainland in 1959, joining the new UK Strategic Reserve, as part of 19 Infantry Brigade. On 6 August 1959 the Regimental Depot, at Wellesley Barracks, was closed down. training of new recruits was undertaken at the Kings Division depot at Strensall Barracks.

The 'Dukes' returned to the UK in 1970. Then deployed to Northern Ireland a number of times during The Troubles. In one deployment in 1972 three soldiers were killed.

In 1983 they provided the garrison regiment in Gibraltar.

In 1985, the 'Dukes' deployed to Belize for a six-month tour of duty, taking part in operation 'Holdfast'. In 1987 the 'Dukes' deployed again to Northern Ireland for a two-year tour, based in Palace Barracks, just outside the City of Belfast.

=== Bosnia (1994–1995) ===
In March 1994, the 'Dukes' deployed to Bosnia, with an area of responsibility covering Bugojno, Vitez, Travnik and the besieged enclave of Goražde. The latter was under siege for much of the war. It was declared a UN Safe Zone in that year. The 'Dukes' were one of the first units to enter the town. The regiment pushed the Bosnian-Serb Army from their positions around the town to a distance of over one mile. Their objective in doing this was to create a safe zone for the town. While at Goražde, Private Shaun Taylor of C Company was killed during an engagement with Bosnian-Serb forces while manning an observation post. The engagement lasted fifteen minutes, with over 2,000 rounds of ammunition being expended by the 'Dukes'. Seven of the Bosnian-Serb soldiers were killed in the fire-fight. Goražde remained a safe zone, being held by British troops from 1994 to 1995. It was the only safe zone to survive the war and avoided the tragedies that occurred in other UN safe zones such as Srebrenica and Žepa.

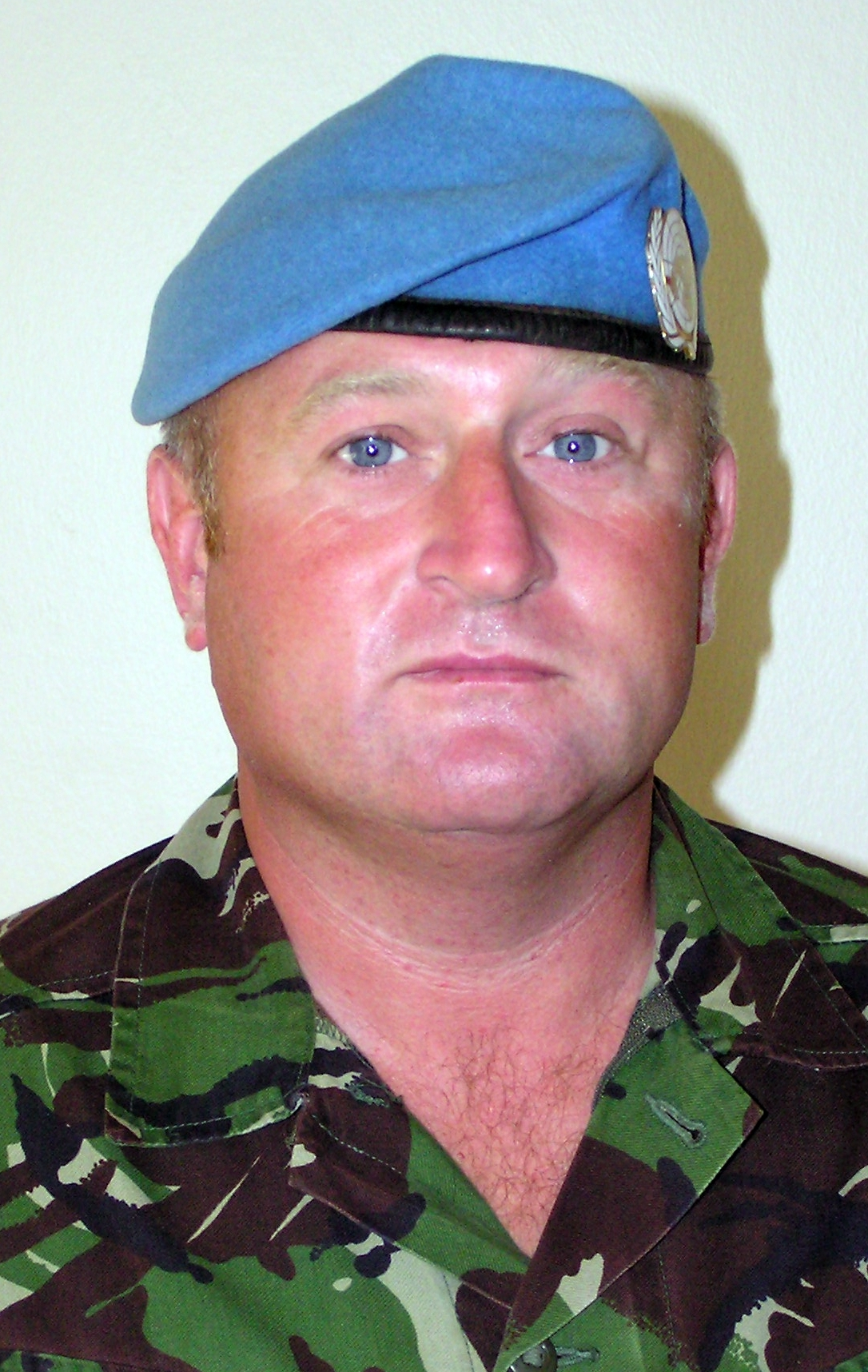
'C/Sgt Wayne Mills

Corporal Wayne Mills of the 1st Battalion became the first recipient of the Conspicuous Gallantry Cross, second only to the Victoria Cross. On (29 April 1994), a patrol led by Corporal Mills came under heavy small-arms fire from a group of Bosnian Serbs. The patrol returned fire, killing two of the attackers. The patrol then withdrew, but the attackers persisted in firing on the patrol. The patrol soon reached an open clearing, where it was obvious they would be highly vulnerable to fire from the attackers. Corporal Mills then performed an astonishing feat of bravery. He turned back and engaged the group in a fire-fight, delaying the attackers long enough to allow the rest of his patrol to cross the clearing. While doing this brave act, Corporal Mills shot the leader of the group, with the rest scattering into the woods. Due to that action he returned to his patrol safely, who were giving covering fire.

Lieutenant-Colonel David Santa-Olalla received the Distinguished Service Order for his inspirational leadership and courage during the 'Dukes' deployment to Bosnia. He arranged for the mutual withdrawal of both Serbian and Muslim forces, from the besieged town of Goražde, just as the Geneva talks were being held on the town.

=== 1995–2005 ===
In March 1995, the 'Dukes' were again posted to Northern Ireland for a two-year tour of duty. In March 1997, a composite company from the 1st Battalion was deployed to the Falkland Islands. In 1998, Corunna Company deployed for a tour of duty in South Armagh. During the period 1998–2000, the 1st Battalion served as a public duties unit in London.

In February 2001, a company from the 'Dukes' deployed to Kosovo, with the objective of preventing arms and munitions being transported from Albania into Kosovo, then onto the Former Yugolav Republic of Macedonia, now known as the Republic of Macedonia.

In 2003, the 'Dukes' were part of Operation Telic, the invasion of Iraq, as part of 1 (United Kingdom) Armoured Division. The 'Dukes' returned, as part of 4 (Armoured) Brigade, to the South-East of Iraq, in October 2004, to join the British-led Multi-National Division (South-East), as a fully equipped armoured infantry battalion with Warrior Armoured Personnel Carriers.

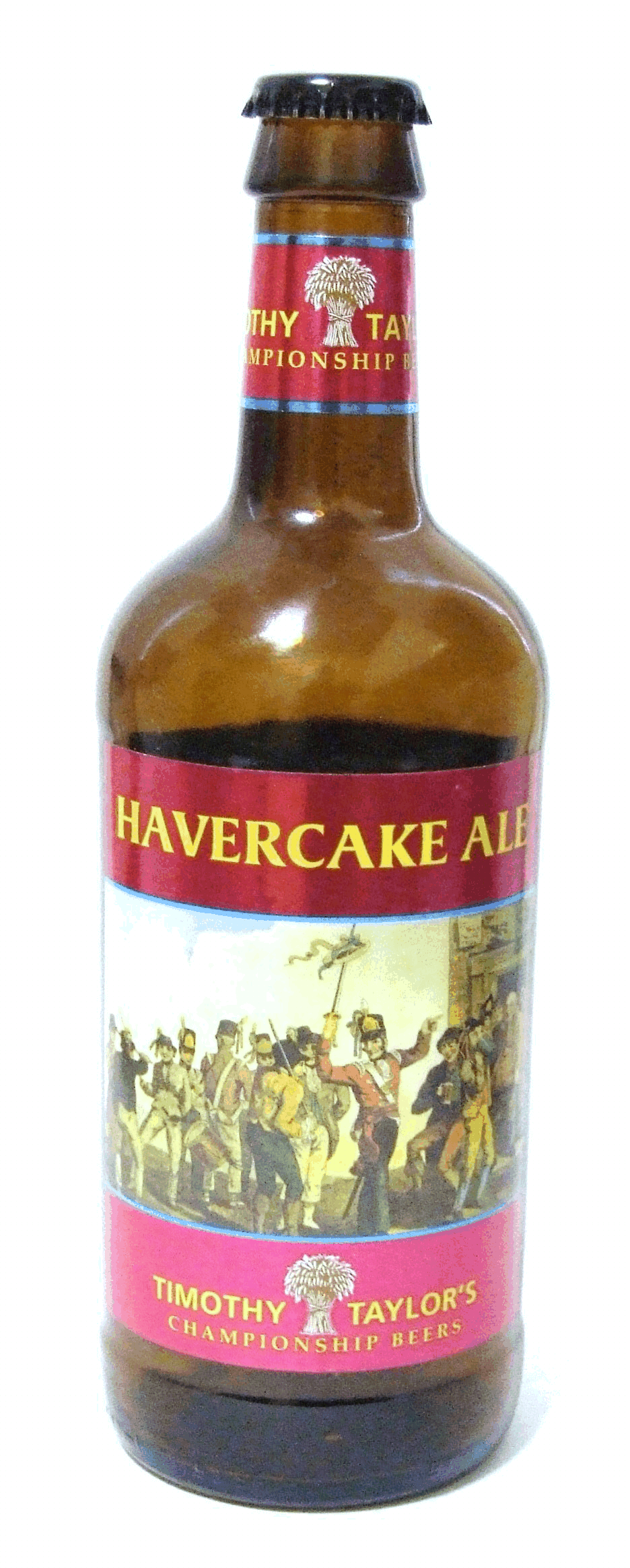
Havercake Ale

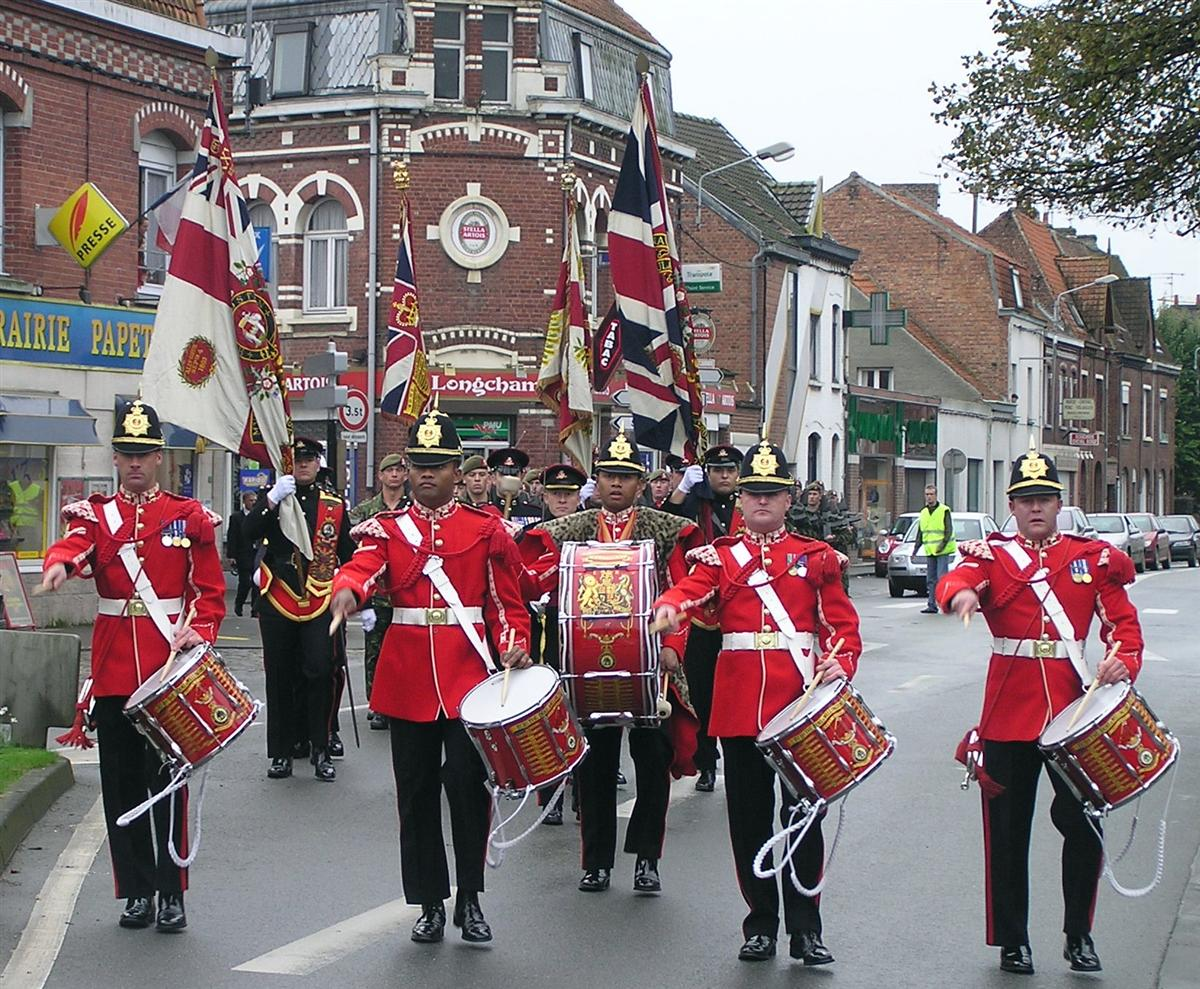
DWR Drums platoon lead the Regiment to Erquinghem-Lys Town Hall to receive the Keys to The town.

During 2003, in Osnabrück, Germany, where the 'Dukes' were then based, the regiment celebrated its 300th year in existence. Over 2000 past and present members converged on the town to take part in the celebrations. The 'Dukes' were presented with new colours by HM Queen Elizabeth II, represented by The Colonel of The Regiment Major-General Sir Evelyn John Webb-Carter KCB, due to the ill health of the Queen's representative, the regiment's Colonel-in-Chief the Duke of Wellington.

The regiment had a beer called Havercake Ale named in their honour by the Timothy Taylor Brewery, Keighley, to mark the regiment's tercentenary. Timothy Taylor, the founder of the brewery, had served in an antecedent unit of the regiment during 1859. Since then other members of the family and employees had also enlisted in the regiment.

On 12 November 2005, the regiment was awarded the "Keys to the Town" of Erquinghem-Lys in France.

=== Amalgamation ===
In December 2004, as part of the re-organisation of the infantry, it was announced that the Duke of Wellington's Regiment would be amalgamated with the Prince of Wales's Own Regiment of Yorkshire and the Green Howards', all Yorkshire-based regiments in the King's Division, to form the Yorkshire Regiment. The re-badging parade took place on 6 June 2006.

The 'Dukes' had five companies, named to commemorate five significant campaigns and battles, in which the 'Dukes' took part and were awarded a Battle honour, which have been retained by the battalion in the Yorkshire Regiment:

A Company — Alma — commemorating the Battle of Alma, during the Crimean War 1853–1856
B Company — Burma — commemorating the Burma Campaign, during the Second World War 1941–1944
C Company — Corunna — commemorating the Battle of Corunna, during the Peninsular War of 1809–1813
Support Company — Somme — commemorating the Battle of the Somme, during the First World War 1914–1918
Headquarter Company — Hook — commemorating the Battle of the Hook, during the Korean war 1952–1953

When required an additional rifle company was formed:- D Company – Dettingen – commemorating the Battle of Dettingen, during the War of the Austrian Succession in 1743 and an additional administration company:- W Company – Waterloo – commemorating the Battle of Waterloo, during the Waterloo campaign in 1815. Both companies having previously existed during the 'Dukes' existence.

=== 9th Battalion Veterans Annual reunion ===
For 65 years, Captain Sir Tom Moore organised the annual reunion for the 9th Battalion veterans.

== Regimental colours ==
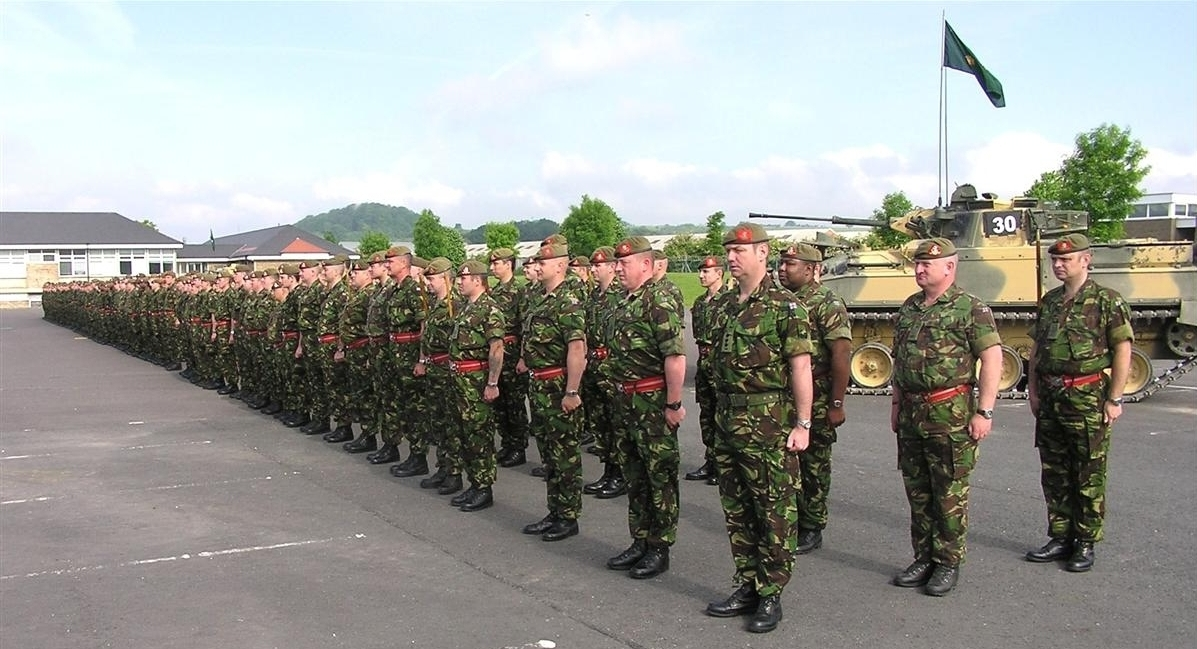
Dukes final morning parade before rebadging (6 June 2006)

The Duke of Wellington's Regiment had four colours on parade. The first pair of colours were the standard set of Regulation Colours, which all Regiments are presented with. The second pair was a set of Honorary Colours, which were originally presented by the East India Company to the 76th Regiment of Foot in 1808 for their actions during the Battle of Ally Ghur and Delhi in 1803.

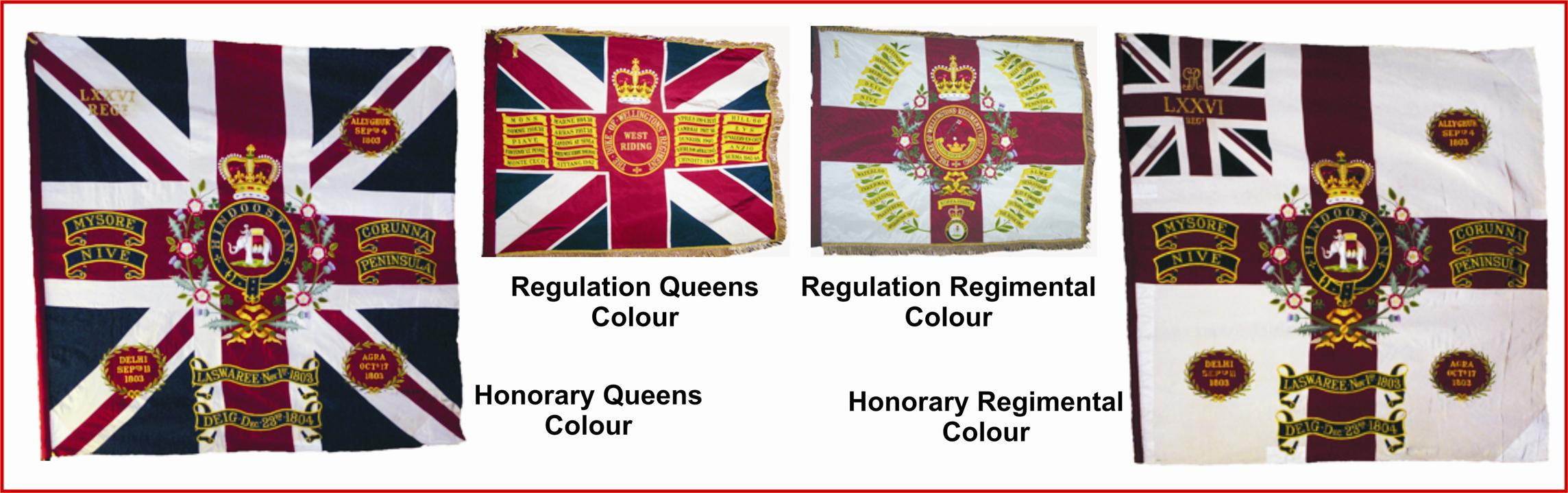
click on image to enlarge

The Honorary Colours were approximately 6-foot 6 inch by 6-foot. Following rebadging, on 6 June 2006, the 3rd Battalion the Yorkshire Regiment (Duke of Wellington's) inherited responsibility for parading the Honorary Colours. On 31 March 2007 the Regulation colours were taken out of service and laid up in Halifax Parish church. There was a short ceremony in the church grounds where the troops were inspected by the Mayor of Halifax, Councillor Colin Stout, and the Lord Lieutenant of West Yorkshire Dr Ingrid Roscoe.

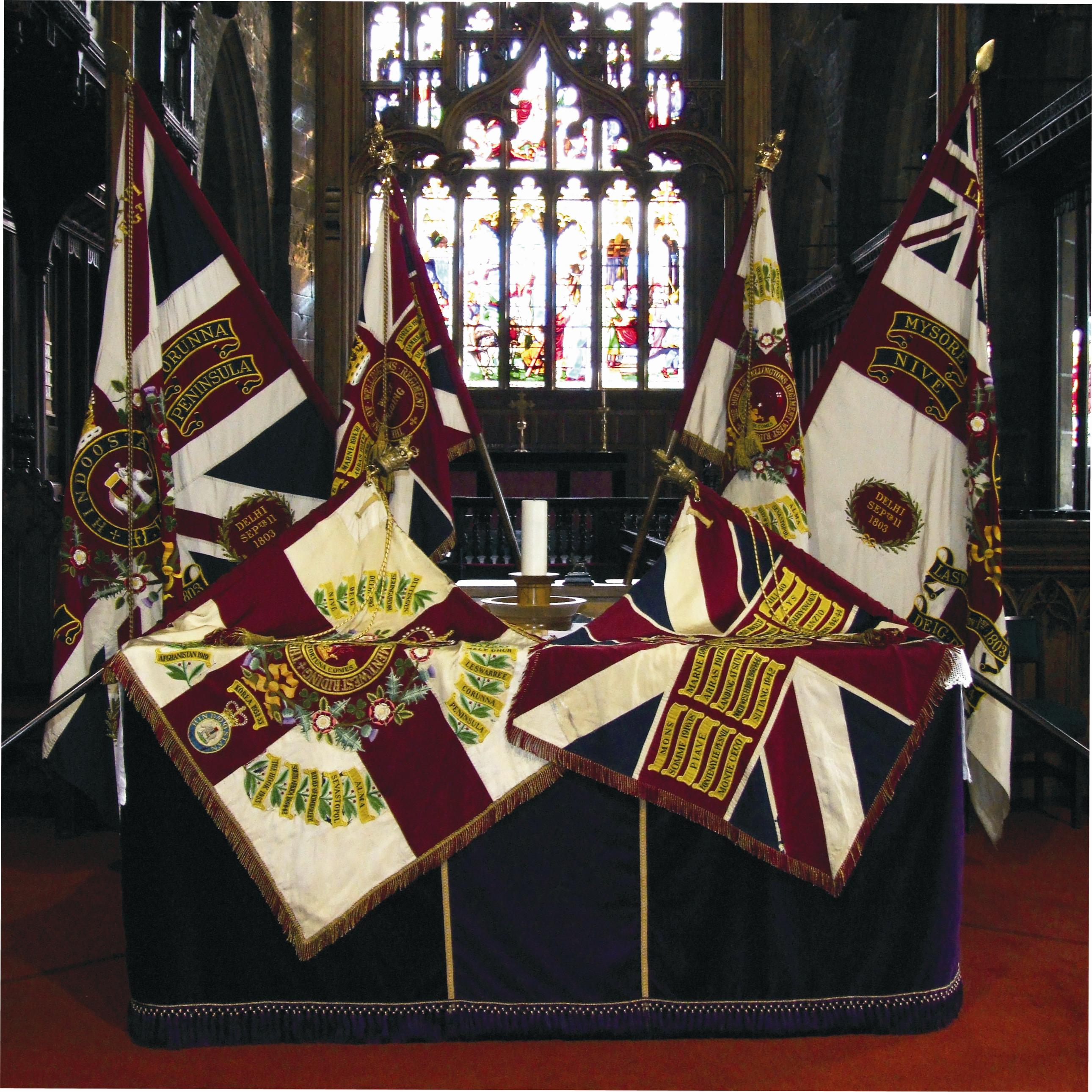
Regimental Colours of the 1st Battalion, Duke of Wellington's Regiment (West Riding), in Halifax Parish Church

== Regimental memorial ==
On 17 May 2019 a bronze memorial to the regiment, made by Devon sculptor, Andrew Sinclair, and his partner Diane, was unveiled, by the 9th Duke of Wellington in the Woolshops area of Halifax.

== Regimental museum ==
The Duke of Wellington's Regiment Museum is based at Bankfield House, in Halifax, Yorkshire.

== Battle honours ==
The regiment's battle honours were as follows:

- War of the Austrian Succession
  Dettingen
- India
  Hindoostan, Mysore, Seringapatam, Ally Ghur, Delhi 1803, Leswaree, Deig
- Spain:
  Corunna
- France:
  Nive, Peninsular
- Belgium
  Waterloo
- Crimean War:
  Alma, Inkerman, Sevastopol,
- Abyssinia:
  Abyssinia
- South Africa:
  Relief of Kimberley, Paardeberg, South Africa 1900–02
- First World War:
  Mons, Le Cateau, Retreat from Mons, Marne 1914 and 1918, Aisne 1914, La Bassée 1914, Ypres 1914, 1915 and 1917, Nonne Bosschen, Hill 60, Gravenstafel, St. Julien, Aubers, Somme 1916 and 1918, Albert 1916 and 1918, Bazentin, Delville Wood, Pozières, Flers-Courcelette, Morval, Thiepval, Le Transloy, Ancre Heights, Arras 1917 and 1918, Scarpe 1917 and 1918, Arleux, Bullecourt, Messines 1917 and 1918, Langemarck 1917, Menin Road, Polygon Wood, Broodseinde, Poelcappelle, Passchendaele, Cambrai 1917 and 1918, St Quentin, Ancre 1918, Lys, Estaires, Hazebrouck, Bailleul, Kemmel, Bethune, Scherpenberg, Tardenois, Amiens, Bapaume 1918, Drocourt-Quéant, Hindenburg Line, Havrincourt, Épehy, Canal du Nord, Selle, Valenciennes, Sambre, France and Flanders 1914–18, Piave, Vittorio Veneto, Italy 1917–18, Suvla, Landing at Suvla, Scimitar Hill, Gallipoli 1915, Egypt 1916–17
- Third Anglo-Afghan War
  Afghanistan 1919
- Second World War:
  Dunkirk 1940, St. Valery-en-Caux, Tilly sur Seulles, Odon, Fontenay Le Pesnil, North-West Europe 1940 and 1944–45, Banana Ridge, Medjez Plain, Gueriat el Atach Ridge, Tunis, Djebel Bou Aoukaz 1943, North Africa 1943, Anzio, Campoleone, Rome, Monte Ceco, Italy 1943–45, Sittang 1942, Paungde, Kohima, Chindits 1944, Burma Campaign (1942–44)
- Korea:
  The Hook 1953, Korea 1952–53
- Iraq:
  Iraq 2003 (Theatre Honour)

== Uniforms ==
On formation in 1702 as the Earl of Huntingdon's Regiment a red coat lined with yellow was worn, together with yellow breeches. Later in the 18th Century the coats had red facings but white linings which showed in the turn-backed skirts. For the remainder of its history the regiment was unusual in that the collars, cuffs and shoulder straps of its red coats were also red (most British regiments had facings of contrasting colours). This continued to be the case with the scarlet tunic worn by all ranks in full dress until 1914 and by bandsmen until amalgamation (see illustrations above). Officers were distinguished by silver buttons and braid until 1830 and thereafter by gold. After 1893 the badge of the Duke of Wellington was worn.

== Alliances ==
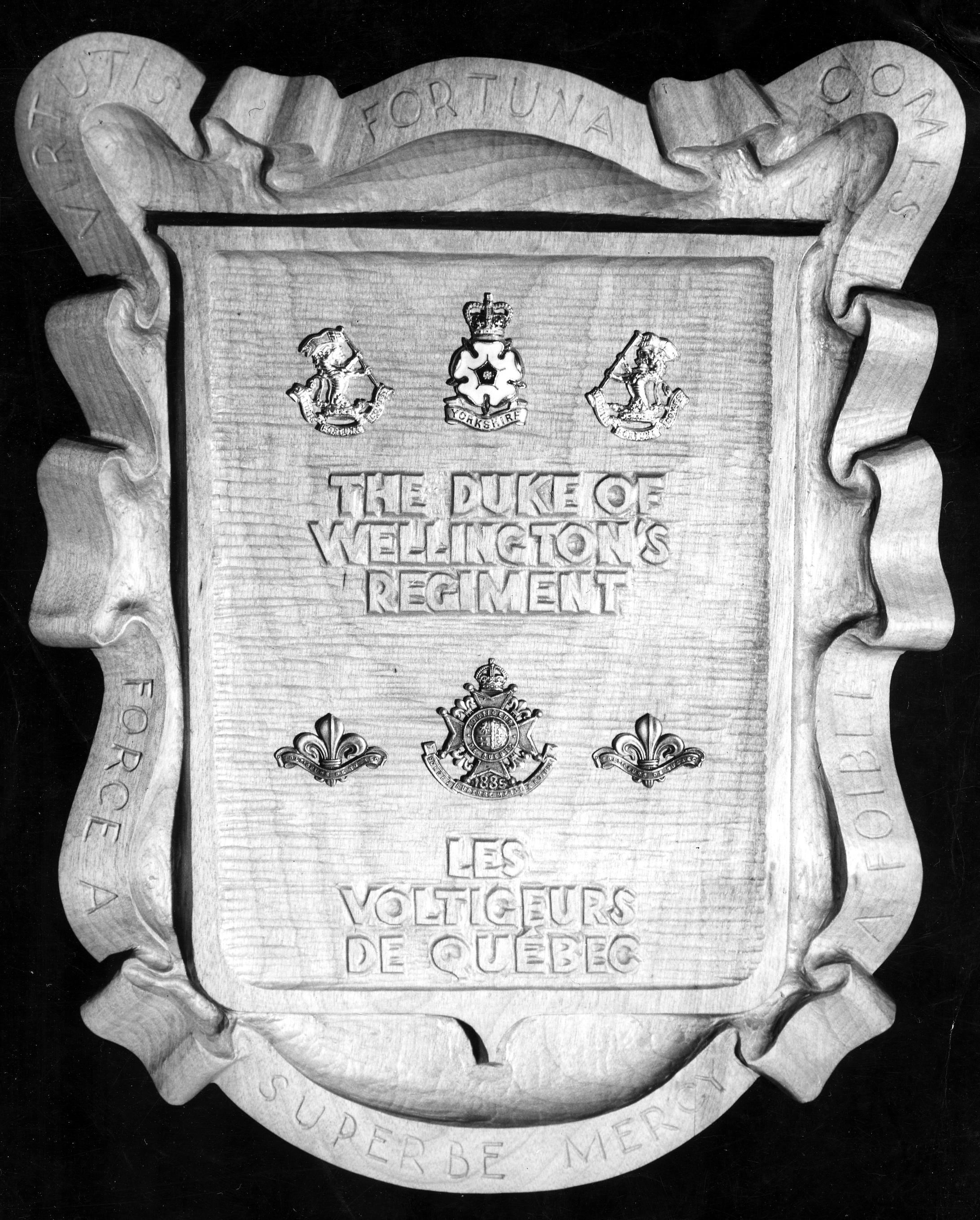
DWR & les Voltigeurs de Québec Regimental affiliation plague

- les Voltigeurs de Québec, Canada
- 10th Battalion, The Baloch Regiment, Pakistan
- HMS Iron Duke, Royal Navy

== Victoria Cross recipients ==
Victoria Cross recipients have been:

- Drummer Michael Magner
- Private James Bergin
- Sergeant James Firth
- Second Lieutenant James Palmer Huffam
- Second Lieutenant Henry Kelly
- Private Arnold Loosemore
- Private Arthur Poulter
- Private Richard Henry Burton
- Private Henry Tandey was awarded his VC for actions during his service with the 'Dukes' and donated his medals to the Regimental Museum in Halifax, West Yorkshire. On special occasions and parades he would sign them out to wear. The last time he signed them out he died. Unknowingly, the medals were sold and a private collector subsequently presented the medals to the Regimental Museum of The Green Howards, a regiment in which he had earlier served.
- Acting-Sergeant Hanson Victor Turner – originally a member of the regiment, he was serving with The West Yorkshire Regiment (The Prince of Wales's Own) when he was awarded his VC. When his medal was put up for sale it was purchased by the Halifax Town Council, as he was a Halifax resident. It is displayed in the Regimental Museum, in Halifax.

== Colonels of the Regiment ==
Colonels of the regiment have been:

- 1702–1703 Col George Hastings.
- 1703–1705 Col Henry Leigh.
- 1705–1705 Col Robert Duncanson (12 February to 8 May 1705).
- 1705–1717 F.M. George Wade.
- 1717–1730 Lt-Gen Henry Hawley.
- 1730–1739 Lt-Gen Robert Dalzell.
- 1739–1753 Lt-Gen John Johnson.

=== 33rd Regiment of Foot (1751) ===
- 1753–1760 Maj-Gen Lord Charles Hay.
- 1760–1766 F.M. John Griffin, 4th Baron Howard de Walden.
- 1766–1805 Gen Charles Cornwallis, 1st Marquess Cornwallis KG.

=== 33rd (1st Yorkshire West Riding) Regiment of Foot (1782) ===
- 1806–1812 F.M. Arthur Wellesley, 1st Duke of Wellington KG GCB GCH.
- 1813–1830 Gen John Coape Sherbrooke GCB.
- 1830–1831 Gen Lord Charles Somerset PC.
- 1831–1845 Gen Sir Charles Wale KCB.
- 1845–1847 Lieutenant General Sir Henry Sheehy Keating KCB.
- 1847–1855 General Henry D’Oyly.

=== 33rd (The Duke of Wellington's) Regiment of Foot (1853) ===
- 1855–1863 Field Marshal Sir Charles Yorke GCB.
- 1863–1881 General William Nelson Hutchinson.(continued below)

=== The Duke of Wellington's (West Riding Regiment) (1881) ===
* incorporating the 76th Regiment of Foot

- 1881–1895 General William Nelson Hutchinson (1st Battalion)
- 1881–1886 General Frederick Darley George CB. (2nd Battalion)
- 1895–1897 Maj-Gen George Elphinstone Erskine
- 1897–1909 Gen Hugh Rowlands VC KCB
- 1909–1934 Lt-Gen Sir Herbert Eversley Belfield KCB KCMG KBE DSO

=== The Duke of Wellington's Regiment (West Riding) (1921) ===
- 1934–1938 Brig-Gen Percy Alexander Turner CMG
- 1938–1947 Colonel Charles James Pickering CMG DSO
- 1947–1957 Gen Sir Alexander Frank Philip Christison, Bt, GBE CB DSO MC
- 1957–1965 Maj-Gen Kenneth Godfrey Exham KG CB DSO
- 1965–1975 Gen Sir Robert Napier Hubert Campbell Bray GBE KCB DSO
- 1975–1982 Maj-Gen Donald Edward Isles CB OBE
- 1982–1990 Gen Sir Charles Richard Huxtable KCB CBE
- 1990–1999 Brig William Richard Mundell OBE
- 1999–2006 Maj-Gen Sir Evelyn John Webb-Carter KCVO OBE

== Sport ==
The Duke of Wellington's Regiment (also known as the 'Dukes') maintained a notable rugby union tradition, producing 11 international players: seven for England, three for Scotland, and one for Ireland. Additionally, more than 50 of the regiment's players were capped for the British Army team in the Inter Services Championship against the Royal Navy and Royal Air Force after 1914.

For Rugby union they list:- Capt (Bull) Faithfull, England (3 Caps) 1924. Lieutenant WF (Horsey) Brown, Army & Ireland (12 Caps), 1925–1928. Captain Mike Campbell-Lamerton, Army, London Scottish, Scotland (23 Caps), British Lions in South Africa in 1962, Captain of the British Lions in Australia & New Zealand in 1966. Lieutenant CF Grieve and FJ Reynolds Toured South Africa in 1938 with the British Lions. In the early 1950s DW Shuttleworth and EMP Hardy provided the Half back pairing for England. Corporals Waqabaca and Ponjiasi played for Fiji. Brigadier DW Shuttleworth became the President of the English Rugby Football Union during the 1985/86 season. In 1957–1959, whilst stationed in Northern Ireland, the 'Dukes' played rugby throughout Ulster. At the end of the tour the Ulster Team honoured the regiment by playing them at Ravenhill, with the 'Dukes' winning 19 – 8. In 1960 during an emergency posting to Kenya the Kenyan Champions Nakuru heard the Dukes were there and challenged them to a match. The Kenya Regiment loaned them their team strip to wear. The 'Dukes' won the match.

The regiment's rugby league internationals include: Brian Curry, England, 1956; Norman Field, GB, 1963; Roy Sabine, GB; Jack Scroby, Army 1959, GB Halifax & Bradford Northern; Charlie Renilson, Scotland, GB, 1965 and Arthur 'Ollie' Keegan, GB.

Several members of the regiment played cricket for the Free Foresters Cricket Club and Pte Brian Stead played for the Yorkshire County Cricket Club.

== See also ==
- 76th Regiment of Foot
- Category:Duke of Wellington's Regiment officers
- East and West Riding Regiment
- Yorkshire Regiment
