= Wayne Mills (British Army soldier) =

British Army soldier

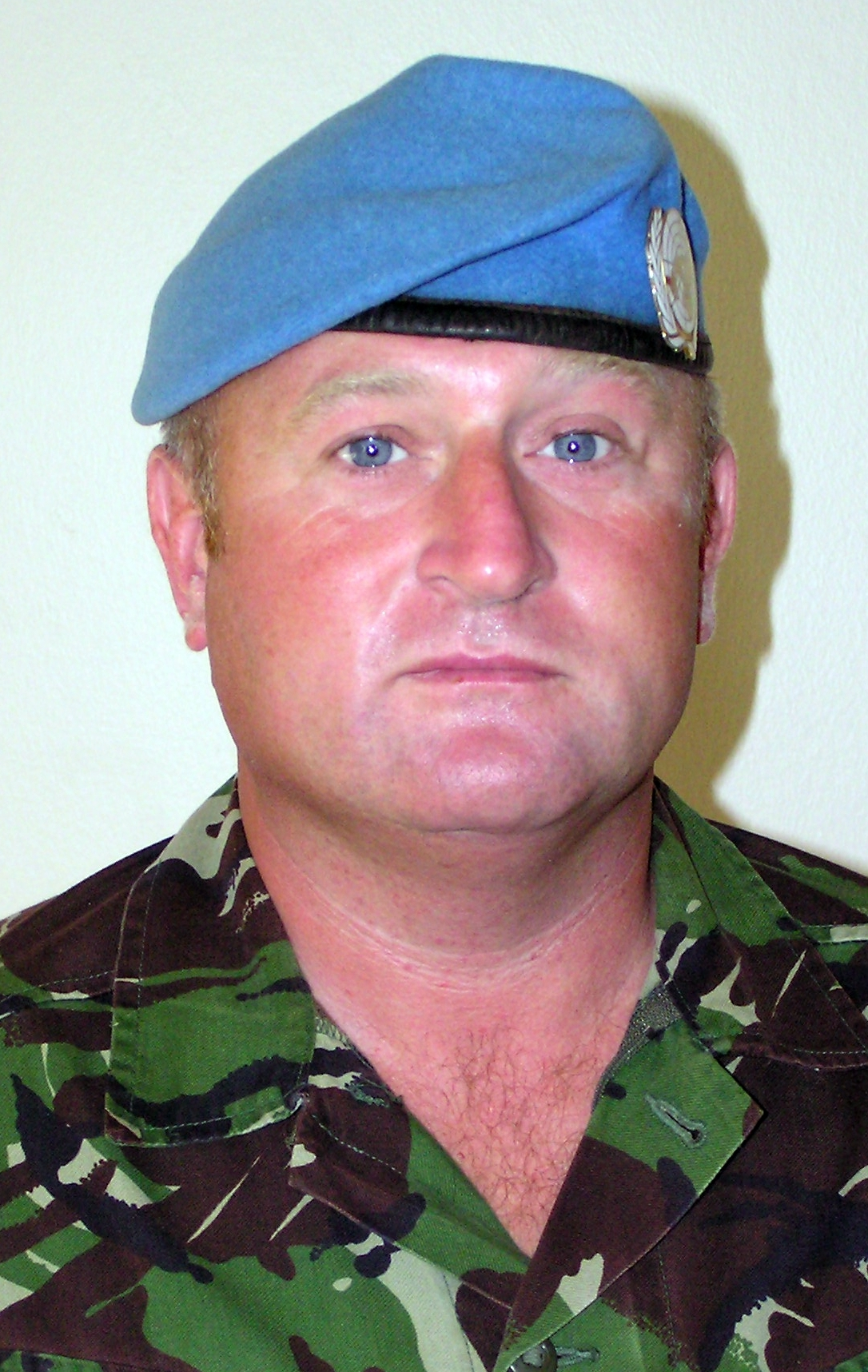
- Colour Sergeant Wayne Mills in 2004
- Military career
- Allegiance: United Kingdom
- Branch: British Army
- Service years: 1985–2007
- Rank: Colour Sergeant
- Unit: Duke of Wellington's Regiment
- Conflicts: Bosnian War
- Awards: Conspicuous Gallantry Cross

Wayne Kevin Mills CGC is a former British Army soldier. He was the first gazetted recipient of the Conspicuous Gallantry Cross for his actions during active operations in Bosnia in 1994.

While serving with the 1st Battalion The Duke of Wellington's Regiment (West Riding) on United Nations service in Bosnia on 29 April 1994, a patrol led by Corporal Mills came under heavy small-arms fire from a group of Bosnian Serbs. The patrol returned fire, killing two of the attackers. The patrol moved away back towards their base and soon reached an open clearing, where it was obvious they would be highly vulnerable to fire from the attackers. Mills then performed his feat of bravery. Turning around, back into the wood, he engaged the attacking group, delaying them long enough to allow the rest of his patrol to cross the clearing. Mills shot the leader of the group, causing the rest to scatter. He returned to his patrol safely.
