= Richard Henry Burton =

English Victoria Cross recipient (1923–1993)

- Born: 29 January 1923; Melton Mowbray, Leicestershire
- Died: 11 July 1993 (aged 70); Kirriemuir, Angus, Scotland
- Burial place: Kirriemuir Cemetery
- Military career
- Allegiance: United Kingdom
- Branch: British Army
- Service years: 1942–1945
- Rank: Corporal
- Service number: 5891907
- Units: Duke of Wellington's Regiment
- Conflicts: World War II
- Awards: Victoria Cross

Private Richard Henry Burton VC (29 January 1923 – 11 July 1993) was an English recipient of the Victoria Cross, the highest and most prestigious award for gallantry in the face of the enemy that can be awarded to British and Commonwealth forces.

== Details ==
Burton was 21 years old and a private in the 1st Battalion, Duke of Wellington's Regiment, British Army, during the Second World War at Monte Ceco, near Palazzuolo sul Senio, north-east of Florence when the following deed took place. It was for this that he was awarded the Victoria Cross.

The Citation reads:

In Italy on 8th October, 1944, two Companies of the Duke of Wellington's Regiment moved forward to take a strongly held feature 760 metres high. The capture of this feature was vital at this stage of the operation as it dominated all the ground on the main axis of advance.

The assaulting troops made good progress to within twenty yards of the crest when they came under withering fire from Spandaus on the crest. The leading platoon was held up and the Platoon Commander was wounded. The Company Commander took another platoon, of which Private Burton was runner, through to assault the crest from which four Spandaus at least were firing. Private Burton rushed forward and, engaging the first Spandau position with his Tommy gun, killed the crew of three. When the assault was again held up by murderous fire from two more machine guns Private Burton, again showing complete disregard for his own safety, dashed forward toward the first machine gun using his Tommy gun until his ammunition was exhausted. He then picked up a Bren gun and firing from the hip succeeded in killing or wounding the crews of the two machine guns. Thanks to his outstanding courage the Company was then able to consolidate on the forward slope of the feature.

The enemy immediately counter-attacked fiercely but Private Burton, in spite of most of his comrades being either dead or wounded, once again dashed forward on his own initiative and directed such accurate fire with his Bren gun on the enemy that they retired leaving the feature firmly in our hands.

The enemy later counter-attacked again on the adjoining platoon position and Private Burton, who had placed himself on the flank, brought such accurate fire to bear that this counterattack also failed to dislodge the Company from its position.

Private Burton's magnificent gallantry and total disregard of his own safety during many hours of fierce fighting in mud and continuous rain were an inspiration to all his comrades.

== Further information ==
Burton was born in Melton Mowbray, Leicestershire where he worked as a bricklayer. He moved to Scotland in later life. He achieved the rank of corporal.

== The medal ==
The medal is on display in the Lord Ashcroft Gallery, Imperial War Museum, London.
