= William Richard Mundell =

British Army general

- Born: 31 May; Leeds
- Died: 5 June 2021; York
- Children: William Timothy James Richard Barnaby Charles
- Military career
- Allegiance: United Kingdom
- Branch: British Army
- Service years: 1958–1992
- Rank: Brigadier
- Nickname: Dick
- Unit: 1DWR
- Commands: 1st Battalion Duke of Wellington's Regiment (West Riding); 6th Armoured Brigade
- Conflicts: The Troubles
- Awards: Officer of the Order of the British Empire
- Other work: Director of Communications - The Royal Armouries (Leeds)
- Website: https://royalarmouries.org/

Brigadier William Richard (Dick) Mundell OBE (died 5 June 2021) was a British Army officer and the penultimate colonel of the regiment of the Duke of Wellington's Regiment (West Riding), before their amalgamation into the Yorkshire Regiment, 3rd Battalion (Duke of Wellington's).

== Military career ==
Mundell was commissioned into the Duke of Wellington's Regiment (West Riding) on 19 December 1958. He commanded his Regiment on deployment in Northern Ireland in spring 1982 for which he was appointed an Officer of the Order of the British Empire.

He became commander of 6th Armoured Brigade in Soest, Germany, which he later transitioned into the UKs first Airmobile Brigade (6th Airmobile) in January 1983, Deputy Commander, North East District in July 1986 and Brigadier, Infantry for British Army of the Rhine in April 1988. He became colonel of the Duke of Wellington's Regiment (West Riding) in 1990.
