= St Paul's Street drill hall, Huddersfield =

Army Reserve Centre in Huddersfield, England

Huddersfield Drill Hall (Registered Charity number: 224671)
- Huddersfield
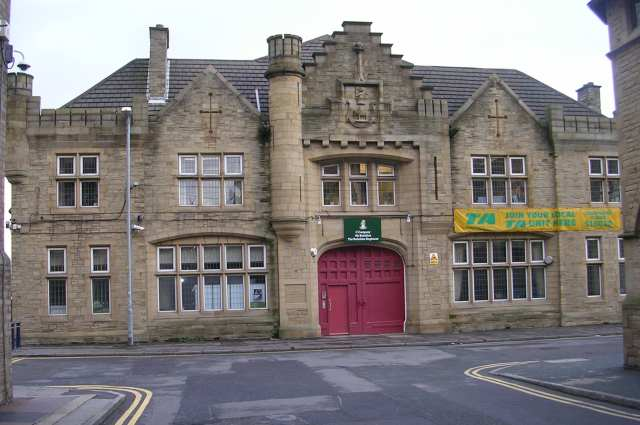
- Huddersfield Drill Hall

Site information
- Type: Drill Hall

Location
- Location in West Yorkshire
- Coordinates: 53.64255°N 1.77686°W

Site history
- Built: 1899–1901
- Built for: 2nd Vol. Batt. Duke of Wellington’s West Riding Regiment
- In use: 1901–Present

Garrison information
- Occupants: Corunna Company, 4th Battalion, The Royal Yorkshire Regiment

The St Paul's Street Drill Hall is an Army Reserve Centre in Huddersfield, West Yorkshire. It is a Grade II listed building.

== History ==
The building was designed by Captain Willey Cooper as the headquarters of the 2nd Volunteer Battalion, The Duke of Wellington's Regiment and was built between 1899 and 1901. It was opened by Field Marshal Lord Roberts in May 1901. The 2nd Volunteer Battalion, The Duke of Wellington's Regiment evolved to become the 5th Battalion, The Duke of Wellington's Regiment in 1908. The battalion was mobilised at the drill hall in August 1914 before being deployed to the Western Front.

The 5th Battalion, The Duke of Wellington's Regiment converted to become the 43rd (5th Duke of Wellington's Regiment) Anti-Aircraft Battalion, Royal Engineers in 1936 and, in the midst of the Second World War, it evolved to become the 600th Regiment, Royal Artillery (5th Battalion The Duke of Wellington's Regiment) in 1944, and, after the war, the 578th (5th Battalion The Duke of Wellington's) Heavy Anti-Aircraft Regiment, Royal Artillery in 1947. It then amalgamated with the 382nd Medium Regiment, Royal Artillery (Duke of Wellington's Regiment) in 1955, a unit which converted back to form the West Riding Battalion, The Duke of Wellington's Regiment (West Riding) at Huddersfield in 1961.

Following the reductions in 1967, the presence at the St Paul's Street drill hall was re-established by C (The Duke of Wellington's Regiment) Company, 3rd Battalion, Yorkshire Volunteers in 1971. This unit evolved to become C Company, 3rd Battalion, The Duke of Wellington's Regiment (West Riding) (Yorkshire Volunteers) in 1993, Ypres Company (Duke of Wellington's Regiment), The East and West Riding Regiment in 1999 and Corunna Company, 4th Battalion, The Yorkshire Regiment in 2006. The building remains an active Army Reserve Centre. It is also the home of the Huddersfield & District Veterans Association.
