= List of English Victoria Cross recipients =

The following is a partial list of English recipients of the Victoria Cross.

** Holders of VC and bar (twice awarded the VC).

Name	Service	Date	Conflict	Location
Arthur Louis Aaron	Royal Air Force	1943	Second World War	Turin
Alfred Ablett	British Army	1855	Crimean War	Sebastopol
Harold Ackroyd	British Army	1917	First World War	Ypres
James Ashworth	British Army	2012	War in Afghanistan	Nahr-e Saraj District, Helmand Province, Afghanistan
Abraham Acton	British Army	1914	First World War	Rouges Bancs
Henry Addison	British Army	1859	Indian Mutiny	Kurrereah
William Addison	British Army	1916	First World War	Sanna-i-Yat
Tom Edwin Adlam	British Army	1916	First World War	Thiepval
William Barnsley Allen	British Army	1916	First World War	Mesnil
William Wilson Allen	British Army	1879	Anglo-Zulu War	Rorke's Drift
Ernest Wright Alexander	British Army	1914	First World War	Elouges
Michael Allmand	British Army	1944	Second World War	Pin Hmi Road Bridge Mogaung
William Amey	British Army	1918	First World War	Landrecies
Charles Anderson	British Army	1858	Indian Mutiny	Sundeela Oudh
Eric Anderson	British Army	1943	Second World War	Wadi Akarit
John Anderson	British Army	1943	Second World War	Longstop Hill
Henry John Andrews	British Indian Army	1919	Waziristan campaign	Waziristan
Richard Wallace Annand	British Army	1940	Second World War	River Dyle
Thomas Arthur	British Army	1855	Crimean War	Sebastopol
Thomas Elsdon Ashford	British Army	1880	Second Anglo-Afghan War	Deh Khoja
Alfred Atkinson	British Army	1900	Second Anglo-Boer War	Paardeberg
Harold Auten	Royal Navy	1918	First World War	English Channel
Fenton John Aylmer	British Army	1891	Hunza-Nagar Campaign	Nilt Fort
Albert Ball	British Army	1917	First World War	Western Front
Edward Bamford	Royal Marines	1918	First World War	Zeebrugge
William George Hawtry Bankes	British Army	1858	Indian Mutiny	Lucknow
Edward Barber	British Army	1915	First World War	Neuve-Chapelle
Thomas Barratt	British Army	1917	First World War	Ypres
John Cridlan Barrett	British Army	1918	First World War	Pontruet
Cyril Joe Barton	Royal Air Force	1944	Second World War	Nuremberg
John Daniel Baskeyfield	British Army	1944	Second World War	Arnhem
Sidney Bates	British Army	1944	Second World War	Sourdeval
Arthur Batten-Pooll	British Army	1916	First World War	Colonne
Edward Felix Baxter	British Army	1916	First World War	Blairville
Daniel Marcus William Beak	British Army	1918	First World War	Logeast
Ernest Frederick Beal	British Army	1918	First World War	Saint-Léger
John Beeley	British Army	1941	Second World War	Sidi Rezegh
William Bees	British Army	1901	Second Anglo-Boer War	Moedwil
William Beesley	British Army	1918	First World War	Bucquoy
Harry Churchill Beet	British Army	1900	Second Anglo-Boer War	Wakkerstroom
Johnson Beharry	British Army	2004	Iraq War	Al Amarah
Douglas Walter Belcher	British Army	1915	First World War	Wieltje
Donald Simpson Bell	British Army	1916	First World War	Somme
Mark Sever Bell	British Army	1874	First Ashanti Expedition	Ordashu
Eugene Paul Bennett	British Army	1916	First World War	Le Transloy
Spencer John Bent	British Army	1914	First World War	Le Gheer
John Berryman	British Army	1854	Crimean War	Balaklava
Bertram Best-Dunkley	British Army	1917	First World War	Wieltje
Charles George Bonner	Royal Navy	1917	First World War	Bay of Biscay
Anthony Clarke Booth	British Army	1879	Anglo-Zulu War	Intombi River
Arthur Drummond Borton	British Army	1917	First World War	Sheria
William Ewart Boulter	British Army	1916	First World War	Trones Wood
Claud Thomas Bourchier	British Army	1854	Crimean War	Sebastopol
Duncan Gordon Boyes	Royal Navy	1864	Shimonoseki Campaign	Shimonoseki
Edward Courtney Boyle	Royal Navy	1915	First World War	Dardanelles
Edward Kinder Bradbury	British Army	1914	First World War	Néry
George Nicholson Bradford	Royal Navy	1918	First World War	Zeebrugge
Roland Boys Bradford	British Army	1916	First World War	Eaucourt L'Abbaye
Frederick Henry Bradley	British Army	1901	Second Anglo-Boer War	Itala
Joseph Charles Brennan	British Army	1858	Indian Mutiny	Jhansi
Gonville Bromhead	British Army	1879	Anglo-Zulu War	Rorke's Drift
Cuthbert Bromley	British Army	1915	First World War	Gallipoli
Edward Brooks	British Army	1917	First World War	Fayet
Oliver Brooks	British Army	1915	First World War	Loos
Edward Stevenson Browne	British Army	1879	Anglo-Zulu War	Inhlobana
John Henry Cound Brunt	British Army	1944	Second World War	Faenza
Thomas Bryan	British Army	1917	First World War	Arras
Angus Buchanan	British Army	1916	First World War	Falauyah
William Buckingham	British Army	1915	First World War	Neuve-Chapelle
Cecil Buckley	Royal Navy	1855	Crimean War	Sea of Azov
John Buckley	British Indian Army	1857	Indian Mutiny	Delhi
Redvers Henry Buller	British Army	1879	Anglo-Zulu War	Inhlobana
Daniel Burges	British Army	1918	First World War	Jumeaux
William Francis Burman	British Army	1917	First World War	Ypres
Alfred Alexander Burt	British Army	1915	First World War	Cuinchy
Richard Henry Burton	British Army	1944	Second World War	Monte Ceco
Nathaniel Burslem	British Army	1860	Second Opium War	Taku Forts
Christopher Bushell	British Army	1918	First World War	Tergnier
John Fitzhardinge Paul Butler	British Army	1914	First World War	Cameroons
Thomas Adair Butler	British Army	1858	Indian Mutiny	Lucknow
William Boynton Butler	British Army	1917	First World War	Lempire
John Bythesea	Royal Navy	1854	Crimean War	Åland
William Martin Cafe	British Indian Army	1858	Indian Mutiny	Fort Ruhya
Robert Henry Cain	British Army	1944	Second World War	Arnhem
George Albert Cairns	British Army	1944	Second World War	Henu Block
Laurence Calvert	British Army	1918	First World War	Havrincourt
Gordon Campbell	Royal Navy	1917	First World War	Atlantic
John Henry Carless	Royal Navy	1917	First World War	Heligoland
James Carne	British Army	1951	Korean War	Imjin River
Alfred Francis Blakeney Carpenter	Royal Navy	1918	First World War	Zeebrugge
Herbert Augustine Carter	British Indian Army	1903	Third Somaliland Expedition	Jidballi
Nelson Victor Carter	British Army	1916	First World War	Richebourg-l'Avoué
Bernard Matthew Cassidy	British Army	1918	First World War	Arras
George Edward Cates	British Army	1917	First World War	Bouchavesnes
Geoffrey St George Shillington Cather	British Army	1916	First World War	Hamel
Harry Cator	British Army	1917	First World War	Arras
George William Chafer	British Army	1916	First World War	Méaulte
James Champion	British Army	1858	Indian Mutiny	Beejapore
John Worthy Chaplin	British Army	1860	Second Opium War	Taku Forts
John Rouse Merriott Chard	British Army	1879	Anglo-Zulu War	Rorke's Drift
Edward Colquhoun Charlton	British Army	1945	Second World War	Wistedt
Noel Godfrey Chavasse**	British Army	1916; 1917	First World War; First World War	Guillemont; Wieltje
Leonard Geoffrey Cheshire	Royal Air Force	1944	Second World War	Germany
George Bell Chicken	Civilian	1858	Indian Mutiny	Suhejnee
Harry Christian	British Army	1915	First World War	Cuinchy
George William Burdett Clare	British Army	1917	First World War	Bourlon Wood
James Clarke	British Army	1918	First World War	Happegarbes
Henry Hugh Clifford	British Army	1854	Crimean War	Inkerman
Brett Mackay Cloutman	British Army	1918	First World War	Pont-sur-Sambre
Clifford Coffin	British Army	1917	First World War	Westhoek
John Coleman	British Army	1855	Crimean War	Sebastopol
Harold John Colley	British Army	1918	First World War	Martinpuich
Joseph Henry Collin	British Army	1918	First World War	Givenchy
John Stanhope Collings-Wells	British Army	1918	First World War	Marcoing
John Collins	British Army	1917	First World War	Wadi Saba
James Collis	British Army	1880	Second Anglo-Afghan War	Maiwand
William Harold Coltman	British Army	1918	First World War	Mannequin Hill
Herbert George Columbine	British Army	1918	First World War	Hervilly Wood
James Morris Colquhoun Colvin	British Army	1897	Mohmand Campaign	Mohmand Valley
Hugh Colvin	British Army	1917	First World War	Ypres
Thomas Riversdale Colyer-Fergusson	British Army	1917	First World War	Bellewaarde
John Edmund Commerell	Royal Navy	1855	Crimean War	Sea of Azov
Walter Congreve	British Army	1899	Second Anglo-Boer War	Colenso
Billy Congreve	British Army	1916	First World War	Longueval
William Connolly	British Indian Army	1857	Indian Mutiny	Jhelum
Walter Cook	British Army	1859	Indian Mutiny	Maylah Ghat
Edger Christopher Cookson	Royal Navy	1915	First World War	Kut-el-Amara
Edward Cooper	British Army	1917	First World War	Langemarck
Henry Cooper	Royal Navy	1855	Crimean War	Taganrog
James Cooper	British Army	1867	Andaman Islands Expedition	Little Andaman
Frederick Corbett	British Army	1882	Anglo-Egyptian War	Kafr Dowar
John Travers Cornwell	Royal Navy	1916	First World War	Jutland
William Richard Cotter	British Army	1916	First World War	Hohenzollern Redoubt
Gustavus Hamilton Blenkinsopp Coulson	British Army	1901	Second Anglo-Boer War	Lambrechtfontein
Jack Thomas Counter	British Army	1918	First World War	Boisleux-Saint-Marc
Gabriel George Coury	British Army	1916	First World War	Arrow Head Copse
Charles Harry Coverdale	British Army	1917	First World War	Poelcapelle
Christopher Augustus Cox	British Army	1917	First World War	Achiet-le-Grand
Harry George Crandon	British Army	1901	Second Anglo-Boer War	Springbok Laagte
Thomas Crisp	Royal Navy	1917	First World War	North Sea
Arthur Henry Cross	British Army	1918	First World War	Ervillers
John James Crowe	British Army	1918	First World War	Neuve Eglise
Victor Alexander Charles Crutchley	Royal Navy	1918	First World War	Ostend
William George Cubitt	British Indian Army	1857	Indian Mutiny	Chinhut
John Cunningham	British Army	1916	First World War	Hébuterne
Albert Edward Curtis	British Army	1900	Second Anglo-Boer War	Onderbank Spruit
Henry Curtis	Royal Navy	1855	Crimean War	Sebastopol
Horace Augustus Curtis	British Army	1918	First World War	Le Cateau
Philip Curtis	British Army	1951	Korean War	Imjin River
James Langley Dalton	British Army	1879	Anglo-Zulu War	Rorke's Drift
Frederick George Dancox	British Army	1917	First World War	Boesinghe
Edward St. John Daniel	Royal Navy	1854	Crimean War	Sebastopol
Harry Daniels	British Army	1915	First World War	Neuve-Chapelle
John Thomas Davies	British Army	1918	First World War	Eppeville
Joseph John Davies	British Army	1916	First World War	Delville Wood
Richard Bell Davies	Royal Navy	1915	First World War	Ferrijik Junction
Gronow Davis	British Army	1855	Crimean War	Sebastopol
George Fiott Day	Royal Navy	1855	Crimean War	Genitichi
Sidney James Day	British Army	1917	First World War	Hargicourt
Raymond de Montmorency	British Army	1898	Mahdist War	Omdurman
Frank Alexander de Pass	British Indian Army	1914	First World War	Festubert
Donald John Dean	British Army	1918	First World War	Lens
Percy Thompson Dean	Royal Navy	1918	First World War	Zeebrugge
John Henry Stephen Dimmer	British Army	1914	First World War	Klein Zillebeke
Claude Congreve Dobson	Royal Navy	1919	North Russia Relief Force	Kronstadt
Frederick William Dobson	British Army	1914	First World War	Chavanne
Dennis Donnini	British Army	1945	Second World War	Stein, Selfkant
George Thomas Dorrell	British Army	1914	First World War	Néry
Eric Stuart Dougall	British Army	1918	First World War	Messines
Charles Hotham Montagu Doughty-Wylie	British Army	1915	First World War	Gallipoli
Henry Edward Manning Douglas	British Army	1899	Second Anglo-Boer War	Magersfontein
George Dare Dowell	Royal Marines	1855	Crimean War	Fort of Viborg
John Thornton Down	British Army	1863	New Zealand Wars	Poutoko
Alexis Charles Doxat	British Army	1900	Second Anglo-Boer War	Zeerust
Job Henry Charles Drain	British Army	1914	First World War	Le Cateau
Alfred George Drake	British Army	1915	First World War	La Brique
Tom Dresser	British Army	1917	First World War	Rœux
George Leslie Drewry	Royal Navy	1915	First World War	Gallipoli
Geoffrey Heneage Drummond	Royal Navy	1918	First World War	Ostend
Frederic Brooks Dugdale	British Army	1901	Second Anglo-Boer War	Derby
John Spencer Dunville	British Army	1917	First World War	Épehy
Alfred Edward Durrant	British Army	1900	Second Anglo-Boer War	Bergendal
Thomas Frank Durrant	British Army	1942	Second World War	Saint-Nazaire
Edward Dwyer	British Army	1915	First World War	Hill 60
George Harold Eardley	British Army	1944	Second World War	Overloon
Thomas Edwards	British Army	1884	Mahdist War	Tamai
Wilfred Edwards	British Army	1917	First World War	Langemarck
William Mordaunt Marsh Edwards	British Army	1882	Anglo-Egyptian War	Tel-el-Kebir
Ernest Albert Egerton	British Army	1917	First World War	Ypres
Roland Edward Elcock	British Army	1918	First World War	Capelle St. Catherine
Neville Elliott-Cooper	British Army	1917	First World War	La Vacquerie
Wilfrith Elstob	British Army	1918	First World War	Saint-Quentin, Aisne
Frederick Cockayne Elton	British Army	1855	Crimean War	Sebastopol
Henry William Engleheart	British Army	1900	Second Anglo-Boer War	Bloemfontein
Eugene Esmonde	Royal Navy	1942	Second World War	Strait of Dover
Arthur Evans	British Army	1918	First World War	Étaing
George Evans	British Army	1916	First World War	Guillemont
Joseph John Farmer	British Army	1881	First Anglo-Boer War	Majuba Mountain
Edward Stephen Fogarty Fegen	Royal Navy	1940	Second World War	Atlantic
Norman Augustus Finch	Royal Marines	1918	First World War	Zeebrugge
Humphrey Osbaldston Brooke Firman	Royal Navy	1916	First World War	Kut-el-Amara
James Firth	British Army	1900	Second Anglo-Boer War	Arundel, Cape Colony
Thomas Flawn	British Army	1879	Sekukuni Campaign	Sekukuni's Town
Arthur James Terence Fleming-Sandes	British Army	1915	First World War	Hohenzollern Redoubt
James Forbes-Robertson	British Army	1918	First World War	Vieux Berquin
William Thomas Forshaw	British Army	1915	First World War	Gallipoli
George Vincent Fosbery	British Indian Army	1863	Umbeyla Campaign	Crag Picquet
Charles Calveley Foss	British Army	1915	First World War	Neuve-Chapelle
Edward Foster	British Army	1917	First World War	Villers-Plouich
Charles Craufurd Fraser	British Army	1858	Indian Mutiny	River Raptee
Ian Edward Fraser	Royal Navy	1945	Second World War	Johore Straits
John Freeman	British Army	1857	Indian Mutiny	Agra
Cyril Hubert Frisby	British Army	1918	First World War	Canal du Nord
Wilfred Dolby Fuller	British Army	1915	First World War	Neuve-Chapelle
William Charles Fuller	British Army	1914	First World War	Chivy-sur-Aisne
The Hon. Christopher Furness	British Army	1940	Second World War	Arras
James Henry Fynn	British Army	1916	First World War	Sanna-i-Yat
Philip John Gardner	British Army	1941	Second World War	Tobruk
Charles Ernest Garforth	British Army	1914	First World War	Harmignies
Benjamin Handley Geary	British Army	1915	First World War	Hill 60
Robert Gee	British Army	1917	First World War	Masnières
Guy Penrose Gibson	Royal Air Force	1943	Second World War	Möhne Dam
Edric Frederick, The Lord Gifford	British Army	1873	First Ashanti Expedition	Becquah
Albert Gill	British Army	1916	First World War	Delville Wood
Horace Henry Glasock	British Army	1900	Second Anglo-Boer War	Sanna's Post
William Goate	British Army	1858	Indian Mutiny	Lucknow
Sidney Frank Godley	British Army	1914	First World War	Mons
Charles Augustus Goodfellow	British Indian Army	1859	Indian Mutiny	Fort of Beyt
Gerald Goodlake	British Army	1854	Crimean War	Inkerman
Robert Vaughan Gorle	British Army	1918	First World War	Ledeghem
James Gorman	Royal Navy	1854	Crimean War	Inkerman
William Gosling	British Army	1917	First World War	Arras
Thomas William Gould	Royal Navy	1942	Second World War	Crete
Cyril Edward Gourley	British Army	1917	First World War	Épehy
Gerald Graham	British Army	1855	Crimean War	Sebastopol
Robert Grant	British Army	1857	Indian Mutiny	Alambagh
Thomas Gray	Royal Air Force	1940	Second World War	Albert Canal
John Hollington Grayburn	British Army	1944	Second World War	Arnhem
Fred Greaves	British Army	1917	First World War	Poelcapelle
John Leslie Green	British Army	1916	First World War	Foncquevillers
Harry Greenwood	British Army	1918	First World War	Ovillers
William Gregg	British Army	1918	First World War	Bucquoy
Francis Octavus Grenfell	British Army	1914	First World War	Audregnies
Julian Royds Gribble	British Army	1918	First World War	Beaumetz
William Henry Grimbaldeston	British Army	1917	First World War	Wijdendrift
John Elisha Grimshaw	British Army	1915	First World War	Gallipoli
George William St. George Grogan	British Army	1918	First World War	River Aisne
John Guise	British Army	1857	Indian Mutiny	Lucknow
George Ward Gunn	British Army	1941	Second World War	Sidi Rezegh
Basil John Douglas Guy	Royal Navy	1900	Boxer Rebellion	Tientsin
William Hackett	British Army	1916	First World War	Givenchy
Reginald Leonard Haine	British Army	1917	First World War	Gavrelle
Thomas Egerton Hale	British Army	1855	Crimean War	Sebastopol
Lewis Halliday	Royal Marines	1900	Boxer Rebellion	Peking
Joel Halliwell	British Army	1918	First World War	Muscourt
Rupert Price Hallowes	British Army	1915	First World War	Hooge
Albert Halton	British Army	1917	First World War	Poelcapelle
Arthur George Hammond	British Indian Army	1879	Second Anglo-Afghan War	Asmai Heights
Harry Hampton	British Army	1900	Second Anglo-Boer War	Van Wyk's Vlei
Thomas Hancock	British Army	1857	Indian Mutiny	Delhi
Henry Eric Harden	British Army	1945	Second World War	Brachterbeek
Israel Harding	Royal Navy	1882	Anglo-Egyptian War	Alexandria
Theodore Bailey Hardy	British Army	1918	First World War	Bucquoy
Hastings Edward Harrington	British Indian Army	1857	Indian Mutiny	Lucknow
John Pennington Harman	British Army	1944	Second World War	Kohima
John William Harper	British Army	1944	Second World War	Antwerp
Thomas James Harris	British Army	1918	First World War	Morlancourt
Arthur Leyland Harrison	Royal Navy	1918	First World War	Zeebrugge
John Harrison	British Army	1917	First World War	Oppy
Francis John William Harvey	Royal Marines	1916	First World War	Jutland
Jack Harvey	British Army	1918	First World War	Peronne
Norman Harvey	British Army	1918	First World War	Ingoyghem
Samuel Harvey	British Army	1915	First World War	Hohenzollern Redoubt
Lanoe George Hawker	British Army	1915	First World War	Western Front
David Hawkes	British Army	1858	Indian Mutiny	Lucknow
Alfred Spencer Heathcote	British Army	1857	Indian Mutiny	Delhi
William Edward Heaton	British Army	1900	Second Anglo-Boer War	Geluk, South Africa
Michael Heaviside	British Army	1917	First World War	Fontaine-lès-Croisilles
Clement Walker Heneage	British Army	1858	Indian Mutiny	Gwalior
Andrew Henry	British Army	1854	Crimean War	Inkerman
Alfred Cecil Herring	British Army	1918	First World War	Montagne Bridge
William Nathan Wrighte Hewett	Royal Navy	1854	Crimean War	Sebastopol
James Hewitson	British Army	1918	First World War	Givenchy
Dennis George Wyldbore Hewitt	British Army	1917	First World War	Ypres
Alan Richard Hill	British Army	1881	First Anglo-Boer War	Laing's Nek
Albert Hill	British Army	1916	First World War	Delville Wood
James Hills	British Indian Army	1857	Indian Mutiny	Delhi
George Hinckley	Royal Navy	1862	Taiping Rebellion	Fung Wha
David Philip Hirsch	British Army	1917	First World War	Wancourt
Frederick Hitch	British Army	1879	Anglo-Zulu War	Rorke's Drift
John Hogan	British Army	1914	First World War	Festubert
Norman Douglas Holbrook	Royal Navy	1914	First World War	Dardanelles
George Hollis	British Army	1858	Indian Mutiny	Gawlior
Stanley Elton Hollis	British Army	1944	Second World War	Normandy
James Hollowell	British Army	1857	Indian Mutiny	Lucknow
Frederick William Holmes	British Army	1914	First World War	Le Cateau
Joel Holmes	British Army	1857	Indian Mutiny	Lucknow
William Edgar Holmes	British Army	1918	First World War	Cattenières
Alfred Henry Hook	British Army	1879	Anglo-Zulu War	Rorke's Drift
Alexander Hore-Ruthven	British Army	1898	Mahdist War	Gedarif
Ernest George Horlock	British Army	1914	First World War	Vendresse
Alec George Horwood	British Army	1944	Second World War	Kyauchaw
William House	British Army	1900	Second Anglo-Boer War	Mosilikatse Nek
Charles Edward Hudson	British Army	1918	First World War	Asiago
Mathew Hughes	British Army	1855	Crimean War	Sebastopol
Charles Hull	British Army	1915	First World War	Hafiz Kor
Robert Humpston	British Army	1855	Crimean War	Woronzoff Road
James Hutchinson	British Army	1916	First World War	Ficheux
Arthur Hutt	British Army	1917	First World War	Poelcapelle
Alfred Ernest Ind	British Army	1901	Second Anglo-Boer War	Tafelkop
Harold Jackson	British Army	1918	First World War	Hermies
Norman Cyril Jackson	Royal Air Force	1944	Second World War	Schweinfurt
Thomas Norman Jackson	British Army	1918	First World War	Canal du Nord
Herbert James	British Army	1915	First World War	Gallipoli
Manley Angell James	British Army	1918	First World War	Velu Wood
David Auldjo Jamieson	British Army	1944	Second World War	Grimbosq
George Jarratt	British Army	1917	First World War	Pelves
Joseph Jee	British Army	1857	Indian Mutiny	Lucknow
Francis Arthur Jefferson	British Army	1944	Second World War	Monte Cassino
Alan Jerrard	British Army	1918	First World War	Mansuè
Dudley Graham Johnson	British Army	1918	First World War	Sambre–Oise Canal
Frederick Henry Johnson	British Army	1915	First World War	Hill 70
James Johnson	British Army	1918	First World War	Wez Macquart
William Henry Johnson	British Army	1918	First World War	Ramicourt
Alfred Stowell Jones	British Army	1857	Indian Mutiny	Delhi
David Jones	British Army	1916	First World War	Guillemont
Herbert Jones	British Army	1982	Falklands War	Goose Green
Loftus William Jones	Royal Navy	1916	First World War	Jutland
Richard Basil Brandram Jones	British Army	1916	First World War	Vimy
Thomas Alfred Jones	British Army	1916	First World War	Morval
William Jones	British Army	1879	Anglo-Zulu War	Rorke's Drift
Eustace Jotham	British Indian Army	1915	North-West Frontier Province	Spina
Joseph Kellaway	Royal Navy	1855	Crimean War	Sea of Azov
Henry Kelly	British Army	1916	First World War	Le Sars
Paul Aloysius Kenna	British Army	1898	Mahdist War	Khartoum
John Patrick Kenneally	British Army	1943	Second World War	Dj. Arada
Thomas Kenny	British Army	1915	First World War	La Houssoie
Henry Edward Kenny	British Army	1915	First World War	Loos
Leonard James Keyworth	British Army	1915	First World War	Givenchy
Arthur Forbes Gordon Kilby	British Army	1915	First World War	Cuinchy
Frank Howard Kirby	British Army	1900	Second Anglo-Boer War	Delagoa Bay
James Kirk	British Army	1918	First World War	Ors
John Kirk	British Army	1857	Indian Mutiny	Benares
Alfred Joseph Knight	British Army	1917	First World War	Ypres
Henry James Knight	British Army	1900	Second Anglo-Boer War	Van Wyk's Vlei
George Arthur Knowland	British Army	1945	Second World War	Kangaw
Cecil Leonard Knox	British Army	1918	First World War	Tugny
Alexander Malins Lafone	British Army	1917	First World War	Beersheba
Arthur Moore Lascelles	British Army	1917	First World War	Masnières
Brian Turner Tom Lawrence	British Army	1900	Second Anglo-Boer War	Essenbosch Farm
Edward Lawson	British Army	1897	Tirah Campaign	Dargai Heights
James Leach	British Army	1914	First World War	Festubert
Joshua Leakey	British Army	2015	War in Afghanistan	Bar Now Zad, Helmand Province, Afghanistan
Roderick Alastair Brook Learoyd	Royal Air Force	1940	Second World War	Dortmund–Ems Canal
Wilbraham Oates Lennox	British Army	1854	Crimean War	Sebastopol
Edmund Henry Lenon	British Army	1860	Second Opium War	Taku Forts
Frank Lester	British Army	1918	First World War	Neuvilly
Leonard Allan Lewis	British Army	1918	First World War	Rossnoy
John Aiden Liddell	British Army	1915	First World War	Ostend
Joseph Lister	British Army	1917	First World War	Ypres
Isaac Lodge	British Army	1900	Second Anglo-Boer War	Korn Spruit
Arnold Loosemore	British Army	1917	First World War	Langemarck
Stewart Walter Loudoun-Shand	British Army	1916	First World War	Fricourt
John Lynn	British Army	1915	First World War	Ypres
Henry Lysons	British Army	1879	Anglo-Zulu War	Zlobane Mountain
William Job Maillard	Royal Navy	1898	1898 Occupation of Crete	Crete
George Allen Maling	British Army	1915	First World War	Fauquissart
Joseph Malone	British Army	1854	Crimean War	Balaclava
Edward Mannock	Royal Air Force	1918	First World War	Western Front
Conwyn Mansel-Jones	British Army	1900	Second Anglo-Boer War	Tugela
Jack Foreman Mantle	Royal Navy	1940	Second World War	Portland
William Mariner	British Army	1915	First World War	Cambrin
Percival Scrope Marling	British Army	1884	Mahdist War	Tamai
James Marshall	British Army	1918	First World War	Sambre–Oise Canal
William Thomas Marshall	British Army	1884	Mahdist War	El Teb
Cyril Gordon Martin	British Army	1915	First World War	Spanbroek Molen
Arthur Martin-Leake**	British Army	1902; 1914	Second Anglo-Boer War; First World War	Vlakfontein; Zonnebeke
Richard George Masters	British Army	1918	First World War	Béthune
Francis Cornwallis Maude	British Army	1857	Indian Mutiny	Lucknow
Thomas Harold Broadbent Maufe	British Army	1917	First World War	Feuchy
Francis Aylmer Maxwell	British Indian Army	1900	Second Anglo-Boer War	Korn Spruit
Arthur Mayo	Royal Navy	1857	Indian Mutiny	Dacca
Tom Fletcher Mayson	British Army	1917	First World War	Wieltje
William Fraser McDonell	Civilian	1857	Indian Mutiny	Arrah
Ian McKay	British Army	1982	Falklands War	Mount Longdon
Edward McKenna	British Army	1863	New Zealand Wars	Cameron Town
Albert Edward McKenzie	Royal Navy	1918	First World War	Zeebrugge
William McNally	British Army	1918	First World War	Piave
John McNamara	British Army	1918	First World War	Lens
Frederick McNess	British Army	1916	First World War	Ginchy
Allastair McReady-Diarmid	British Army	1917	First World War	Mœuvres
Samuel Meekosha	British Army	1915	First World War	Yser
Edward Noel Mellish	British Army	1916	First World War	Saint-Éloi
Teignmouth Melvill	British Army	1879	Anglo-Zulu War	Isandhlwana
Godfrey Meynell	British Indian Army	1935	Second Mohmand Campaign	Mohmand
John Peniston Milbanke	British Army	1900	Second Anglo-Boer War	Colesberg
Francis George Miles	British Army	1918	First World War	Bois-l'Évêque
Frederick Miller	British Army	1854	Crimean War	Inkerman
James Miller	British Army	1916	First World War	Bazentin-le-Petit
Walter Mills	British Army	1917	First World War	Givenchy
George Allan Mitchell	British Army	1944	Second World War	Damiano Ridge
Samuel Mitchell	Royal Navy	1864	New Zealand Wars	Te Papa
John Molyneux	British Army	1917	First World War	Langemarck
George Monger	British Army	1857	Indian Mutiny	Lucknow
Montague Shadworth Seymour Moore	British Army	1917	First World War	Ypres
Samuel Morley	British Army	1858	Indian Mutiny	Azumgurh
Edward John Mott	British Army	1917	First World War	Le Transloy
Thomas Mottershead	British Army	1917	First World War	Ploegsteert Wood
James Mouat	British Army	1854	Crimean War	Balaclava
Albert Mountain	British Army	1918	First World War	Hamelincourt
Andrew Moynihan	British Army	1855	Crimean War	Sebastopol
James McCudden	British Army	1917	First World War	Western Front
Harold Sandford Mugford	British Army	1917	First World War	Monchy-le-Preux
Kenneth Muir	British Army	1950	Korean War	Songju
Edgar Kinghorn Myles	British Army	1916	First World War	Sanna-i-Yat
William Napier	British Army	1858	Indian Mutiny	Azumgurh
Martin Eric Nasmith	Royal Navy	1915	First World War	Dardanelles
Philip Neame	British Army	1914	First World War	Neuve-Chapelle
Samuel Needham	British Army	1918	First World War	Kefr Kasim
Thomas Neely	British Army	1918	First World War	Flesquières
Robert Newell	British Army	1858	Indian Mutiny	Lucknow
Augustus Charles Newman	British Army	1942	Second World War	Saint-Nazaire
Harry Nicholls	British Army	1940	Second World War	River Escaut
Eric James Brindley Nicolson	Royal Air Force	1940	Second World War	Southampton
Cecil Reginald Noble	British Army	1915	First World War	Neuve-Chapelle
William Norman	British Army	1854	Crimean War	Sebastopol
John Norwood	British Army	1899	Second Anglo-Boer War	Ladysmith
James Ockendon	British Army	1917	First World War	Langemarck
William Odgers	Royal Navy	1860	New Zealand Wars	Omata
George Onions	British Army	1918	First World War	Achiet-le-Petit
John William Ormsby	British Army	1917	First World War	Favet
James Osborne	British Army	1881	First Anglo-Boer War	Wesselstroom
William Oxenham	British Army	1857	Indian Mutiny	Lucknow
Anthony Palmer	British Army	1854	Crimean War	Inkerman
Frederick William Palmer	British Army	1917	First World War	Courcelette
Robert Anthony Maurice Palmer	Royal Air Force	1944	Second World War	Cologne
Charles Parker	British Army	1900	Second Anglo-Boer War	Korn Spruit
Walter Richard Parker	Royal Marines	1915	First World War	Gallipoli
Samuel Parkes	British Army	1854	Crimean War	Balaclava
Frederick Daniel Parslow	Merchant navy	1915	First World War	Atlantic
Francis Newton Parsons	British Army	1900	Second Anglo-Boer War	Paardeberg
Hardy Falconer Parsons	British Army	1917	First World War	Épehy
George Stanley Peachment	British Army	1915	First World War	Hulloch
John Pearson	British Army	1858	Indian Mutiny	Gwalior
William Peel	Royal Navy	1854	Crimean War	Sebastopol
Henry Singleton Pennell	British Army	1897	Tirah Campaign	Dargai Heights
Henry Hugh Manvers Percy	British Army	1854	Crimean War	Inkerman
Everard Aloysius Lisle Phillipps	British Indian Army	1857	Indian Mutiny	Delhi
Robert Edwin Phillips	British Army	1917	First World War	Kut
Edmund John Phipps-Hornby	British Army	1900	Second Anglo-Boer War	Korn Spruit
Arthur Frederick Pickard	British Army	1863	New Zealand Wars	Rangiriri
Ernest Herbert Pitcher	Royal Navy	1917	First World War	Bay of Biscay
Henry William Pitcher	British Indian Army	1863	Umbeyla Campaign	Crag Picquet
James Pitts	British Army	1900	Second Anglo-Boer War	Caesar's Camp
Basil Charles Godfrey Place	Royal Navy	1943	Second World War	Kaafjord
Alfred Oliver Pollard	British Army	1917	First World War	Gavrelle
Frederick William Owen Potts	British Army	1915	First World War	Gallipoli
Arthur Poulter	British Army	1918	First World War	Erquinghem
John Prettyjohns	Royal Marines	1854	Crimean War	Inkerman
Llewellyn Price-Davies	British Army	1901	Second Anglo-Boer War	Blood River Poort
Thomas Pride	Royal Navy	1864	Shimonoseki Campaign	Shimonoseki
Dighton MacNaghton Probyn	British Indian Army	1857	Indian Mutiny	Agra
Arthur Herbert Procter	British Army	1916	First World War	Ficheux
George Prowse	Royal Navy	1918	First World War	Pronville
Charles Pye	British Army	1857	Indian Mutiny	Lucknow
Lionel Ernest Queripel	British Army	1944	Second World War	Arnhem
William Ratcliffe	British Army	1917	First World War	Messines
George Ravenhill	British Army	1899	Second Anglo-Boer War	Colenso
John Crawshaw Raynes	British Army	1915	First World War	Béthune
Claud Raymond	British Army	1945	Second World War	Talaku
William Raynor	British Army	1857	Indian Mutiny	Delhi
Anketell Moutray Read	British Army	1915	First World War	Hulloch
John Readitt	British Army	1917	First World War	Alqayat-al-Gaharbigah Bend
Thomas Reeves	Royal Navy	1854	Crimean War	Inkerman
Thomas Edward Rendle	British Army	1914	First World War	Wulverghem
Douglas Reynolds	British Army	1914	First World War	Le Cateau
Henry Reynolds	British Army	1917	First World War	Frezenberg
John Harald Rhodes	British Army	1917	First World War	Houthulst Forest
William Barnard Rhodes-Moorhouse	Royal Air Force	1915	First World War	Courtrai
Alfred Joseph Richards	British Army	1915	First World War	Gallipoli
William Thomas Rickard	Royal Navy	1855	Crimean War	Sea of Azov
Frederick Charles Riggs	British Army	1918	First World War	Épinoy
Jacob Rivers	British Army	1915	First World War	Neuve-Chapelle
John Robarts	Royal Navy	1855	Crimean War	Sea of Azov
Frank Crowther Roberts	British Army	1918	First World War	Pargny
James Reynolds Roberts	British Army	1857	Indian Mutiny	Bulandshahr
Peter Scawen Watkinson Roberts	Royal Navy	1942	Second World War	Crete
Charles Graham Robertson	British Army	1918	First World War	Polderhoek Chateau
Edward Robinson	Royal Navy	1858	Indian Mutiny	Lucknow
Eric Gascoigne Robinson	Royal Navy	1915	First World War	Dardanelles
William Leefe Robinson	British Army	1916	First World War	Cuffley
Henry Howey Robson	British Army	1914	First World War	Kemmel
Maurice Albert Windham Rogers	British Army	1944	Second World War	Anzio
Frederick George Room	British Army	1917	First World War	Frezenberg
Gerard Broadmead Roope	Royal Navy	1940	Second World War	Vestfjorden
Matthew Rosamund	British Indian Army	1857	Indian Mutiny	Benares
David Rushe	British Army	1858	Indian Mutiny	Lucknow
Charles Russell	British Army	1854	Crimean War	Inkerman
Robert Edward Ryder	British Army	1916	First World War	Thiepval
Robert Edward Dudley Ryder	Royal Navy	1942	Second World War	Saint-Nazaire
Thomas Henry Sage	British Army	1917	First World War	Ypres
Philip Salkeld	British Indian Army	1857	Indian Mutiny	Delhi
Nowell Salmon	Royal Navy	1857	Indian Mutiny	Lucknow
George Sanders	British Army	1916	First World War	Thiepval
Richard Douglas Sandford	Royal Navy	1918	First World War	Zeebrugge
Willward Alexander Sandys-Clarke	British Army	1943	Second World War	Guiriat El Atach
Arthur Frederick Saunders	British Army	1915	First World War	Loos
William Alfred Savage	Royal Navy	1942	Second World War	St. Nazaire
John William Sayer	British Army	1918	First World War	Le Verguier
Arthur Stewart King Scarf	Royal Air Force	1941	Second World War	Singora
Harry Norton Schofield	British Army	1899	Second Anglo-Boer War	Colenso
John Schofield	British Army	1918	First World War	Givenchy
Mark Scholefield	Royal Navy	1854	Crimean War	Inkerman
Andrew Scott	British Indian Army	1877	Balochistan Campaign	Quetta
Robert George Scott	Cape Colonial Forces	1879	Basuto Gun War	Morosi's Mountain
Robert Scott	British Army	1900	Second Anglo-Boer War	Caesar's Camp
Derek Anthony Seagrim	British Army	1943	Second World War	Mareth Line
Ernest Seaman	British Army	1918	First World War	Terhand
Alfred Edward Sephton	Royal Navy	1941	Second World War	Crete
Cecil Harold Sewell	British Army	1918	First World War	Frémicourt
Charles Richard Sharpe	British Army	1915	First World War	Rouges Bancs
John Francis David Shaul	British Army	1899	Second Anglo-Boer War	Magersfontein
Robert Haydon Shebbeare	British Indian Army	1857	Indian Mutiny	Delhi
Albert Edward Shepherd	British Army	1917	First World War	Villers-Plouich
John Sheppard	Royal Navy	1855	Crimean War	Sebastopol
Robert St. Vincent Sherbrooke	Royal Navy	1942	Second World War	North Cape
William Henry Short	British Army	1916	First World War	Munster Alley
William Philip Sidney	British Army	1944	Second World War	Anzio
Walter Simpson, see Arthur Evans				
John Joseph Sims	British Army	1855	Crimean War	Sebastopol
Alfred Smith	British Army	1885	Mahdist War	Abu Klea
Alfred Victor Smith	British Army	1915	First World War	Gallipoli
Clement Leslie Smith	British Army	1904	Fourth Somaliland Expedition	Jidballi
Edward Smith	British Army	1918	First World War	Serre
Henry Smith	British Army	1857	Indian Mutiny	Delhi
Issy Smith	British Army	1915	First World War	St. Julien
John Smith	British Indian Army	1857	Indian Mutiny	Lucknow
James Smith	British Army	1897	First Mohmand Campaign	Mamund Valley
James Alexander Smith	British Army	1914	First World War	Rouges Bancs
John Smith	British Indian Army	1857	Indian Mutiny	Delhi
John George Smyth	British Indian Army	1915	First World War	Richebourg L'Aouve
Nevill Maskelyne Smyth	British Army	1898	Mahdist War	Khartoum
Charles Edward Spackman	British Army	1917	First World War	Marcoing
Bill Speakman	British Army	1951	Korean War	Point 217
William Stanlake	British Army	1854	Crimean War	Inkerman
Richard Been Stannard	Royal Navy	1940	Second World War	Namsos
Gordon Charles Steele	Royal Navy	1919	North Russia Relief Force	Kronstadt
Thomas Steele	British Army	1917	First World War	Sanna-i-Yat
Charles Edwin Stone	British Army	1918	First World War	Caponne Farm
Walter Napleton Stone	British Army	1917	First World War	Cambrai
George Stringer	British Army	1916	First World War	Es Sinn
George Strong	British Army	1855	Crimean War	Sebastopol
Ronald Niel Stuart	Royal Navy	1917	First World War	Atlantic
Frank Edward Stubbs	British Army	1915	First World War	Gallipoli
William Sutton	British Army	1857	Indian Mutiny	Delhi
Ernest Sykes	British Army	1917	First World War	Arras
William Henry Thomas Sylvester	British Army	1855	Crimean War	Sebastopol
George Symons	British Army	1855	Crimean War	Inkerman
Henry Tandey	British Army	1918	First World War	Marcoing
John Taylor	Royal Navy	1855	Crimean War	Sebastopol
Christopher Charles Teesdale	British Army	1855	Crimean War	Kars
Edward Talbot Thackeray	British Indian Army	1857	Indian Mutiny	Delhi
John Thomas	British Army	1917	First World War	Fontaine
James Thompson	British Army	1857	Indian Mutiny	Lucknow
James Towers	British Army	1918	First World War	Mericourt
Ernest Beachcroft Beckwith Towse	British Army	1899	Second Anglo-Boer War	Magersfontein
Alfred Maurice Toye	British Army	1918	First World War	Eterpigny Ridge
Charles William Train	British Army	1917	First World War	Air Karim
William Bernard Traynor		1901	Second Anglo-Boer War	Bothwell Camp
Joseph Trewavas	Royal Navy	1855	Crimean War	Sea of Azov
Alexander Buller Turner	British Army	1915	First World War	Vermelles
Hanson Victor Turner	British Army	1944	Second World War	Ningthoukhong
Samuel Turner	British Army	1857	Indian Mutiny	Delhi
Victor Buller Turner	British Army	1942	Second World War	El Aqqaqir
Thomas George Turrall	British Army	1916	First World War	La Boiselle
Edward Unwin	Royal Navy	1915	First World War	Gallipoli
James Upton	British Army	1915	First World War	Rouges Bancs
John Franks Vallentin	British Army	1914	First World War	Zillebeke
Bernard William Vann	British Army	1918	First World War	Bellenglise
Theodore William Henry Veale	British Army	1916	First World War	High Wood
John Vereker	British Army	1918	First World War	Canal du Nord
Arthur Vickers	British Army	1915	First World War	Hulloch
Charles Geoffrey Vickers	British Army	1915	First World War	Hohenzollern Redoubt
Samuel Vickery	British Army	1897	Tirah Campaign	Dargai Heights
Richard Wadeson	British Army	1857	Indian Mutiny	Delhi
Richard Wakeford	British Army	1944	Second World War	Cassino
Adam Herbert Wakenshaw	British Army	1942	Second World War	Mersa Matruh
Garth Neville Walford	British Army	1915	First World War	Gallipoli
George Waller	British Army	1857	Indian Mutiny	Delhi
Horace Waller	British Army	1917	First World War	Héninel
George Walters	British Army	1854	Crimean War	Inkerman
Charles Ward	British Army	1900	Second Anglo-Boer War	Lindley
Henry Ward	British Army	1857	Indian Mutiny	Lucknow
John Watson	British Indian Army	1857	Indian Mutiny	Lucknow
William Allison White	British Army	1918	First World War	Gouzeaucourt
Evelyn Wood	British Army	1858	Indian Mutiny	Sindhora
Thomas Woodcock	British Army	1918	First World War	Broenbeek
Thomas Young	Royal Navy	1857	Indian Mutiny	Lucknow
Ferdinand Maurice Felix West	Royal Air Force	1918	First World War	Somme

== General references ==
- Wright, Christopher J.; Anderson, Glenda M., eds. (2013). The Victoria Cross and the George Cross: The Complete History (3 volumes). Methuen. ISBN 978-0-413-77752-2.
