= List of artillery recipients of the Victoria Cross =

The Victoria Cross

The Victoria Cross (VC) is a military decoration that may be bestowed upon members of the British or Commonwealth armed forces for acts of valour or gallantry performed in the face of the enemy. Within the British honours system and those of many Commonwealth nations it is the highest award a soldier can receive for actions in combat. It was established in 1856 and since then has been awarded 1,356 times; three service personnel have received the award twice.

The VC was introduced on 29 January 1856 by Queen Victoria to reward acts of valour during the Crimean War. The traditional explanation of the source of the gunmetal from which the medals are struck is that it derives from Russian cannon captured at the siege of Sevastopol. Recent research has thrown doubt on this story, suggesting a variety of origins. The original Royal Warrant did not contain a specific clause regarding posthumous awards, although official policy was to not award the VC posthumously. Between 1897 and 1901, several notices were issued in the London Gazette regarding soldiers who would have been awarded the VC had they survived. In a partial reversal of policy in 1902, six of the soldiers mentioned were granted the VC, but not "officially" awarded the medal. In 1907, the posthumous policy was completely reversed and medals were sent to the next of kin of the six officers and men. The Victoria Cross warrant was not officially amended to explicitly allow posthumous awards until 1920 but one quarter of all awards for the First World War were posthumous.

Due to its rarity, the VC is highly prized and the medal has fetched over £400,000 at auction. A number of public and private collections are devoted to the Victoria Cross. The private collection of Lord Ashcroft, amassed since 1986, contains over one-tenth of all VCs awarded. Following a 2008 donation to the Imperial War Museum, the Ashcroft collection went on public display alongside the museum's Victoria and George Cross collection in November 2010. Since 1990, three Commonwealth countries that retain the Queen as head of state have instituted their own versions of the VC. As a result, the original Victoria Cross is sometimes referred to as the "Commonwealth Victoria Cross" or the "Imperial Victoria Cross", to distinguish it from the newer awards.

The British Royal Regiment of Artillery was formed at Woolwich in 1716. Being present at almost every battle the British Army has been involved in, several of its batteries are now named after Victoria Cross actions. J (Sidi Rezegh) Battery Royal Horse Artillery is one of these units, and is named after the Battle of Sidi Rezegh during which Second Lieutenant George Gunn performed the deeds for which he was later awarded a posthumous Victoria Cross.

Since its introduction there have been sixty-five awards of the Victoria Cross to artillerymen, awarded for bravery in eight different wars. The first award was during the Crimean War and the last for the Second World War. The recipients include an Indian serving in the Indian Artillery, a member of the Royal Australian Artillery, and sixteen members of the then Bengal or Bombay Armies. The remainder have been from the three branches of the British Royal Artillery: the Royal Horse Artillery, the Royal Field Artillery, and the Royal Garrison Artillery. Two artillerymen received the award for actions performed while they were serving with other formations, one in the First World War with the Royal Flying Corps, and one in the Second World War with the British Commandos.

== Artillery recipients ==
Name	Branch	Date	Conflict	Location
Ernest Alexander	Royal Field Artillery	24 August 1914	First World War	Elouges
Thomas Arthur	Royal Field Artillery	7 June 1855	Crimean War	Sevastopol
Frederick Bradley	Royal Field Artillery	26 September 1901	Second Anglo-Boer War	Itala
Edward Bradbury	Royal Horse Artillery	1 September 1914	First World War	Néry
Joseph Brennan	Royal Field Artillery	3 April 1858	Indian Mutiny	Jhansi
Daniel Cambridge	Royal Field Artillery	8 September 1855	Crimean War	Sevastopol
John Campbell	Royal Horse Artillery	21–23 November 1941	Second World War	Sidi Rezegh
James Collis	Royal Horse Artillery	28 July 1880	Second Anglo-Afghan War	Maiwand
William Connolly	Bengal Horse Artillery	7 July 1857	Indian Mutiny	Jhelum
Roden Cutler	Royal Australian Artillery	19 June 1941	Second World War	Merdjayoun
Gronow Davis	Royal Field Artillery	8 September 1855	Crimean War	Sevastopol
Bernard Diamond	Bengal Horse Artillery	28 September 1857	Indian Mutiny	Bolandshahr
Collingwood Dickson	Royal Field Artillery	17 October 1854	Crimean War	Sevastopol
Matthew Dixon	Royal Field Artillery	17 April 1855	Crimean War	Sevastopol
George Dorrell	Royal Horse Artillery	1 September 1914	First World War	Néry
Eric Dougall	Royal Field Artillery	10 April 1918	First World War	Messines
Job Drain	Royal Field Artillery	26 August 1914	First World War	Le Cateau
Richard Fitzgerald	Bengal Horse Artillery	28 September 1857	Indian Mutiny	Bolandshahr
Horace Glasock	Royal Horse Artillery	31 March 1900	Second Anglo-Boer War	Sanna's Post
Robert Gorle	Royal Field Artillery	1 October 1918	First World War	Ledeghem
William Gosling	Royal Field Artillery	5 April 1917	First World War	Arras
Cyril Gourley	Royal Field Artillery	30 November 1917	First World War	Cambrai
George Gunn	Royal Horse Artillery	21 November 1941	Second World War	Sidi Rezegh
Hastings Harrington	Bengal Artillery	14–22 November 1857	Indian Mutiny	Lucknow
Andrew Henry	Royal Field Artillery	5 November 1854	Crimean War	Inkerman
Ernest Horlock	Royal Field Artillery	15 September 1914	First World War	Vendresse
James Hills-Johnes	Bengal Horse Artillery	9 July 1857	Indian Mutiny	Delhi
Alfred Ind	Royal Horse Artillery	20 December 1901	Second Anglo-Boer War	Tafelkop
Edward Jennings	Bengal Artillery	14–22 November 1857	Indian Mutiny	Lucknow
Richard Keatinge	Bombay Artillery	17 March 1858	Indian Mutiny	Chanderi fort
Thomas Laughnan	Bengal Artillery	14–22 November 1857	Indian Mutiny	Lucknow
Isaac Lodge	Royal Horse Artillery	31 March 1900	Second Anglo-Boer War	Sanna's Post
Frederick Luke	Royal Field Artillery	26 August 1914	First World War	Le Cateau
William Manley	Royal Field Artillery	29 April 1864	New Zealand Wars	Tauranga
Francis Maude	Royal Field Artillery	25 September 1857	Indian Mutiny	Lucknow
Thomas Maufe	Royal Garrison Artillery	4 June 1917	First World War	Feuchy
Hugh McInnes	Bengal Artillery	14–22 November 1857	Indian Mutiny	Lucknow
Frederick Miller	Royal Field Artillery	5 November 1854	Crimean War	Inkerman
Patrick Mullane	Royal Horse Artillery	27 July 1880	Second Anglo-Afghan War	Maiwand
David Nelson	Royal Horse Artillery	1 September 1914	First World War	Néry
George Nurse	Royal Field Artillery	15 December 1899	Second Anglo-Boer War	Colenso
William Olpherts	Bengal Artillery	25 September 1857	Indian Mutiny	Lucknow
James Park	Bengal Artillery	14–22 November 1857	Indian Mutiny	Lucknow
Charles Parker	Royal Horse Artillery	31 March 1900	Second Anglo-Boer War	Sanna's Post
Edmund Phipps-Hornby	Royal Horse Artillery	31 March 1900	Second Anglo-Boer War	Sanna's Post
Arthur Pickard	Royal Field Artillery	20 November 1863	New Zealand Wars	Rangiriri
Patrick Porteous	Royal Artillery	2 November 1942	Second World War	Dieppe (Note: Attached to No.4 Commando.)
John Raynes	Royal Field Artillery	11 October 1915	First World War	Béthune
Hamilton Reed	Royal Field Artillery	15 December 1899	Second Anglo-Boer War	Colenso
Lionel Rees	Royal Garrison Artillery	1 July 1916	First World War	Double Crassieurs (Note: Attached to No. 32 Squadron, Royal Flying Corps.)
George Renny	Bengal Horse Artillery	16 September 1857	Indian Mutiny	Delhi
Douglas Reynolds	Royal Field Artillery	26 August 1914	First World War	Le Cateau
Frederick Roberts	Bengal Horse Artillery	2 January 1858	Indian Mutiny	Khudaganj
Patrick Roddy	Bengal Artillery	27 September 1858	Indian Mutiny	Kuthirga
Harry Schofield	Royal Field Artillery	15 December 1899	Second Anglo-Boer War	Colenso
Umrao Singh	Indian Artillery	15–16 December 1944	Second World War	Kaladan River
Alfred Smith	Royal Field Artillery	17 January 1885	Mahdist War	Abu Klea
Charles Stone	Royal Field Artillery	21 March 1918	First World War	Caponne Farm
George Symons	Royal Field Artillery	6 June 1855	Crimean War	Inkerman
Christopher Teesdale	Royal Field Artillery	29 September 1855	Crimean War	Kars
William Temple	Royal Field Artillery	20 November 1863	New Zealand Wars	Waikato
Jacob Thomas	Bengal Artillery	27 September 1857	Indian Mutiny	Lucknow
Henry Tombs	Bengal Horse Artillery	9 July 1857	Indian Mutiny	Delhi
Garth Walford	Royal Field Artillery	26 April 1915	First World War	Gallipoli
Samuel Wallace	Royal Field Artillery	20 November 1917	First World War	Gonnelieu
