= John Raines (disambiguation) =

John Raines (1840–1909) was an American lawyer and politician.

John Raines or Raynes may also refer to:

- John Crawshaw Raynes (1887–1929), English soldier and Victoria Cross recipient
- John C. Raines (1933–2017), American clergyman and activist; one of the members of the Citizens' Commission to Investigate the FBI
