= Francis Maxwell =

Francis Maxwell may refer to:

- Francis Aylmer Maxwell (1871–1917), British Army officer
- Francis William Maxwell (1863–1941), British architect
