= Francis Wheatley (VC) =

Recipient of the Victoria Cross

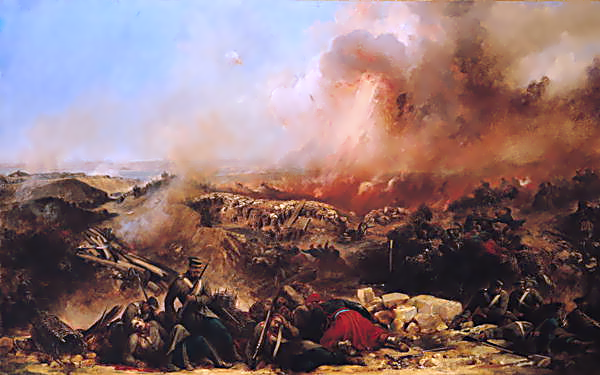
- Depiction of the Siege of Sebastopol
- Born: 1821; Ruddington, Nottinghamshire
- Died: 21 May 1865 (aged 38–39); Westminster Hospital, London
- Burial place: Brompton Cemetery
- Military career
- Allegiance: United Kingdom
- Branch: British Army
- Rank: Rifleman
- Units: Rifle Brigade
- Conflicts: Xhosa Wars; Crimean War
- Awards: Victoria Cross; Distinguished Conduct Medal; Légion d'honneur (France)

Francis Wheatley VC, DCM (1821 – 21 May 1865) was a British Army soldier and a Crimean War recipient of the Victoria Cross, the highest award for gallantry in the face of the enemy that can be awarded to British and Commonwealth forces.

He was born in Ruddington, Nottinghamshire, England. His father was a frame work knitter, a trade which Francis took up before joining the army. He was enlisted at Daventry on 5 November 1839 (for a bounty of £3.17s.6d) into the 1st Battalion Rifle Brigade (Prince Consort's Own).

== Victoria Cross ==
He was awarded his Victoria Cross (VC) for duty in the Crimean War on 12 October 1854. The day before his VC action, another act of gallantry earned him the Distinguished Conduct Medal. The citation for his VC reads: On 12 October 1854 Wheatley and some other Riflemen were occupying a section of the trenches before Sevastopol when a live Russian shell fell amongst the men. Without hesitation Wheatley seized hold of the shell and endeavoured to knock the fuse out with the butt of his rifle. He was unsuccessful at the first attempt and so, with great presence of mind and deliberation he managed somehow to heave it over the parapet of the trench. It had scarcely fallen outside when it exploded. Had it not been for his coolness, presence of mind and supreme courage and discipline, the shell would have inevitably exploded amongst the party causing serious casualties, but instead not a man was hurt.

His VC was presented by Queen Victoria in person at the first investiture at Hyde Park, London on 26 June 1857.

== Death ==
He died on 21 May 1865 at Westminster Hospital, London from acute myelitis (inflammation of the spinal cord) and asphyxia. He was buried in a common grave in Brompton Cemetery, on which a memorial has now been placed. His medals are on view at the Royal Green Jackets (Rifles) Museum and his name is on the memorial in Winchester Cathedral.

== The medal ==
His Victoria Cross and other medals are displayed at the Royal Green Jackets (Rifles) Museum, Winchester, England.

His other medals are:

- South Africa Medal
- Crimea War medal with 3 clasps
- Army Long Service and Good Conduct Medal
- Turkish War Medal
- French Legion of Honour

== See also ==
- List of English Victoria Cross recipients
