= Arnold Loosemore =

Recipient of the Victoria Cross

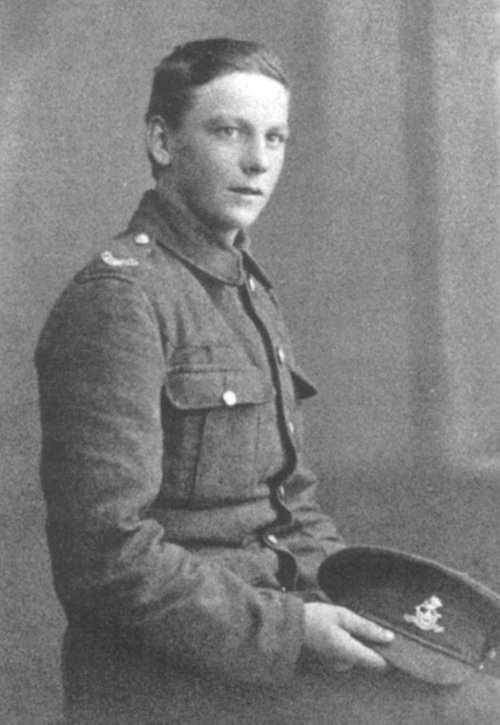
- Born: 7 June 1896; Sheffield, West Riding of Yorkshire
- Died: 10 April 1924 (aged 27); Sheffield
- Burial place: All Saints Churchyard, Ecclesall, Sheffield
- Military career
- Allegiance: United Kingdom
- Branch: British Army
- Service years: 1915 - 1918
- Rank: Sergeant
- Units: York and Lancaster Regiment; The Duke of Wellington's Regiment
- Conflicts: World War I
- Awards: Victoria Cross; Distinguished Conduct Medal

Arnold Loosemore VC DCM (7 June 1896 – 10 April 1924) was an English recipient of the Victoria Cross, the highest and most prestigious award for gallantry in the face of the enemy that can be awarded to British and Commonwealth forces.

== Details ==
One of seven sons of a Sheffield gardener, Arnold Loosemore enlisted in the Army on 2 January 1915 aged 18 years and 7 months. Posted to the York and Lancaster Regiment, in July 1915 he left Liverpool for the ill-fated Gallipoli campaign arriving in Suvla Bay in August 1915. Surviving this campaign and returning home, he was then trained to use the Lewis machine gun. After this training, in July 1916 he was sent to the Somme in France to join the 8th Battalion of the Duke of Wellington's (West Riding) Regiment. In 1917 then aged 21 and a private, he was awarded the Victoria Cross and a year later the Distinguished Conduct Medal.

=== Victoria Cross ===
On 11 August 1917 south of Langemarck, Belgium, during the attack on a strongly held enemy position and his platoon having been held up by heavy machine-gun fire, Private Loosemore crawled through partially cut wire, dragging his Lewis machine-gun with him and single-handedly dealt with a strong party of the enemy, killing about 20 of them. Immediately afterwards his Lewis gun was destroyed and three of the enemy rushed at him, but he shot them with his revolver. Later he shot several enemy snipers, and on returning to the original post he brought back a wounded comrade under heavy fire.

=== Distinguished Conduct Medal ===
On 19 June 1918 at Zillebeke, Belgium, when out with a fighting patrol, his officer was wounded and the platoon scattered by hostile bombs, so he rallied the men and brought them back in order with all the wounded to friendly lines. On a subsequent occasion he handled his platoon with skill and a disregard of his own danger under heavy machine gun fire. It was owing to his determination and powers of leadership that the platoon eventually captured the enemy post which they were attacking.

== Later life ==
In August 1917 he was promoted to corporal by his commanding officer for gallantry in the field and in May 1918 was promoted to the rank of sergeant. On 13 October 1918 he was badly wounded by machine gun fire near Villiers-en-Cauchies in France and eventually had his left leg amputated above the knee. His health undermined by war wounds and unable to work, he died on 10 April 1924 from tuberculosis leaving a wife and small son. His wife Amy was refused a War Widows pension from the Government because he died after the war and she knew he was ill when she married him. Almost destitute; his wife had to have him buried in an existing grave with three others in order to save money.

== Legacy ==
His Victoria Cross and Distinguished Conduct Medals were sold in 1969 to an Australian collector. In July 2023 the medals were sold again for £220,000. In the early 1980s a street in the S12 area of Sheffield was named Loosemore Drive by the Lord Mayor. Soon afterwards a memorial plaque to mark this event was removed due to repeated vandalism. This missing plaque was replaced in December 2014 by a new bronze plaque.
