= Edmund Phipps-Hornby =

British Army general and recipient of the Victoria Cross

Brigadier-General Edmund Phipps-Hornby VC CB CMG DL
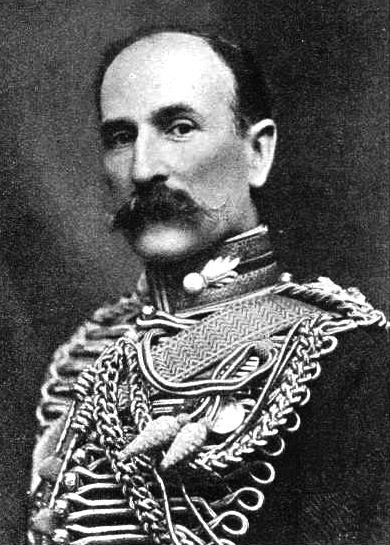
- Major Phipps-Hornby, 1900
- Born: 31 December 1857; Lordington House, Racton, Sussex
- Died: 13 December 1947 (aged 89); Sonning, Berkshire
- Burial place: St Andrew's churchyard, Sonning
- Relatives: Sir Geoffrey Hornby (father); Geoffrey H. Phipps-Hornby, Sr. (son); Robert Hornby (brother)
- Military career
- Allegiance: United Kingdom
- Branch: British Army
- Service years: 1878–1918
- Rank: Brigadier-General
- Units: Royal Artillery
- Conflicts: Bechuanaland Expedition 1884–5; Second Boer War; First World War
- Awards: Victoria Cross; Companion of the Order of the Bath; Companion of the Order of St Michael and St George; Mentioned in Despatches

Brigadier-General Edmund John Phipps-Hornby, VC, CB, CMG, DL (31 December 1857 – 13 December 1947) was a British Army officer and a recipient of the Victoria Cross, the highest award for gallantry in the face of the enemy that can be awarded to British and Commonwealth forces.

== Background ==
Phipps-Hornby was born in Lordington House, Hampshire on 31 December 1857, the son of the Admiral of the Fleet Sir Geoffrey Phipps Hornby. He was the brother of Captain Geoffrey Stanley Phipps-Hornby and Admiral Robert Phipps Hornby.

He was promoted to captain in February 1886.

== Victoria Cross details ==
Phipps-Hornby was 42 years old, and a major commanding Q Battery, Royal Horse Artillery, British Army, during the Second Boer War when the following deed took place for which he was awarded the VC:

On 31 March 1900 at Sanna's Post (aka Korn Spruit), South Africa, 'Q' and 'U' batteries of the Royal Horse Artillery were ambushed with the loss of most of the baggage column and five guns of the leading battery. When the alarm was given 'Q' Battery, commanded by Major Phipps Hornby, went into action 1150 yards from the spruit, until the order to retire was received, when the major commanded that the guns and their limbers be run back by hand to a safe place — a most exhausting operation over a considerable distance, but at last all but one of the guns and one limber had been moved to safety and the battery reformed. The citation reads:

On the occasion of the action at Korn Spruit on the 31st March, 1900, a British force, including two batteries of the Royal Horse Artillery, was retiring from Thabanchu towards Bloemfontein. The enemy had formed an ambush at Korn Spruit, and before their presence was discovered by the main body had captured the greater portion of the baggage column and five out of the six guns of the leading battery. When the alarm was given Q Battery, Royal Horse Artillery, was within 300 yards of the Spruit. Major Phipps-Hornby, who commanded it, at once wheeled about and moved off at a gallop under a very heavy fire. One gun upset when a wheel horse was shot, and had to be abandoned, together with a waggon, the horses of which were killed. The remainder of the battery reached a position close to some unfinished railway buildings and came into action 1,150 yards from the Spruit, remaining in action until ordered to retire. When the order to retire was received Major Phipps-Hornby ordered the guns and their limbers to be run back by hand to where the teams of uninjured horses stood behind the unfinished buildings. The few remaining gunners, assisted by a number of Officers and men of a party of Mounted Infantry, and directed by Major Phipps-Hornby and Captain Humphreys, the only remaining Officers of the battery, succeeded in running back four of the guns under shelter. One or two of the limbers were similarly withdrawn by hand, but the work was most severe and the distance considerable. In consequence all concerned were so exhausted that they were unable to drag in the remaining limbers or the fifth gun. It now became necessary to risk the horses, and volunteers were called for from among the drivers, who readily responded. Several horses were killed and men wounded, but at length only one gun and one limber were left exposed. Four separate attempts were made to rescue these, but when no more hordes were available the attempt had to be given up and the gun and limber were abandoned. Meanwhile the other guns had been sent on, one at a time, and after passing within 700 or 800 yards of the enemy, in rounding the head of a donga and crossing two spruits they eventually reached a place of safety, where the battery was re-formed. After full consideration of the circumstances of the case the Field-Marshal Commanding-in-chief in South Africa formed the opinion that the conduct of all ranks of Q Battery, Royal Horse Artillery, was conspicuously gallant and daring, but that all were equally brave and devoted in their behaviour. He therefore decided to treat the case of the battery as one of collective gallantry under Rule 13 of the Victoria Cross Warrant, and directed that one Officer should be selected for the decoration of the Victoria Cross by the Officers, one non-commissioned officer by the non-commissioned officers, and two gunners or drivers by the gunners and drivers. A difficulty arose with regard to the Officer because there were only two unwounded Officers—Major Phipps-Hornby and Captain Humphreys—-available for the work of saving the guns, and both of these had been conspicuous by their gallantry and by the fearless manner in which they exposed themselves, and each of them nominated the other for the decoration. It was ultimately decided in favour of Major Phipps-Hornby as having been the senior concerned.

The following men were also awarded the Victoria Cross in the same action: Lieutenant Francis Maxwell, Sergeant Charles Parker, Gunner Isaac Lodge and Driver Horace Glasock.

== Further information ==
Following his return to the United Kingdom, Phipps Hornby served as aide-de-camp to Lord Roberts when he was commander-in-chief (C-in-C) from 1901 to 1903. He was promoted to lieutenant colonel in July 1903 and substantive colonel in July 1908. In September 1909, after having been on the half-pay list, he was promoted to the temporary rank of brigadier general and became brigadier general, Royal Artillery (BGRA) of the 4th Division.

He later served in the First World War although he was placed on half-pay in September 1915. He achieved the rank of brigadier general granted upon his retirement in 1918, after 40 years of service. His grave and memorial are in St Andrew's churchyard at Sonning in Berkshire.

== Family ==
Phipps-Hornby married, on 31 January 1895, Anna Jay, daughter of Mr. Jay, of Blendon Hall, Bexley, Kent. They had two daughters:

- Evelyn Irene Sophie Phipps-Hornby (1895–1993), married Brigadier Hubert Francis Lucas (1897-1990), of the Lucas baronets, of Ashtead park
- Betty Angela Phipps-Hornby (1902–1982), married Charles Lansdell Tapply

== The medal ==
Brigadier General Phipps Hornby's Victoria Cross and other medals are displayed at the Royal Artillery Museum, Woolwich, England.
