= Charles Edwin Stone =

Recipient of the Victoria Cross

Charles Edwin Stone VC MM
- Born: 4 February 1889; Ripley, Derbyshire
- Died: 29 August 1952 (aged 63); Derby, Derbyshire
- Burial place: Belper Cemetery
- Military career
- Allegiance: United Kingdom
- Branch: British Army
- Service years: 1914–1919
- Rank: Bombardier
- Units: Royal Field Artillery
- Conflicts: World War I
- Awards: Victoria Cross; Military Medal

Charles Edwin Stone VC MM (4 February 1889 – 29 August 1952) was an English recipient of the Victoria Cross, the highest and most prestigious award for gallantry in the face of the enemy that can be awarded to British and Commonwealth forces.

Stone was born in the town of Ripley in Derbyshire. When he was 29 years old, and a gunner in 'C' Battery 83rd Brigade, Royal Field Artillery, British Army during the First World War, the following deed took place for which he was awarded the VC.

On 21 March 1918 at Caponne Farm, France, after working at his gun for six hours under heavy gas and shell fire, Gunner Stone was sent back to the rear with an order. He delivered it and then, under a very heavy barrage, returned with a rifle to assist in holding up the enemy on a sunken road. First lying in the open under very heavy machine-gun fire and then on the right flank of the two rear guns he held the enemy at bay. Later he was one of the party which captured a machine-gun and four prisoners.

He later achieved the rank of Bombardier. His brother Ernest was killed in 1917. Stone is buried in Belper in Derbyshire

His Victoria Cross is displayed at the Royal Artillery Museum, Woolwich, England.
