= George Symons (VC) =

Recipient of the Victoria Cross

- Born: 18 March 1826; South Hill, Cornwall, England
- Died: 18 November 1871 (aged 45); Bridlington, East Riding of Yorkshire, England
- Burial place: Bridlington Priory Churchyard, East Riding of Yorkshire, England
- Military career
- Allegiance: United Kingdom
- Branch: British Army
- Rank: Captain
- Units: Royal Artillery; Military Train
- Conflicts: Crimean War
- Awards: Victoria Cross; Distinguished Conduct Medal; Légion d'honneur (France); Medal of Military Valour (Sardinia)

Captain George Symons VC DCM (18 March 1826 – 18 November 1871) was a British Army officer and an English recipient of the Victoria Cross (VC), the highest and most prestigious award for gallantry in the face of the enemy that can be awarded to British and Commonwealth forces.

== Details ==
Symons was 29 years old, and a sergeant in the Royal Regiment of Artillery, British Army during the Crimean War when the following deed On 6 June 1855 took place at Inkerman, Crimea for which he was awarded the VC.

War Office, November 18, 1857

THE Queen has been graciously pleased to signify her intention to confer the Decoration of the Victoria Cross on the undermentioned Officers and Non-Commissioned Officer of Her Majesty's Army, who have been recommended to Her Majesty for that Decoration,—in accordance with the rules laid down in Her Majesty's Warrant of the 29th January, 1856,—on account of Acts of Bravery performed by them before the enemy during the late War, as recorded against their several names, viz.:

[...]

Military Train, 5th Battalion (late Serjeant, Royal Artillery) Lieutenant George Symons Date of Act of Bravery, 18th October, 1854

For conspicuous gallantry on the 18th October, 1854, in having volunteered to unmask the embrasures of a five-gun battery in the advanced Right Attack, and when so employed, under a terrific fire, which the enemy commenced immediately on the opening of the first embrasure, and increased on the unmasking of each additional one; in having overcome the great difficulty of uncovering the last, by boldly mounting the parapet, and throwing down the sand-bags, when a shell from the enemy burst, and wounded him severely.

== Later career ==
Symons was later commissioned into the Military Train, transferred back to the Royal Artillery in 1862 and reached the rank of captain. On 15 January 1862 he was appointed Adjutant of the 1st Administrative Brigade of Yorkshire (East Riding) Artillery Volunteers.

== Further information ==
His medals are held by the Royal Logistic Corps Officers Mess.
