= Francis Aylmer Maxwell =

British Indian Army general and recipient of the Victoria Cross

Brigadier-General Francis Aylmer Maxwell VC CSI DSO*
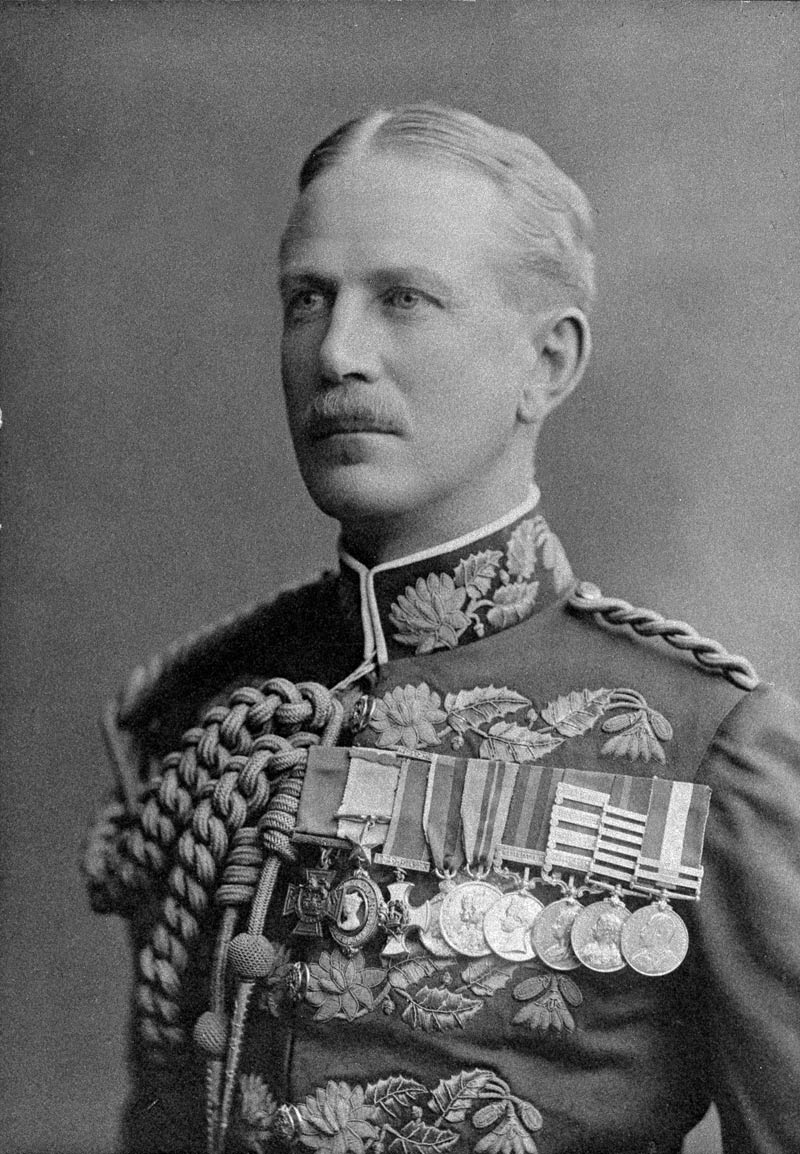
- Born: 7 September 1871; Guildford, England
- Died: 21 September 1917 (aged 46); Menin Road Ridge, Passchendaele salient, Belgium
- Burial place: Ypres Reservoir Cemetery
- Military career
- Allegiance: United Kingdom
- Branch: British Indian Army
- Service years: 1893–1917 †
- Rank: Brigadier-General
- Nickname: Frank
- Units: Indian Staff Corps
- Commands: 27th Infantry Brigade; 12th Battalion Middlesex Regiment
- Conflicts: North-West Frontier; Chitral Expedition; Tirah Campaign; Second Boer War; First World War
- Awards: Victoria Cross; Companion of the Order of the Star of India; Distinguished Service Order & Bar; Mentioned in Despatches

Brigadier-General Francis Aylmer Maxwell, VC, CSI, DSO & Bar (7 September 1871 – 21 September 1917) was a British Army officer in the Second Boer War and First World War. He was also a recipient of the Victoria Cross (VC), the highest award for gallantry in the face of the enemy that can be awarded to British and Commonwealth forces.

== Early life and military career ==
He was born on 7 September 1871 at "Westhill" in the Grange, Guildford in Surrey, the son of Surgeon Major Thomas Maxwell.

Maxwell was commissioned a second lieutenant in the Sussex Regiment on 7 November 1891 and promoted to lieutenant on 24 November 1893. He transferred to the Indian Staff Corps, Indian Army, and took part in the Chitral Expedition in 1895 with the Queen's Own Corps of Guides. In the following years he served on the North-West Frontier of India, and took part in the Tirah Campaign 1897-98 under Sir William Lockhart, to whom he was Aide-de-camp. He was appointed a Companion of the Distinguished Service Order (DSO) for his services.

== Second Boer War ==
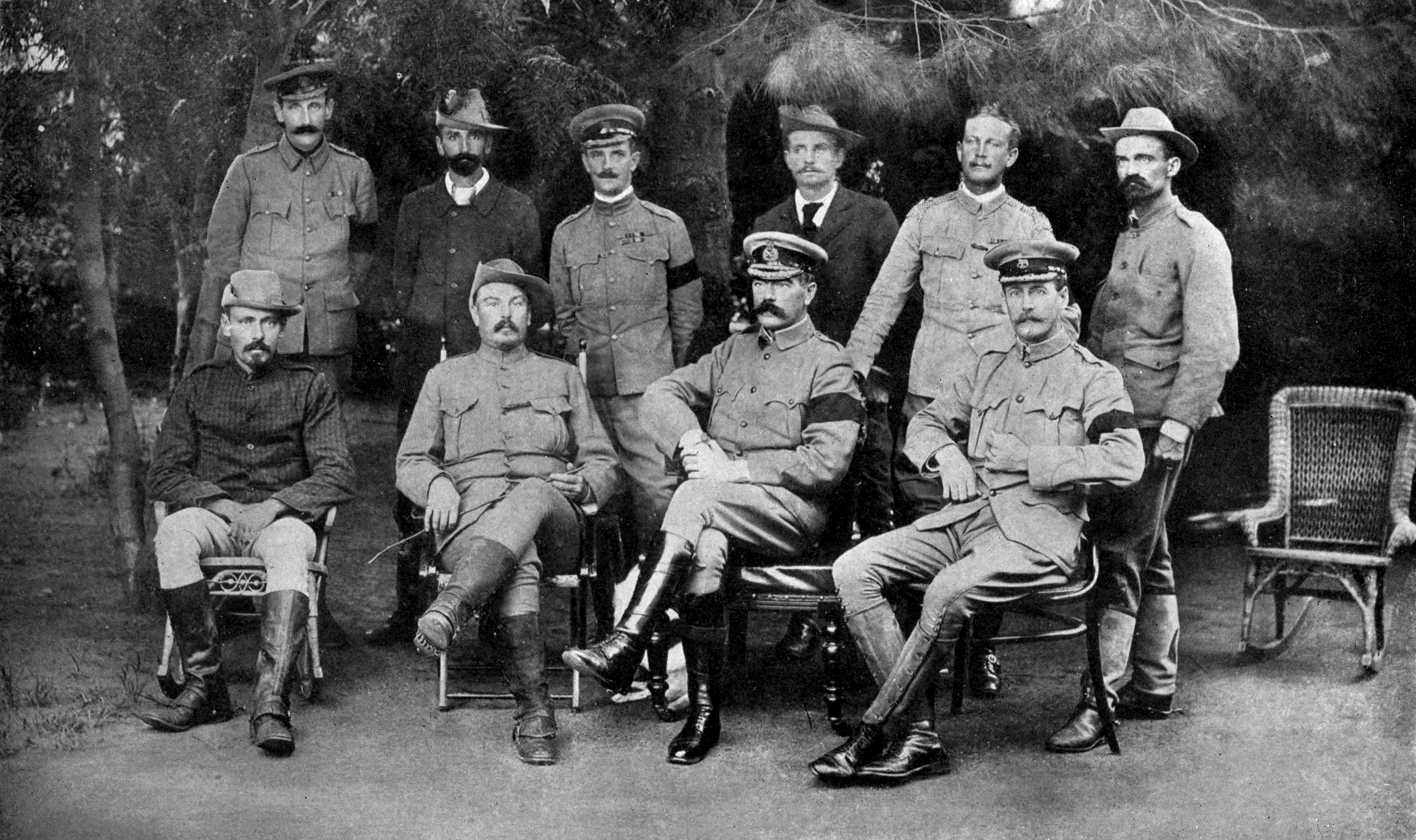
Lord Kitchener at the Peace Conference that ended the Second Boer War. Major Maxwell is stood second on the right.

Maxwell was attached to Roberts's Light Horse during the Second Boer War 1899-1900. By early March 1900 the British had captured the two capital cities of the Boer republics, and the war entered a new phase with a Boer guerrilla campaign to hit the British supply and communication lines. The first engagement of this new form of warfare was at Sanna's Post on 31 March where 1,500 Boers under the command of Christiaan De Wet attacked Bloemfontein's waterworks about 37 kilometres (23 mi) east of the city, and ambushed a heavily escorted convoy, which caused 155 British casualties and the capture of seven guns, 117 wagons, and 428 British troops.

=== Victoria Cross ===
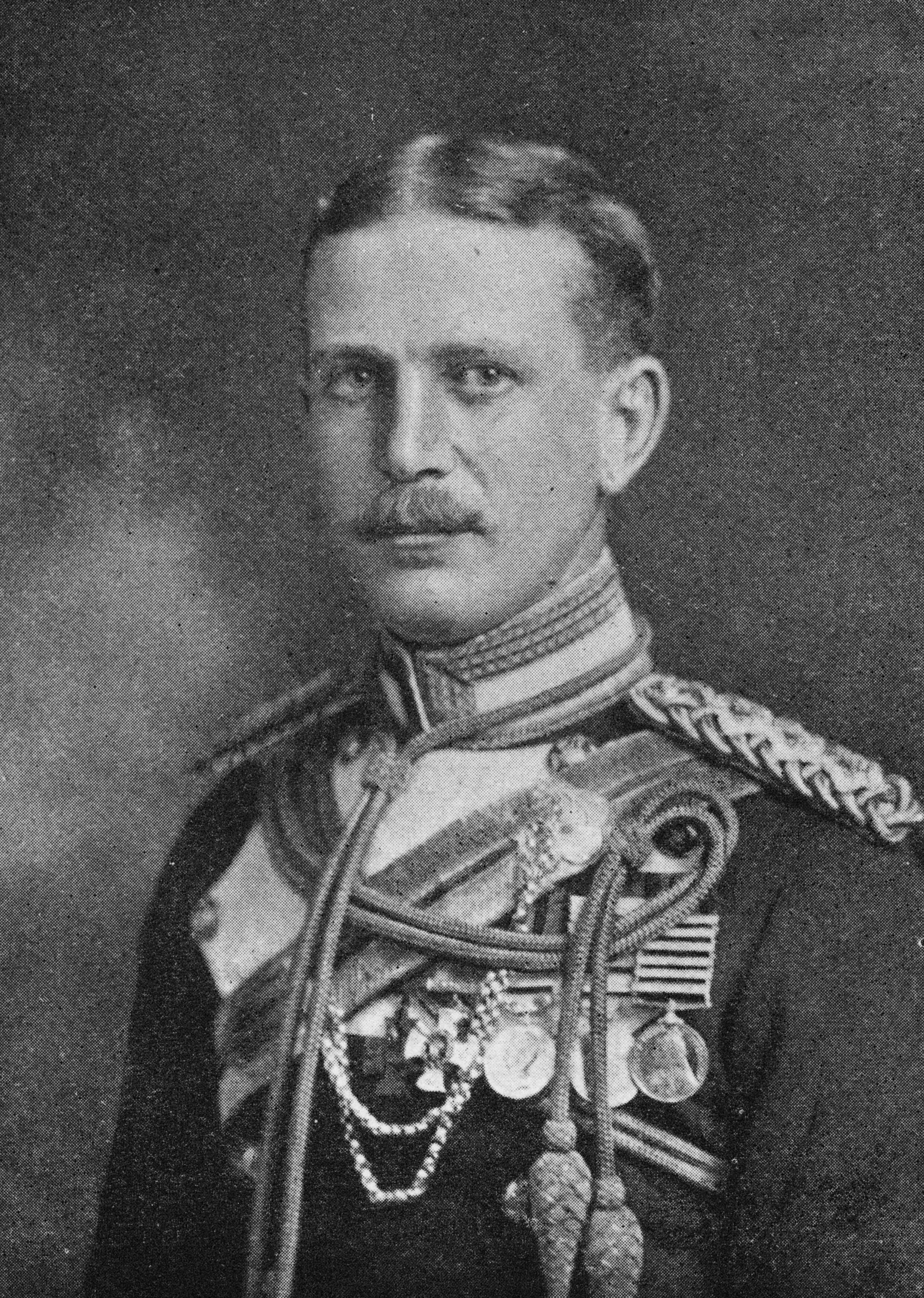
Maxwell pre-1914

Maxwell was 28 years old, and a lieutenant attached to Roberts's Light Horse during the Second Boer War when the following deed took place for which he was awarded the VC:

On 31 March 1900 at Sanna's Post (aka Korn Spruit), South Africa,

Lieutenant Maxwell was one of three Officers not belonging to "Q" Battery, Royal Horse Artillery, specially mentioned by Lord Roberts as having shown the greatest gallantry, and disregard of danger, in carrying out the self-imposed duty of saving the guns of that Battery during the affair at Korn Spruit on 31st March, 1900.

This Officer went out on five different occasions and assisted, to bring in two guns and three limbers, one of which he, Captain Humphreys, and some Gunners, dragged in by hand. He also went out with Captain Humphreys and Lieutenant Stirling to try to get the last gun in, and remained there till the attempt was abandoned.

During a previous Campaign (the Chitral Expedition of 1895) Lieutenant Maxwell displayed gallantry in the removal of the body of Lieutenant-Colonel F. D. Battye, Corps of Guides, under fire, for which, though recommended, he received no reward.

Major Edmund Phipps-Hornby, Sergeant Charles Parker, Gunner Isaac Lodge and Driver Horace Glasock also earned the Victoria Cross in this action.

=== Later service in South Africa ===
Maxwell was promoted to captain on 10 July 1901. He was appointed Aide-de-camp to Lord Kitchener, Commander-in-Chief of the Forces in South Africa. Following the end of hostilities in early June 1902, he left Cape Town on board the SS Orotava together with Lord Kitchener, and arrived at Southampton the next month. He received a brevet promotion to major on 22 August 1902.

== India ==
When Kitchener went to India as commander-in-chief in November 1902, Maxwell joined him there as his aide-de-camp.

He was promoted to the temporary rank of lieutenant colonel in November 1910, while serving as military secretary to the viceroy and governor general of India.

== First World War ==
Almost two years into the First World War Maxwell, promoted in November 1915 to brevet lieutenant colonel, was placed in command of the 12th Battalion, Middlesex Regiment from June to October 1916, for which he was promoted once again to temporary lieutenant colonel while serving as the battalion's commander. In November he was awarded a Bar to his Distinguished Service Order. For his actions taking Thiepval, he was given command of the 18th King George's Own Lancers, Indian Army in October 1916.

As commander of the 12th Middlesex, and later of the 27th Infantry Brigade of the 9th (Scottish) Division, to which he had been appointed to command in October when he was promoted to temporary brigadier general, Maxwell came to be regarded as one of the finest combat commanders serving in the British Expeditionary Force on the Western Front. He was an aggressive commander who was also both an original thinker and popular with his men.

Despite his rank, Maxwell, made a brevet colonel in June 1917, was frequently at the front line. He was killed in action, shot by a German sniper, during the Battle of the Menin Road Ridge on 21 September 1917. He is buried in Ypres Reservoir Commonwealth War Graves Commission Cemetery. The gravestone inscription states: "An ideal soldier and a very perfect gentleman beloved by all his men."

His brother, Lieutenant Colonel Eustace Lockhart Maxwell of the 11th King Edward's Own Lancers (Probyn's Horse), was killed on 20 July 1916 during the Battle of the Somme, whilst commanding the 'bantams' of 23rd Manchester Regiment. He is commemorated on the Neuve-Chapelle Indian Memorial.

General Maxwell is commemorated with a plaque in St. Giles Cathedral on the Royal Mile in Edinburgh, Scotland. Maxwell's medals are now held in the Imperial War Museum as part of the "Lord Ashcroft collection" having been bought at auction for £78,000. His wife, Charlotte Maxwell, published a volume of his edited letters in 1921.

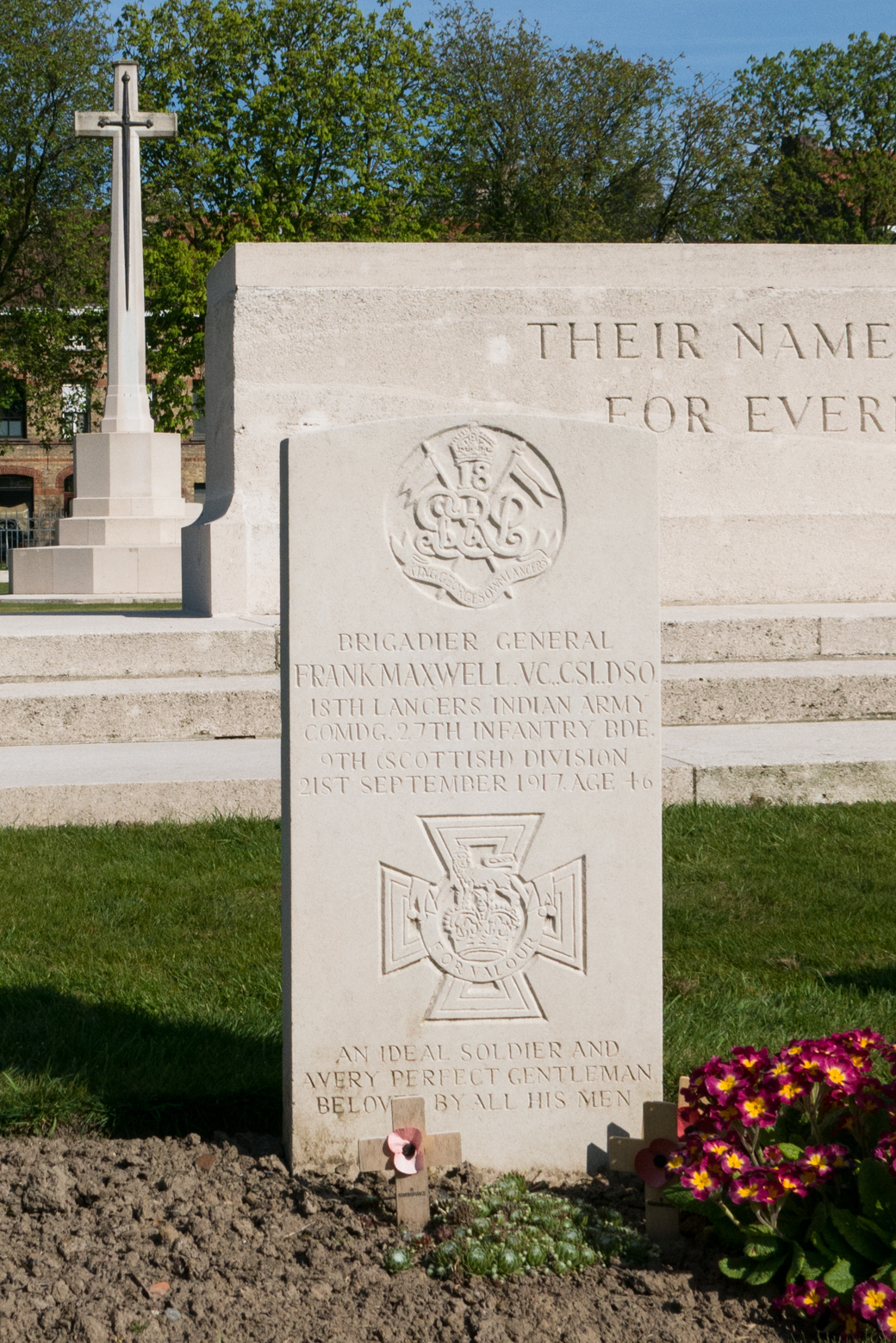
Gravestone in 2015 in Ypres Reservoir Cemetery

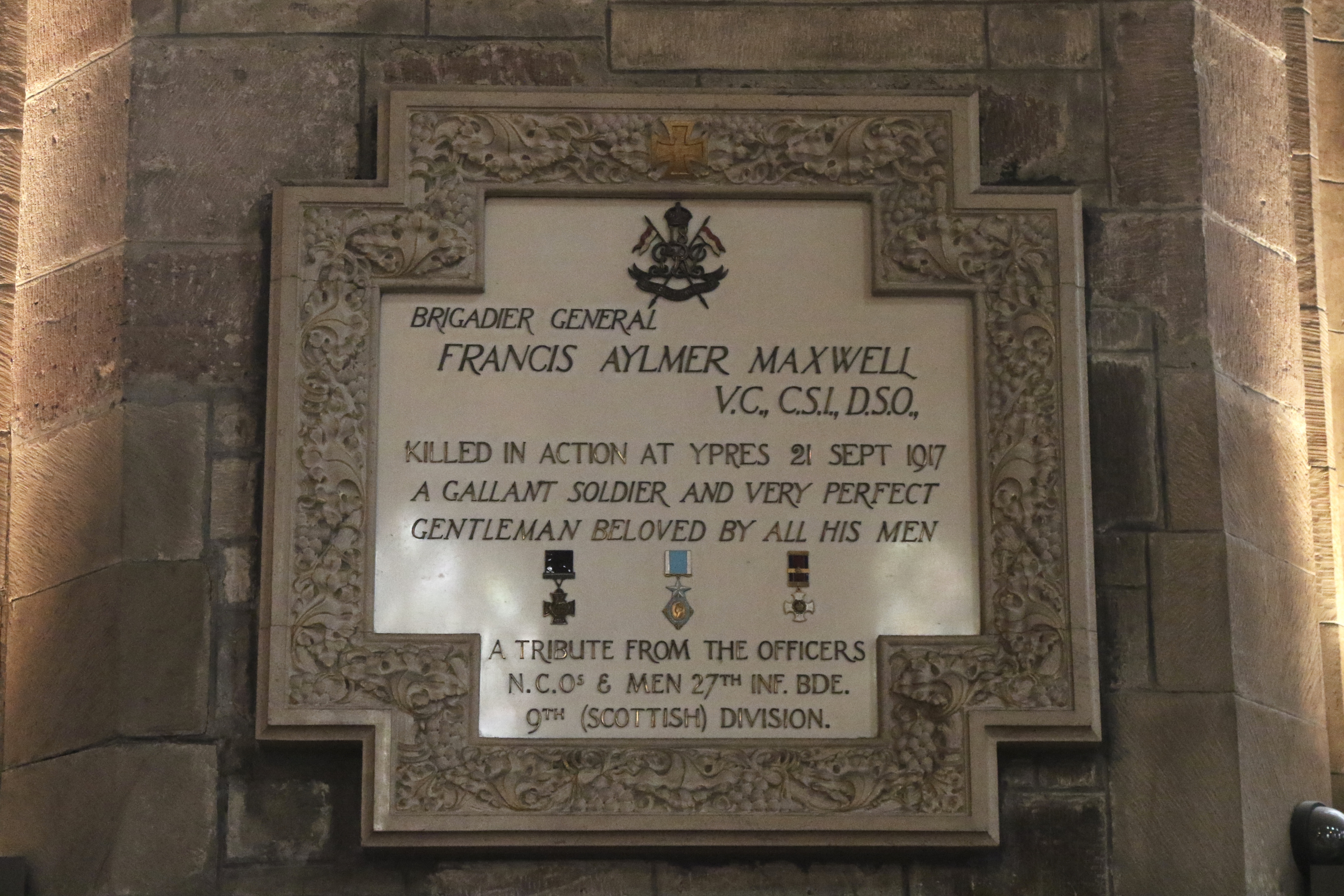
Memorial in St. Giles Cathedral

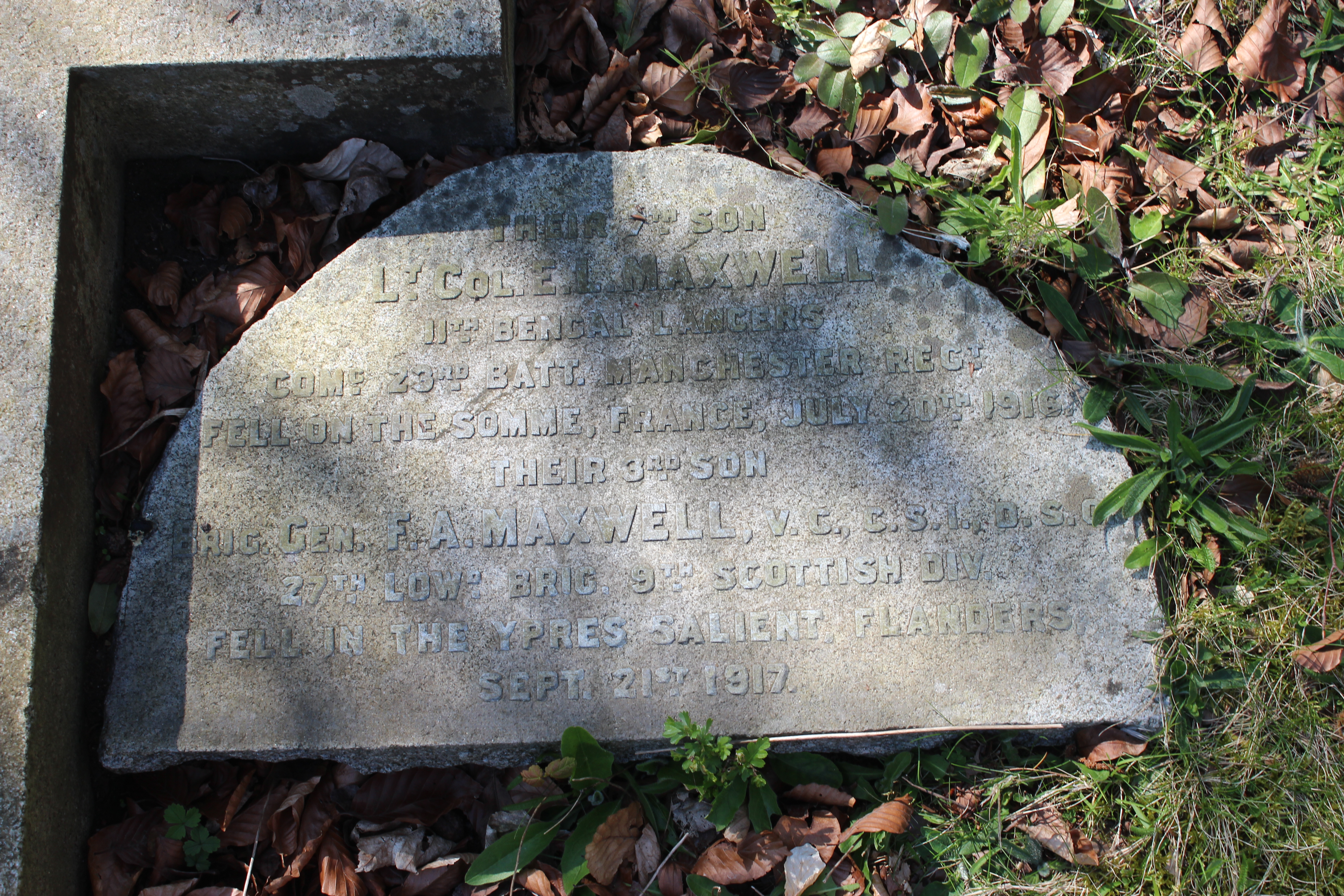
Memorial at Mount Cemetery Guildford

== See also ==
- List of generals of the British Empire who died during the First World War

== Bibliography ==
- Ashcroft, Michael (2007) [2006]. Victoria Cross Heroes. London: Headline Review. ISBN 978-0-7553-1633-5.
- Buzzell, Nora, ed. (1997). The Register of the Victoria Cross. Cheltenham, Gloucestershire: This England Alma House. ISBN 0-906324-27-0.
- Davies, Frank (1997). Bloody Red Tabs: General Officer Casualties of the Great War 1914–1918. London: Pen and Sword Books. ISBN 978-0-85052-463-5.
