= Sanna's Post =

1900 battle of the Second Boer War

Battle of Sanna's Post
- Part of Second Boer War
Date	31 March 1900
Location	near Bloemfontein, Orange Free State, South Africa 29°9′26″S 26°32′8″E
Result	Boer victory

Belligerents
United Kingdom	Orange Free State

Commanders and leaders
Robert Broadwood	Christiaan Rudolf de Wet

Strength
2,000; 12 guns	400 (1,600 distantly engaged)

Casualties and losses
155 dead or wounded 428 prisoners 7 guns	3 dead 5 wounded

The Battle of Sanna's Post (a.k.a. Kroon Spruit) was an engagement fought during the Second Boer War (1899–1902) between the British Empire and the Boers of the two independent republics of the Orange Free State and the South African Republic.

== Background ==
In early 1900, the British army, in overwhelming strength, had occupied Bloemfontein, capital of the Orange Free State, and were preparing to drive north to Pretoria, capital of the Transvaal. Field Marshal Lord Roberts, commander in chief of the British forces, believed that with the capture of the capitals of both republics, the war would be all but over. While the Burghers of the South African Republic prepared to defend their capital, with little prospect of success, the Free State Boers, inspired by President Martinus Steyn, the spiritual heart of the Boer resistance, and Christiaan de Wet, their foremost field general, regrouped and prepared to continue the conflict through unconventional means. Their action at Sanna’s Post was the first large-scale use of guerrilla tactics in this conflict.

On 30 March 1900 a 2,000-man Boer force led by Christiaan De Wet advanced in the direction of Bloemfontein. Reconnaissance indicated the presence of a small garrison of British troops at Sanna’s Post, 23 miles east of Bloemfontein, which held Bloemfontein's water works. A British mounted force under Brigadier General Robert Broadwood which had earlier attacked other Boer positions at Thaba 'Nchu, was withdrawing there. Broadwood's force consisted of Q and U Batteries of the Royal Horse Artillery, a composite regiment of the Life Guards, the 10th Hussars, the Royal Irish Regiment, the New Zealand and Burma Mounted Infantry, and Roberts's Horse and Rimington's Guides (which were light horse units raised from English-speaking South Africans). De Wet sent 1600 of his men under his brother Piet to attack Broadwood from the north, while he himself occupied Sanna's Post to intercept their retreat.

== The action ==
During the darkness De Wet infiltrated a force of riflemen into the ravine created by the Modder River, setting the kill zone of the ambush. At first light on 31 March, Piet de Wet's artillery opened fire from a set of small hills to the north as the British troops were striking camp for the morning. Tactical surprise was complete and all were sent into a state of confusion. The British force began to retreat as expected, in the direction of the ravine where the blocking force awaited with orders from De Wet to hold their fire. The civilian wagon drivers preceding the soldiers were seized by the Boers and told if they warned the British they would be shot. Therefore, the British soldiers suspected nothing and approached the river in small groups. As they did so De Wet’s troops ordered them to surrender, and approximately two hundred were captured, along with the six guns of U Battery.

An alert British officer noticed what was happening and ordered Q Battery to gallop away. De Wet's men then opened fire. The British fell back on a railway station which offered substantial cover, while Q Battery under Major Phipps-Hornby (joined by one gun from U Battery whose team managed to break away from de Wet) deployed in the open and opened fire.

This fire, combined with accurate rifle fire from the railway station, pinned down Christiaan de Wet's men, but Piet de Wet's forces were increasing their pressure. Broadwood's ammunition was running out, and he decided to retire to the south. His guns had first to be recovered. Five were hooked up and towed away, but two had to be abandoned. Many British soldiers were killed crossing the 1300 yards of open ground to retrieve the guns, but unit integrity was maintained.

Eventually, Broadwood managed to break contact. Approximately three hours later the 9th Infantry Division commanded by Major General Sir Henry Colville arrived to relieve the mounted brigade, but de Wet’s men had withdrawn to highly defensible positions across the Modder River and both sides retired from the field. This nevertheless left Bloemfontein's water works in Boer hands.

In all, the British suffered 155 men killed or wounded. 428 men, seven field artillery pieces and 117 wagons were captured. The Boer force suffered three killed and five wounded. But even more serious than the losses in the action was the loss of Bloemfontein's water supplies. This greatly aggravated an epidemic of enteric fever dysentery and cholera among the occupying British army, which eventually caused 2000 deaths.

== Aftermath ==
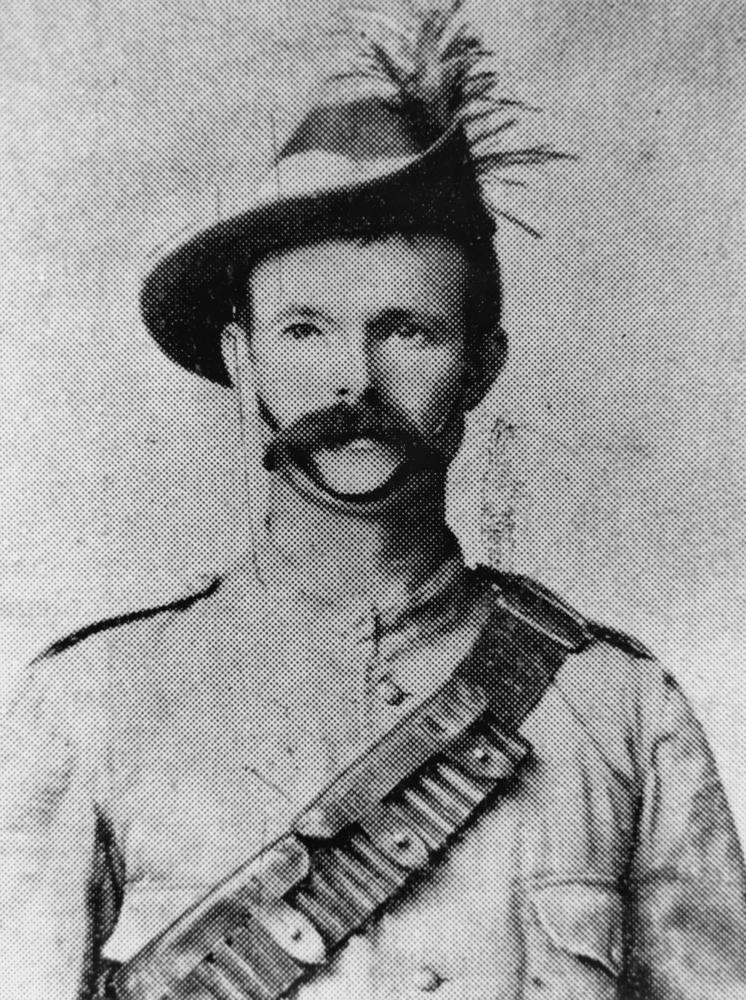
Private H. L. Reece of the 1st Contingent of the Queensland Mounted Infantry was killed in the Battle of Sanna's Post

In recognition of the conspicuous gallantry displayed by all ranks of Q Battery on this occasion, Field Marshal Lord Roberts decided to treat the case as one of collective gallantry, under the Rule 13 of the Victoria Cross Warrant. Accordingly, direction was given that one of the officers should be chosen by the other officers, one noncommissioned officer by the noncommissioned officers and two gunners or drivers by the gunners and drivers for the award of the Victoria Cross.

The men from Q Battery awarded the Victoria Cross were: Major Edmund Phipps-Hornby, Sergeant Charles Parker, Gunner Isaac Lodge, and Driver Horace Henry Glasock.

Q Battery was officially granted the Honour Title "Sanna's Post" on 18 October 1926 in commemoration of this action. As of 2015, it continues to serve as Q (Sanna's Post) Battery in 5th Regiment Royal Artillery.

Field Marshal Lord Roberts also awarded the Victoria Cross to Lieutenant Francis Aylmer Maxwell who voluntarily made five incursions into open terrain under heavy rifle fire to recover two guns and three limbers, one of which was dragged back by hand by himself, another officer and some gunners. Lieutenant Maxwell also attempted to save the third gun from capture, remaining with it until the proximity of the enemy made further efforts impossible.

Lieutenant Maxwell's orderly, Sowar Dost Muhammed Khan of the 18th Bengal Lancers, was awarded the 3rd Class Indian Order of Merit for his gallant actions in support of Lieutenant Maxwell under heavy fire at Sanna’s Post.

== See also ==
- Military history of South Africa

== Bibliography ==
- Clarke, W.G. (1993). Horse Gunners: The Royal Horse Artillery, 200 Years of Panache and Professionalism. Woolwich: The Royal Artillery Institution. ISBN 09520762-0-9.
- M. P. Bossenbroek, Yvette Rosenberg (Translator), The Boer War, Seven Stories Press, New York, NY, 2018. ISBN 9781609807474, 1609807472. Page 233.
- Conan Doyle, Sir Arthur (1900). "Ch. XXII". The Great Boer War. London: George Bell. p. 368.
- Gretton, G. le M. (1911). The Campaigns and History of the Royal Irish Regiment From 1684 to 1902. Edinburgh: William Blackwood & Sons.
- Kruger, Rayne (1983) [1964: New English Library]. Goodbye Dolly Gray: The Story of the Boer War. Pan Books. ISBN 0-330-23861-2.
- de Wet, Christiaan Rudolf (1902). Three Years War (1st American ed.). Charles Scribner's Sons. ISBN 09520762-0-9. Archived from the original on 7 March 2013.
