= Robert Vaughan Gorle =

- Born: 6 May 1896; Southsea, Hampshire
- Died: 9 January 1937 (aged 40); Durban, South Africa
- Burial place: Stellawood Cemetery, Durban
- Military career
- Allegiance: United Kingdom
- Branch: British Army
- Rank: Temporary Lieutenant
- Nickname: Rob
- Units: Royal Field Artillery
- Conflicts: World War I
- Awards: Victoria Cross, 1914–15 Star, British War Medal, Allied Victory Medal 1914-1918
- Other work: Farmer in Northern Rhodesia, Sergeant-at-Arms to the Southern Rhodesian Legislative Assembly, Parliamentary Librarian

Robert Vaughan Gorle VC (6 May 1896 – 9 January 1937) was an English recipient of the Victoria Cross, the highest and most prestigious award for gallantry in the face of the enemy that can be awarded to British and Commonwealth forces.

Gorle was born in Southsea on 6 May 1896 and educated at Malvern College and Rugby School. Prior to the First World War was a farmer in South Africa.

Captain Robert V Gorle before his award

Captain Gorle was promoted to temporary lieutenant in "A" Battery, 50th Brigade, Royal Field Artillery, British Army at Ledeghem, Belgium, during the First World War when he performed the deed for which he was awarded the Victoria Cross. According to VCs of the First World War: The Final Days 1918 by Gerald Gliddon, young Mr Gorle won his award on 1 October. It was the fourth and last battle of Ypres when 50th Brigade supported an attack at the village of Ledegham. The attack began at 06H15 for about 30 minutes of artillery fire. Neither allied troops to the left or right of the British troops had been able to make any progress against the enemy, even with the artillery. This resulted in the line of British troops faltering and beginning to retreat to the north of Ledegham. Upon seeing this, Mr Gorle took it upon himself to charge his gun at the enemy and fire over open sights, not once but three times. When the 38th (Ulster) division saw such gallantry and bravery in the face of the enemy infantry, they rallied to Gorle, and his men with the 18-pounder, and overcame the enemy machine gunner nests on Hill 41. Gorle was decorated nine months and 18 days later in the Quadrangle of Buckingham Palace by King George VI on 19 June 1919. It was a proud moment for his family after his father, Major Harry Vaughan Gorle D.S.O A.S.C., had only narrowly missed being awarded the V.C. too, receiving instead, the DSO for his efforts in the Boer Wars in South Africa.

His citation in the London Gazette of 14 December 1918 reads:

For most conspicuous bravely, initiative and devotion to duty during the attack on Ledeghem. on 1st October, 1918, when in command of an 18-pdr. gun working in close conjunction with infantry. He brought his gun into action in the most exposed positions on four occasions, and disposed of enemy machine guns by firing over open sights under direct machine-gun fire at 500 to 600 yards' range. Later, seeing that the infantry were being driven back by intense hostile fire, he, without hesitation, galloped his gun in front of the leading infantry, and on two occasions knocked out enemy machine guns which were causing the trouble. His disregard of personal safety and dash were a magnificent example to the wavering line, which rallied and re-took the northern end of the village.

Gravestone as it was in 1937

After the war Gorle returned to Africa, eventually settling in Southern Rhodesia where he was appointed as Sergeant-at-Arms to the Southern Rhodesian Legislative Assembly. He died on 9 January 1937 of yellow fever and was buried in Stellawood Cemetery, Durban, South Africa.

Gorle's dress medal miniatures

His VC is on display in the Lord Ashcroft Gallery at the Imperial War Museum, London after being purchased privately in 1993 through an agent from an unknown private seller whom is thought to have been Kevin Patience.
