= Frederick Miller (VC) =

Recipient of the Victoria Cross (1831–1874)

- Born: 10 November 1831; Radway-under-Edge Hill, Warwickshire
- Died: 17 February 1874 (aged 42); Cape Town, South Africa
- Burial place: Garden of Remembrance Observatory
- Military career
- Allegiance: United Kingdom
- Branch: British Army
- Rank: Lieutenant Colonel
- Units: Royal Artillery
- Conflicts: Crimean War
- Awards: Victoria Cross; Légion d'Honneur (France); Order of Medjidie (Ottoman Empire)

Lieutenant-Colonel Frederick Miller VC (10 November 1831 – 17 February 1874) was an English recipient of the Victoria Cross, the highest and most prestigious award for gallantry in the face of the enemy that can be awarded to British and Commonwealth forces.

== Details ==
Miller was 22 years old, and a lieutenant in the Royal Regiment of Artillery, British Army during the Crimean War when the following deed took place at the Battle of Inkerman for which he was awarded the VC.

For having, at the battle of Inkermann, personally attacked three Russians, and with the gunners of his Division of the Battery, prevented the Russians from doing mischief to the guns which they had surrounded. Part of a Regiment of English infantry had previously retired through the Battery in front of this body of Russians.

== Further information ==
He later achieved the rank of lieutenant-colonel. His VC is on display in the Lord Ashcroft Gallery at the Imperial War Museum, London.
