= Horace Henry Glasock =

Recipient of the Victoria Cross

Horace Henry Glasock VC
- Born: 16 October 1880; Islington, London
- Died: 20 October 1916 (aged 36); Cape Town, South Africa
- Burial place: Maitland Road Cemetery #4, Cape Town
- Military career
- Allegiance: United Kingdom; Union of South Africa
- Branch: British Army; South African Army
- Rank: Conductor
- Units: Royal Horse Artillery; South African Service Corps
- Conflicts: Second Boer War; World War I
- Awards: Victoria Cross

Horace Henry Glasock VC (16 October 1880 – 20 October 1916) was an English recipient of the Victoria Cross (VC), the highest award for gallantry in the face of the enemy that may be awarded to British and Commonwealth forces.

Glasock was 19 years old, and a driver in 'Q' Battery, Royal Horse Artillery, British Army during the Second Boer War when the following deed took place for which he was awarded the VC:

== Victoria Cross ==
On 31 March 1900 at Sanna's Post (aka Korn Spruit), South Africa, 'Q' and 'U' batteries of the Royal Horse Artillery were ambushed with the loss of most of the baggage column and five guns of the leading battery. When the alarm was given, 'Q' Battery went into action 1150 yards from the spruit, until the order to retire was received, when Major Phipps-Hornby, commanding officer of the battery, ordered the guns and their limbers to be run back by hand to a safe place. This most exhausting operation was carried out by, among others, Driver Glasock, Sergeant Charles Parker and Gunner Isaac Lodge. When at last all but one of the guns and one limber had been moved to safety, the battery was reformed.

=== Citation ===
The citation reads:

On the occasion of the action at Korn Spruit on the 31st March, 1900, a British force, including two batteries of the Royal Horse Artillery, was retiring from Thabanchu towards Bloemfontein. The enemy had formed an ambush at Korn Spruit, and before their presence was discovered by the main body had captured the greater portion of the baggage column and five out of the six guns of the leading battery. When the alarm was given Q Battery, Royal Horse Artillery, was within 300 yards of the Spruit. Major Phipps-Hornby, who commanded it, at once wheeled about and moved off at a gallop under a very heavy fire. One gun upset when a wheel horse was shot, and had to be abandoned, together with a waggon, the horses of which were killed. The remainder of the battery reached a position close to some unfinished railway buildings and came into action 1,150 yards from the Spruit, remaining in action until ordered to retire. When the order to retire was received Major Phipps-Hornby ordered the guns and their limbers to be run back by hand to where the teams of uninjured horses stood behind the unfinished buildings. The few remaining gunners, assisted by a number of Officers and men of a party of Mounted Infantry, and directed by Major Phipps-Hornby and Captain Humphreys, the only remaining Officers of the battery, succeeded in running back four of the guns under shelter. One or two of the limbers were similarly withdrawn by hand, but the work was most severe and the distance considerable. In consequence all concerned were so exhausted that they were unable to drag in the remaining limbers or the fifth gun. It now became necessary to risk the horses, and volunteers were called for from among the drivers, who readily responded. Several horses were killed and men wounded, but at length only one gun and one limber were left exposed. Four separate attempts were made to rescue these, but when no more hordes were available the attempt had to be given up and the gun and limber were abandoned. Meanwhile the other guns had been sent on, one at a time, and after passing within 700 or 800 yards of the enemy, in rounding the head of a donga and crossing two spruits they eventually reached a place of safety, where the battery was re-formed.

=== Awarding the VC ===
After full consideration of the circumstances of the case the Field-Marshal Commanding-in-chief in South Africa formed the opinion that the conduct of all ranks of Q Battery, Royal Horse Artillery, was conspicuously gallant and daring, but that all were equally brave and devoted in their behaviour. He therefore decided to treat the case of the battery as one of collective gallantry under Rule 13 of the Victoria Cross Warrant, and directed that one Officer should be selected for the decoration of the Victoria Cross by the Officers, one non-commissioned officer by the non-commissioned officers, and two gunners or drivers by the gunners and drivers. A difficulty arose with regard to the Officer because there were only two unwounded Officers—Major Phipps-Hornby and Captain Humphreys—-available for the work of saving the guns, and both of these had been conspicuous by their gallantry and by the fearless manner in which they exposed themselves, and each of them nominated the other for the decoration. It was ultimately decided in favour of Major Phipps-Hornby as having been the senior concerned.

Glasock was one of the gunners and drivers, elected as described above.

Lieutenant Francis Aylmer Maxwell also earned the Victoria Cross in this action.

== Later life ==
Following his service in the Boer War, he remained in the Royal Horse Artillery until 1911, when he was discharged. He then emigrated to South Africa and settled in Johannesburg with his wife. On the outbreak of World War I, he served as a Conductor with Transports and Remounts in the South African Service Corps. Glasock died whilst in service at Cape Town on 20 October 1916, just four days after his 36th birthday. He was buried in Maitland Cemetery, Cape Town.
