= Joseph Charles Brennan =

Recipient of the Victoria Cross (1818–1872)

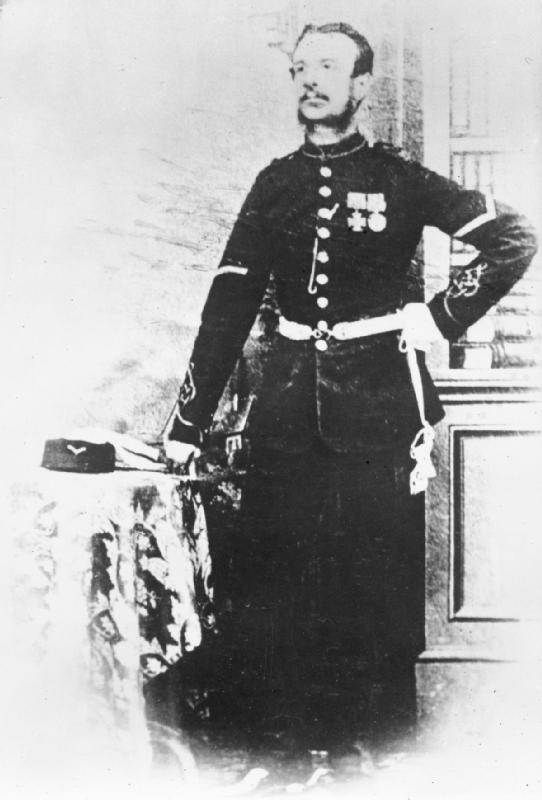
- Born: August 1818; Probus, Cornwall
- Died: 24 September 1872 (aged 54); Folkestone, Kent
- Burial place: Shorncliffe Military Cemetery
- Military career
- Allegiance: United Kingdom
- Branch: British Army
- Rank: Sergeant
- Units: Royal Artillery
- Conflicts: Bhutan War; Indian Mutiny
- Awards: Victoria Cross

Joseph Charles Brennan VC (August 1818 – 24 September 1872) was an English recipient of the Victoria Cross, the highest and most prestigious award for gallantry in the face of the enemy that can be awarded to British and Commonwealth forces.

He was about 39 years old, and a Bombardier in the Royal Regiment of Artillery, British Army during the Indian Mutiny when the following deed took place on 3 April 1858 at Jhansi, India for which he was awarded the VC:

For marked gallantry at the assault of Jhansi, on the 3rd of April 1858, in bringing up two guns of the Hyderabad Contingent, manned by Natives, lying each under a heavy fire from the walls, and directing them so accurately as to compel the Enemy to abandon his battery.

== Further information ==
Brennan was born in Probus, Cornwall. Also served in the Bhutan War. He later achieved the rank of Sergeant.
