= Andrew Henry (VC) =

Recipient of the Victoria Cross

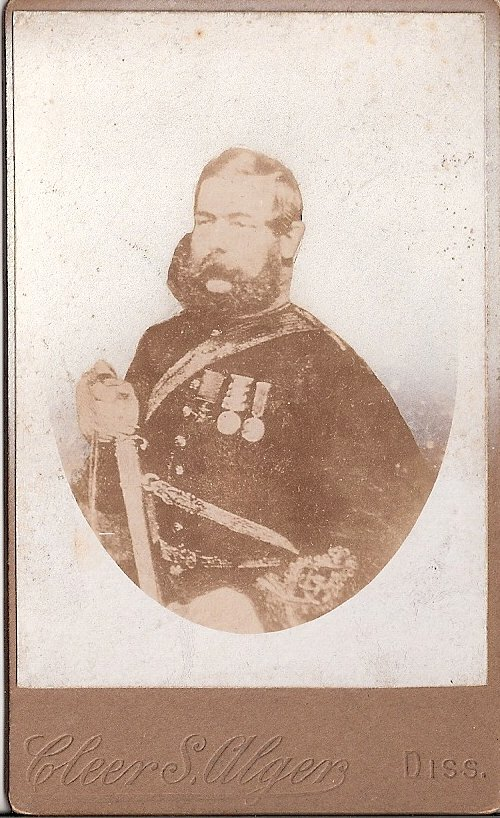
- Captain Andrew Henry VC
- Born: 1 November 1823; Woolwich, London
- Died: 14 October 1870 (aged 46); Plymouth, Devon
- Burial place: Ford Park Cemetery, Plymouth
- Military career
- Allegiance: United Kingdom
- Branch: British Army
- Rank: Captain
- Units: Royal Artillery
- Conflicts: Crimean War
- Awards: Victoria Cross; Medal of Military Valor (Sardinia)

Andrew Henry VC (1 November 1823 – 14 October 1870) was an English recipient of the Victoria Cross.

== VC action ==
Henry received the second Victoria Cross awarded to the Royal Regiment of Artillery for successfully defending his gun at the Battle of Inkerman against heavy odds. Although severely wounded for this action he was also commissioned in the field.

He was at the time of the action a sergeant major of 'G' Battery Royal Artillery when on a foggy November morning in 1854 Russian troops launched a surprise attack on the British lines and quickly surrounded the Battery. Soon Sgt Andrew Henry was the only British soldier left. With his sword in one arm and using the other to pull a bayonet from his leg he fought valiantly. Sgt Henry received twelve bayonet wounds but lived to receive the Victoria Cross.

== Further information ==
He later achieved the rank of captain. 49 (Inkerman) Battery of the 16th Regiment Royal Artillery is named for the battle of the same name which took place during the Crimean War.

== The medal ==
His Victoria Cross is displayed at the Royal Artillery Museum in Woolwich, London.
