= Gronow Davis =

English Victoria Cross recipient (1828-1891)

Major-General Gronow Davis VC
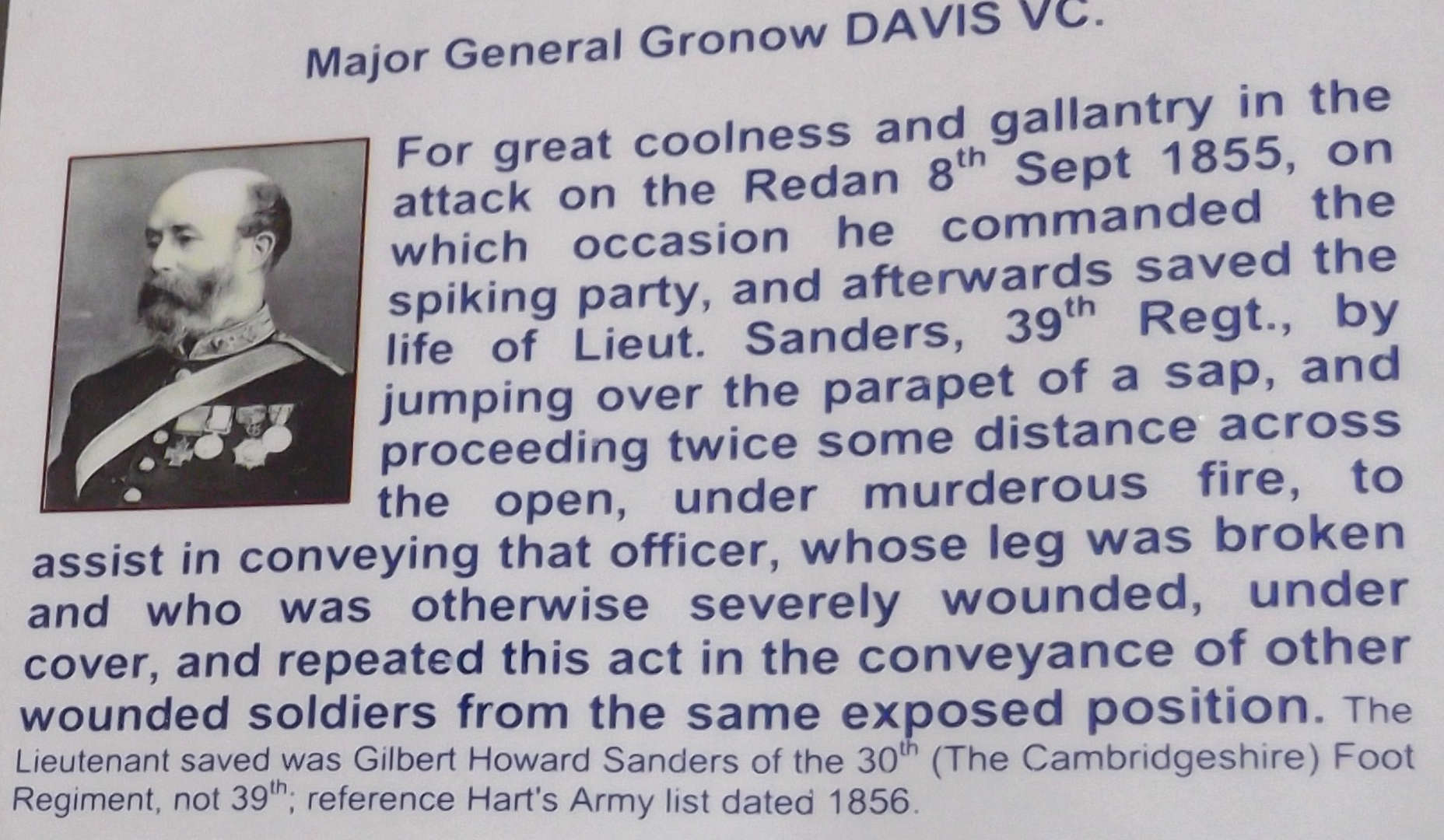
- Davis's VC citation at the Royal Artillery Museum, London
- Born: 16 May 1828; Clifton, Bristol
- Died: 18 October 1891 (aged 63); Clifton
- Burial place: Arnos Vale Cemetery, Bristol
- Military career
- Allegiance: United Kingdom
- Branch: British Army
- Rank: Major-General
- Units: Royal Artillery
- Conflicts: Crimean War
- Awards: Victoria Cross; Order of the Medjidieh (Ottoman Empire)

Major-General Gronow Davis VC (16 May 1828 – 18 October 1891) was an English recipient of the Victoria Cross, the highest and most prestigious award for gallantry in the face of the enemy that can be awarded to British and Commonwealth forces.

== Details ==
Davis was 27 years old, and a captain in the Royal Regiment of Artillery, British Army during the Crimean War when the following deed took place for which he was awarded the VC.

On 8 September 1855 at Sebastopol, Crimea, Captain Davis commanded the spiking party in the attack on the Redan with great coolness and gallantry. Afterwards he saved the life of a lieutenant of the 39th Regiment of Foot by jumping over the parapet of a sap and going some distance across the open, under murderous fire, to help carry the wounded man to cover. He also carried several other wounded soldiers to safety.

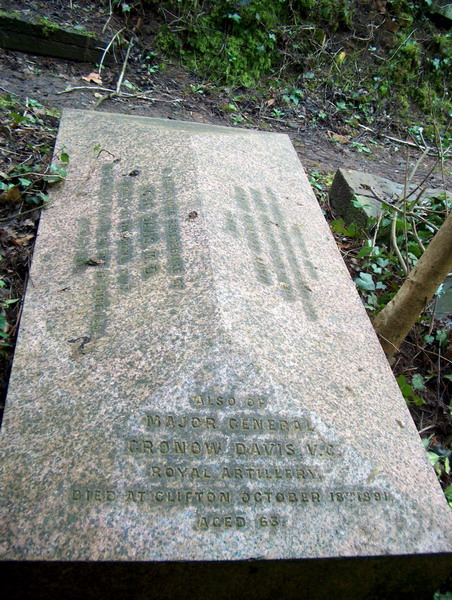
Major-General Davis's grave

He later achieved the rank of major-general. His Victoria Cross is displayed at the Royal Artillery Museum, Woolwich, England.
