= Frederick Henry Bradley =

Recipient of the Victoria Cross

Frederick Henry Bradley VC VD
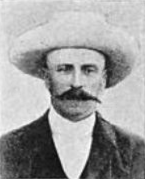
- Born: 27 September 1876; Kingsland, London, England
- Died: 10 March 1943 (aged 66); Gwelo, Rhodesia
- Burial place: Gwelo Cemetery
- Military career
- Allegiance: United Kingdom; South Africa
- Branch: British Army; South African Army
- Service years: 1894–1908; 1910–1938
- Rank: Major
- Units: Royal Artillery
- Conflicts: Second Boer War; Bambatha Rebellion; First World War: South West Africa campaign; Western Front
- Awards: Victoria Cross; Colonial Auxiliary Forces Officers' Decoration

Frederick Henry Bradley, VC, VD (27 September 1876 – 10 March 1943) was a British Army officer and an English recipient of the Victoria Cross, the highest award for gallantry in the face of the enemy that can be awarded to British and Commonwealth forces.

He was 24 years old, and a driver in the 69th Battery, Royal Field Artillery during the Second Boer War when the following deed took place at Itala, South Africa for which he was awarded the VC:

During the action at Itala, Zululand, on the 26ih September, 1901, Major Chapman called for volunteers to carry ammunition up the hill; to do this a space of about 150 yards swept by a heavy cross fire had to be crossed. Driver Lancashire and Gunner Bull at once came forward and started, but half-way across Driver Lancashire fell wounded. Driver Bradley and Gunner Rabb without a moment's hesitation ran out and caught Driver Lancashire up, and Gunner Rabb carried him under cover, the ground being swept by bullets the whole time. Driver Bradley then, with the aid of Gunner Boddy, succeeded in getting the ammunition up the hill.
