= Charles Parker (VC) =

Recipient of the Victoria Cross

Charles Parker VC
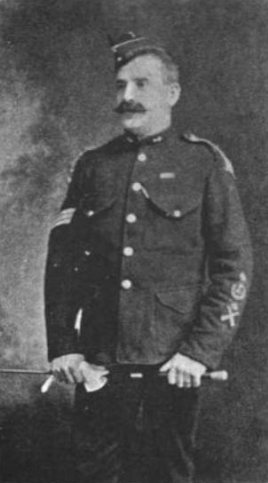
- Born: Charles Edward Haydon Parker; 10 March 1870; St Johns, London, England
- Died: 9 August 1918 (aged 48); Coventry, Warwickshire, England
- Burial place: London Road Cemetery, Coventry
- Military career
- Allegiance: United Kingdom
- Branch: British Army
- Service years: 1885–1918
- Rank: Sergeant-Major
- Units: Royal Horse Artillery Royal Field Artillery
- Conflicts: Second Boer War; World War I
- Awards: Victoria Cross

Charles Edward Haydon Parker (10 March 1870 – 9 August 1918) was an English recipient of the Victoria Cross (VC), the highest and most prestigious award for gallantry in the face of the enemy that can be awarded to British and Commonwealth forces.

== Details ==
Parker was born in Woolwich to a William (a Crimean War veteran) and Louisa Parker. He was 30 years old, and a sergeant in "Q" Battery, Royal Horse Artillery, British Army, during the Second Boer War when the following deed took place for which he was awarded the VC:

On 31 March 1900 at Sanna's Post (a.k.a. Korn Spruit), South Africa, "Q" and "U" Batteries of the Royal Horse Artillery were ambushed with the loss of most of the baggage column and five guns of the leading battery. When the alarm was given, "Q" Battery went into action 1,150 yards from the spruit, until the order to retire was received, when Major Edmund Phipps-Hornby, commander of "Q" Battery, ordered the guns and their limbers to be run back by hand to a safe place. This most exhausting operation was carried out by, among others, Sergeant Parker, Gunner Isaac Lodge and Driver Horace Glasock, and when at last all but one of the guns and one limber had been moved to safety, the battery was reformed. The citation reads:

On the occasion of the action at Korn Spruit on the 31st March, 1900, a British force, including two batteries of the Royal Horse Artillery, was retiring from Thabanchu towards Bloemfontein. The enemy had formed an ambush at Korn Spruit, and before their presence was discovered by the main body had captured the greater portion of the baggage column and five out of the six guns of the leading battery. When the alarm was given Q Battery, Royal Horse Artillery, was within 300 yards of the Spruit. Major Phipps-Hornby, who commanded it, at once wheeled about and moved off at a gallop under a very heavy fire. One gun upset when a wheel horse was shot, and had to be abandoned, together with a waggon, the horses of which were killed. The remainder of the battery reached a position close to some unfinished railway buildings and came into action 1,150 yards from the Spruit, remaining in action until ordered to retire. When the order to retire was received Major Phipps-Hornby ordered the guns and their limbers to be run back by hand to where the teams of uninjured horses stood behind the unfinished buildings. The few remaining gunners, assisted by a number of Officers and men of a party of Mounted Infantry, and directed by Major Phipps-Hornby and Captain Humphreys, the only remaining Officers of the battery, succeeded in running back four of the guns under shelter. One or two of the limbers were similarly withdrawn by hand, but the work was most severe and the distance considerable. In consequence all concerned were so exhausted that they were unable to drag in the remaining limbers or the fifth gun. It now became necessary to risk the horses, and volunteers were called for from among the drivers, who readily responded. Several horses were killed and men wounded, but at length only one gun and one limber were left exposed. Four separate attempts were made to rescue these, but when no more hordes were available the attempt had to be given up and the gun and limber were abandoned. Meanwhile the other guns had been sent on, one at a time, and after passing within 700 or 800 yards of the enemy, in rounding the head of a donga and crossing two spruits they eventually reached a place of safety, where the battery was re-formed. After full consideration of the circumstances of the case the Field-Marshal Commanding-in-chief in South Africa formed the opinion that the conduct of all ranks of Q Battery, Royal Horse Artillery, was conspicuously gallant and daring, but that all were equally brave and devoted in their behaviour. He therefore decided to treat the case of the battery as one of collective gallantry under Rule 13 of the Victoria Cross Warrant, and directed that one Officer should be selected for the decoration of the Victoria Cross by the Officers, one non-commissioned officer by the non-commissioned officers, and two gunners or drivers by the gunners and drivers. A difficulty arose with regard to the Officer because there were only two unwounded Officers – Major Phipps-Hornby and Captain Humphreys – available for the work of saving the guns, and both of these had been conspicuous by their gallantry and by the fearless manner in which they exposed themselves, and each of them nominated the other for the decoration. It was ultimately decided in favour of Major Phipps-Hornby as having been the senior concerned.

Parker was elected by the non-commissioned officers as described above. He returned to the United Kingdom in early 1901, and received the VC from King Edward during an investiture at Marlborough House 25 July 1901.

Lieutenant Francis Maxwell also earned the VC in this action.

== Later life ==
After 21 years of service in the Royal Horse Artillery, he retired and settled in Coventry. On the outbreak of the Great War, he initially worked in a munitions factory, but soon decided to rejoin and was posted to France with the Royal Field Artillery as a Battery Sergeant Major. In 1918, the father of two was badly wounded and forced to return home. He never recovered from his wounds, and died aged 48 on 9 August 1918. He was buried in London Road Cemetery, Coventry, and now has a Commonwealth War Graves Commission headstone.

== The medal ==
His Victoria Cross is displayed at the Royal Artillery Museum, Larkhill Wiltshire, England.
