= Tafelkop =

Tafelkop rite
- Location within Limpopo Location within South Africa
- Coordinates: 25.046°S 29.509°E
- Country: South Africa
- Province: Limpopo
- District: Sekhukhune
- Municipality: Elias Motsoaledi

Area
  - Total: 25.21 km^{2} (9.73 sq mi)

Population (2011)
  - Total: 35,691
  - Density: 1,416/km^{2} (3,667/sq mi)

Racial makeup (2011)
  - Black African: 99.5%
  - Coloured: 0.1%
  - Indian/Asian: 0.1%
  - White: 0.1%
  - Other: 0.1%

First languages (2011)
  - Northern Sotho: 83.7%
  - S. Ndebele: 7.2%
  - Zulu: 2.9%
  - English: 2.7%
  - Other: 3.5%
- Time zone: UTC+2 (SAST)
- PO box: 0474

Tafelkop is a town in Sekhukhune District Municipality in the Limpopo province of South Africa.
