= Thomas Arthur (VC) =

Recipient of the Victoria Cross

Thomas Arthur VC
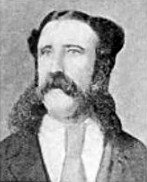
- Born: 1835; Abbotsham, Devon, England
- Died: 2 March 1902 (aged 66–67); Savernake, Wiltshire, England
- Burial place: Cadley churchyard, Wiltshire
- Military career
- Allegiance: United Kingdom
- Branch: British Army
- Rank: Gunner & Driver
- Units: Royal Artillery
- Conflicts: Crimean War
- Awards: Victoria Cross

Thomas Arthur (1835 – 2 March 1902) was a British Army soldier and recipient of the Victoria Cross, the highest award for gallantry in the face of the enemy that can be awarded to British and Commonwealth forces.

== Victoria Cross action ==
Arthur was approximately 20 years old, and a gunner and driver in the Royal Regiment of Artillery during the Crimean War when the following deed took place for which he was awarded the VC.

On 7 June 1855 at Sebastopol, Crimea, Gunner Arthur was in charge of the magazine in one of the left advanced batteries of the right attack, when the Quarries were taken. On his own initiative he carried barrels of infantry ammunition for the 7th Fusiliers several times during the evening, across the open. He volunteered for and formed one of the spiking party of artillery at the assault on the Redan on 18 June 1855 and on numerous occasions left the trenches to bring in wounded officers and men.

His Victoria Cross is displayed at the Royal Artillery Museum, Woolwich, London.
