= Hastings Edward Harrington =

Recipient of the Victoria Cross

Hastings Edward Harington
- A contemporary portrait of Harington
- Born: 9 November 1832
- Died: 20 July 1861 (aged 29); Agra, India
- Burial place: Agra Cemetery
- Military career
- Allegiance: United Kingdom
- Branch: Bengal Army; British Indian Army
- Service years: 12 June 1852 – 20 July 1861
- Rank: Captain
- Units: Bengal Artillery
- Conflicts: Indian Mutiny
- Awards: Victoria Cross

Hastings Edward Harington VC (9 November 1832 – 20 July 1861) was an English recipient of the Victoria Cross, the highest and most prestigious award for gallantry in the face of the enemy that can be awarded to British and Commonwealth forces.

== Background ==
Harington was born in St Peter Port, Guernsey in 1832, the son of a reverend, and educated at Reading School and the East India Company Military Seminary, Addiscombe, Surrey.

== Military career ==
Harington's military career began on 12 June 1852, when he was commissioned as a 2nd Lieutenant in the Bengal Artillery. During the Indian Mutiny he was severely wounded at Trimmoo Ghat. He was present throughout the Siege of Delhi, and after the fall of the city he proceeded with the Grethed's column towards Cawnpore, taking an active part in the engagements at Maligurh Fort, Allygurh and Agra. He was present at the relief of the garrison at Lucknow, where he risked his life rescuing a wounded soldier, his courage gaining him the Victoria Cross. He was elected for the VC by the vote of his fellow officers. During these operations he was most dangerously wounded.

He then took part in the pursuit of the rebels towards Rohileund until he was severely wounded at Rooyah. This last wound compelled him to go to the Himalayas to recover his health; but deriving only temporary relief and still being troubled by a bullet which remained in his back, he returned to England, where after undergoing an operation the bullet was extracted. His health being partially restored he returned to duty in October 1860. Shortly after his arrival in India he proceeded on service with the Sikkim Field Force. He was afterwards appointed adjutant 6th Battalion Bengal Artillery at Agra, where he died from cholera on 20 July 1861, having achieved the rank of captain. He was buried in Agra Cemetery.

== The Victoria Cross ==
Harington was 25 years old, and a Lieutenant in the Bengal Artillery, Indian Army during the Indian Mutiny when the following deeds took place at the Relief of Lucknow for which he was awarded the VC, the citation reading as follows:

Lieutenant Hastings Edward Harington [and others] Elected respectively, under the 13th clause of the Royal Warrant of the 29th of January, 1856, by the Officers and non-commissioned officers generally, and by the private soldiers of each troop or battery, for conspicuous gallantry at the relief of Lucknow, from the 14th to the 22nd of November, 1857.

— London Gazette, 24 December 1858.

His family sold the medal in 2024.
