= John Crawshaw Raynes =

- Born: 28 April 1887; Sheffield, West Riding of Yorkshire
- Died: 12 November 1929 (aged 42); Leeds, West Riding of Yorkshire
- Burial place: Harehills Cemetery, Leeds
- Military career
- Allegiance: United Kingdom
- Branch: British Army
- Service years: 1904 - 1912, 1914 - 1918
- Rank: Battery Sergeant Major
- Units: Royal Field Artillery
- Conflicts: World War I
- Awards: Victoria Cross
- Other work: Police officer

John Crawshaw Raynes VC (28 April 1887 – 12 November 1929) was an English recipient of the Victoria Cross, the highest and most prestigious award for gallantry in the face of the enemy that can be awarded to British and Commonwealth forces.

Raynes, from Sheffield in the West Riding of Yorkshire, joined the Royal Horse and Field Artillery in 1904 and served until 1912, then joined the Leeds police force. However, he was still suffering from the effects of gas poisoning contracted during his VC action and struggled to continue his duties as a policeman, eventually being forced to take a desk job.

== Details ==
He was 28 years old, and an Acting Sergeant in the 'A' Battery 71 Brigade, Royal Field Artillery, British Army during the First World War when the following deed took place for which he was awarded the VC.

On 11 October 1915 at Fosse 7 de Bethune, France, Sergeant Raynes went to the assistance of another sergeant who was lying wounded. He bandaged the injured man and returned to his gun, then, when the battery ceased firing, carried the wounded man to a dug-out and when gas shelling started, put his own gas helmet on his injured comrade and, badly gassed himself, went back to his gun. The next day he was buried, with others, under a house which had been shelled. As soon as he had been extricated he insisted on helping to rescue the others, then, having had his wounds dressed, reported for duty. The medal is in the collection of the Royal Artillery Museum.

== Further information ==
He later achieved the rank of Battery Sergeant Major.

On his death the following was noted: His funeral took place in the presence of nineteen Victoria Cross recipients, eight of which were Yorkshire VC. Holders. The Yorkshire VC’s were; Captain George Sanders, Lieutenant Wilfred Edwards, Sergeant Fred McNess, Sergeant Charles Smith Hull, Sergeant Albert Mountain, Lance Corporal Frederick W Dobson, Private Arthur Poulter, Private William Boynton Butler who were acting as pallbearers. The 71st Field Brigade Royal Artillery provided the gun carriage that carried the coffin of Mr Raynes, followed by the chairman of the LEEDS “Old Contemptibles Association”, Captain W.E. Gage, carrying a purple cushion with JCR’s medals upon it a wreath of Flanders poppies and evergreen in the shape of a Victoria Cross was carried by Lieutenant Edwards. The wreath was intended as a souvenir for JCR from the VC Dinner at the House of Lords. The wreath bore the message “In affectionate memory from brother VC’s of Leeds, who sorely missed their comrade at the Prince of Wales’s dinner, whence this emblem was brought for him.” Mr Raynes was intended to go to the dinner but he had to give his apologies, he asked if his son John Kenneth, age 18 would be able to take his place.

Mr Raynes received a telegram on Armistice Day from the other Yorkshire VC’s who attended the dinner, stating that they regretted that he could not attend and complete the party, sending their greetings. They promised him a memento of the dinner, (the VC shaped wreath). The service was held at St Clement’s Church, with the Lord and Lady Mayor and the Chief Constable in attendance, along with a squad of police.

He was buried at Harehills Cemetery, Leeds. A firing squad was arranged and provided by the West Yorkshire Regiment and the Last Post was sounded. The cemetery gates had to be closed due to the number of people that were there to pay their respects, an estimated 25 to 30,000. So was the popularity of John Crawshaw Raynes.

== Bibliography ==
- Batchelor, Peter; Matson, Christopher (2011). The Western Front 1915. VCs of the First World War. The History Press. ISBN 978-0-7524-6057-4.
- Oldfield, Paul (2015). Victoria Crosses on the Western Front, April 1915–June 1916. Pen and Sword Books. ISBN 978-1783030439.
