= List of Second Boer War Victoria Cross recipients =

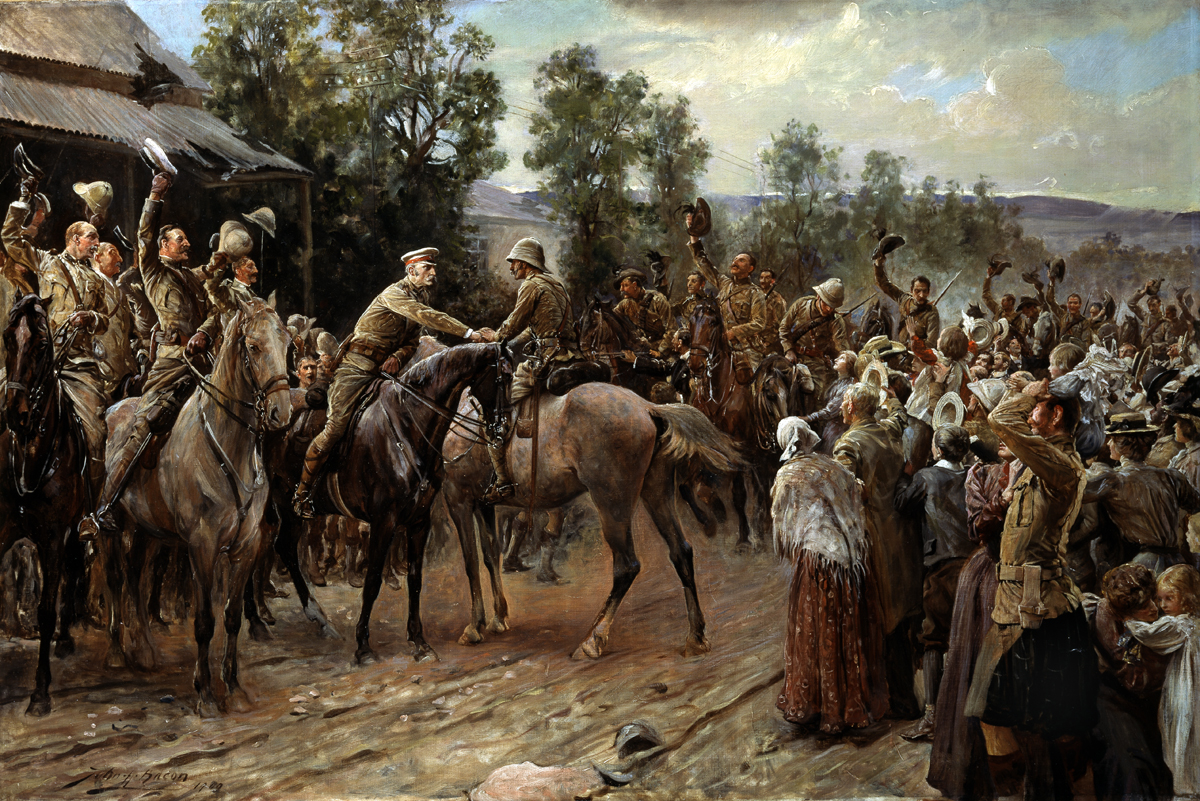
A painting of the Relief of Ladysmith depicting Sir George Stuart White greeting Major Hubert Gough on 28 February 1900, as portrayed in a painting by John Henry Frederick Bacon.

The Victoria Cross (VC) is a British military honour awarded to 78 members of the British Armed Forces for action during the Second Boer War. The Victoria Cross is a military decoration awarded for valour "in the face of the enemy" to members of the armed forces of some Commonwealth countries and previous British Empire territories. The VC was introduced in Great Britain on 29 January 1856 by Queen Victoria to reward acts of valour during the Crimean War, and takes precedence over all other orders, decorations and medals. It may be awarded to a person of any rank in any service and to civilians under military command. The first ceremony was held on 26 June 1857, when Queen Victoria invested 62 of the 111 Crimean recipients in Hyde Park.

The Second Boer War was fought from 11 October 1899 to 31 May 1902, between the British Empire and the two independent Boer republics of the Orange Free State and the South African Republic (Transvaal Republic). After a set of failed negotiations over foreigner land rights in the territories, led by Joseph Chamberlain, both sides issued ultimatums. When the ultimatums were rejected, war was declared. The war had three distinct phases. First, the Boers mounted pre-emptive strikes into British-held territory in Natal and the Cape Colony, besieging the British garrisons of Ladysmith, Mafeking and Kimberley. The Boers then won a series of tactical victories against a failed British counteroffensive to relieve the three sieges. The second phase began after British forces under Frederick Roberts, 1st Earl Roberts, launched counteroffensives with increased troop numbers. After Natal and the Cape Colony were secure, the British were able to invade the Transvaal and the republic's capital, Pretoria, was captured in June 1900. The third phase began in March 1900, when the Boers engaged a protracted hard-fought guerrilla warfare against the British forces. In an effort to cut off supplies to the raiders, the British, now under the leadership of Lord Kitchener, responded with a scorched earth policy of destroying Boer farms and moving civilians into concentration camps.

The British Government had expected the campaign to be over within months, and the protracted war became increasingly unpopular especially after revelations about the conditions in the concentration camps. Emily Hobhouse, a campaigner, had forced the British Government to set up the Fawcett Commission, led by suffragist Millicent Fawcett, into the conditions at the camps. Hobhouse published reports from the camps which told of thousands of deaths from disease and malnutrition. These reports helped to sway public opinion against the war. The demand for peace led to a settlement of hostilities, and in 1902, the Treaty of Vereeniging was signed. The two republics were absorbed into the British Empire, although the British were forced to make a number of concessions and reparations to the Boers. The granting of limited autonomy for the area ultimately led to the establishment of the Union of South Africa.

The original Royal Warrant, was silent on whether the VC could be awarded posthumously. From 1857 until 1897, 18 recipients were gazetted after their deaths but only 12 of the next of kin received the actual medal. In the other six cases there was a memorandum stating that they would have been recommended for the VC had they survived. By 1899, the precedent had been established that the VC could be awarded posthumously if the recommendation for the award was submitted prior to the recipient's death from wounds. Two such awards were granted during the Second Boer War, the well known award to Frederick Roberts, the son of Lord Roberts, and to Francis Parsons. In 1900 and 1901, three memoranda were issued for Herman Albrecht, Robert Digby-Jones and David Younger stating they would have been recommended for the VC had they survived. In a partial reversal of policy restricted to the Second Boer War, it was announced in the London Gazette on 8 August 1902, that the next of kin of the three soldiers mentioned in memoranda would be sent medals. In the same gazette, the first three posthumous awards were gazetted to Alfred Atkinson, John Barry and Gustavus Coulson. In 1907, the posthumous policy was reversed and medals were sent to the next of kin of the remaining six officers and men. Although the Victoria Cross warrant was not amended to specifically include posthumous awards until 1920, one quarter of all awards for the First World War were posthumous.

== Recipients ==
- This and the * indicate a posthumous award

Recipients
Name	Unit	Date of action	Place of action
Herman Albrecht	Imperial Light Horse	6 January 1900*	Ladysmith, South Africa
Alfred Atkinson	Yorkshire Regiment	18 February 1900*	Battle of Paardeberg, South Africa
William Babtie	Royal Army Medical Corps	15 December 1899	Battle of Colenso, South Africa
John Barry	Royal Irish Regiment	7 January 1901*	Monument Hill, South Africa
William Bees	Sherwood Foresters	30 September 1901	Moedwil, South Africa
Harry Beet	Derbyshire Regiment	22 April 1900	Wakkerstroom, South Africa
Frederick Bell	West Australian Mounted Infantry	16 May 1901	Brakpan, South Africa
John Bisdee	Tasmanian Imperial Bushmen	1 September 1900	Warm Bad, South Africa
Frederick Bradley	Royal Field Artillery	26 September 1901	Itala, South Africa
Edward Brown	14th Hussars	13 October 1900	Geluk, South Africa
John Clements	Rimington's Guides	24 February 1900	Strijdenburg, South Africa
Hampden Cockburn	Royal Canadian Dragoons	7 November 1900	Komati River, South Africa
Walter Congreve	Rifle Brigade	15 December 1899	Battle of Colenso, South Africa
Gustavus Coulson	King's Own Scottish Borderers	18 May 1901*	Lambrechtfontein, South Africa
Harry Crandon	18th Royal Hussars	4 July 1901	Springbok Laagte, South Africa
Thomas Crean	Imperial Light Horse	18 December 1901	Tygerkloof Spruit, South Africa
Albert Curtis	East Surrey Regiment	23 February 1900	Onderbank Spruit, South Africa
Robert Digby-Jones	Royal Engineers	6 January 1900*	Ladysmith, South Africa
Henry Douglas	Royal Army Medical Corps	11 December 1899	Magersfontein, South Africa
Alexis Doxat	Imperial Yeomanry	20 October 1900	Zeerust, South Africa
Frederic Dugdale	5th Lancers	3 March 1901	Derby, South Africa
Alfred Durrant	Rifle Brigade	27 August 1900	Bergendal, South Africa
Henry Engleheart	10th Hussars	13 March 1900	Bloemfontein, South Africa
William English	Scottish Horse	3 July 1901	Vlakfontein, South Africa
Donald Farmer	Queen's Own Cameron Highlanders	13 December 1900	Nooitgedacht, South Africa
James Firth	Duke of Wellington's Regiment	24 February 1900	Arundel near Colesberg, South Africa
Charles FitzClarence	Royal Fusiliers	14 October 1899	Mafeking, South Africa
Horace Glasock	Royal Horse Artillery	31 March 1900	Korn Spruit, South Africa
William Gordon	Gordon Highlanders	11 July 1900	Krugersdorp, South Africa
Harry Hampton	King's (Liverpool) Regiment	21 August 1900	Van Wyk's Vlei, South Africa
William Hardham	4th New Zealand Contingent	28 January 1901	Naauwpoort, South Africa
William Heaton	King's (Liverpool) Regiment	23 August 1900	Geluk, South Africa
Edward Holland	Royal Canadian Dragoons	7 November 1900	Komati River, South Africa
William House	Royal Berkshire Regiment	2 August 1900	Mosilikatse Nek, South Africa
Neville Howse	New South Wales Army Medical Corps	24 July 1900	Vredefort, South Africa
Alfred Ind	Royal Horse Artillery	20 December 1901	Tafelkop, South Africa
Edgar Inkson	Royal Army Medical Corps	24 February 1900	Colenso, South Africa
Robert Johnston	Imperial Light Horse	21 October 1899	Battle of Elandslaagte, South Africa
Charles Kennedy	Highland Light Infantry	22 November 1900	Dewetsdorp, South Africa
Frank Kirby	Royal Engineers	2 June 1900	Delagoa Bay Railway, South Africa
Henry Knight	King's (Liverpool) Regiment	21 August 1900	Van Wyk's Vlei, South Africa
Brian Lawrence	17th Lancers	7 August 1900	Essenbosch Farm, South Africa
Isaac Lodge	Royal Horse Artillery	31 March 1900	Korn Spruit, South Africa
John MacKay	Gordon Highlanders	20 May 1900	Johannesburg, South Africa
Conwyn Mansel-Jones	West Yorkshire Regiment	27 February 1900	Tugela, South Africa
Horace Martineau	Protectorate Regiment	26 December 1899	Mafeking, South Africa
Arthur Martin-Leake	South African Constabulary	8 February 1902	Vlakfontein, South Africa
James Masterson	Devonshire Regiment	6 January 1900	Ladysmith, South Africa
Francis Maxwell	Roberts's Light Horse	31 March 1900	Korn Spruit, South Africa
Leslie Maygar	5th Victorian Mounted Rifles	23 November 1901	Geelhoutboom, South Africa
Maury Meiklejohn	Gordon Highlanders	21 October 1899	Battle of Elandslaagte, South Africa
John Milbanke	10th Hussars	5 January 1900	Colesberg, South Africa
Charles Mullins	Imperial Light Horse	21 October 1899	Battle of Elandslaagte, South Africa
William Nickerson	Royal Army Medical Corps	20 April 1900	Wakkerstroom, South Africa
John Norwood	5th Dragoon Guards	30 October 1899	Ladysmith, South Africa
George Nurse	Royal Field Artillery	15 December 1899	Battle of Colenso, South Africa
Charles Parker	Royal Horse Artillery	31 March 1900	Korn Spruit, South Africa
Francis Parsons	Essex Regiment	18 February 1900*	Battle of Paardeberg, South Africa
Edmund Phipps-Hornby	Royal Horse Artillery	31 March 1900	Korn Spruit, South Africa
James Pitts	Manchester Regiment	6 January 1900	Caesar's Camp, South Africa
Llewelyn Price-Davies	King's Royal Rifle Corps	17 September 1901	Blood River Poort, South Africa
Horace Ramsden	Protectorate Regiment	26 December 1899	Mafeking, South Africa
George Ravenhill	Royal Scots Fusiliers	15 December 1899	Battle of Colenso, South Africa
Hamilton Reed	Royal Field Artillery	15 December 1899	Battle of Colenso, South Africa
Arthur Richardson	Strathcona's Horse	5 July 1900	Wolwespruit, South Africa
Frederick Roberts	King's Royal Rifle Corps	15 December 1899*	Battle of Colenso, South Africa
William Robertson	Gordon Highlanders	21 October 1899	Battle of Elandslaagte, South Africa
James Rogers	South African Constabulary	15 June 1901	Thaba Nchu, South Africa
Harry Schofield	Royal Field Artillery	15 December 1899	Battle of Colenso, South Africa
Robert Scott	Manchester Regiment	6 January 1900	Caesar's Camp, South Africa
John Shaul	Highland Light Infantry	11 December 1899	Magersfontein, South Africa
Beachcroft Towse	Gordon Highlanders	11 December 1899	Magersfontein, South Africa
William Traynor	West Yorkshire Regiment	6 February 1901	Bothwell Camp, South Africa
Richard Turner	Royal Canadian Dragoons	7 November 1900	Komati River, South Africa
Charles Ward	King's Own Yorkshire Light Infantry	26 June 1900	Lindley, South Africa
Guy Wylly	Tasmanian Imperial Bushmen	1 September 1900	Warm Bad, South Africa
Alexander Young	Cape Police	13 August 1901	Ruiterskraal, South Africa
David Younger	Gordon Highlanders	11 July 1900*	Krugersdorp, South Africa
