= George Dewhurst (Radical and Reformer) =

English Radical, reformer and reedmaker

- Born: 8 August 1789; Blackburn, Lancashire, England
- Died: 14 August 1857 (aged 68); Blackburn, Lancashire, England
- Burial place: Blackburn Cemetery
- Occupations: Reedmaker, reformer, politician
- Known for: Radicalism, reformation
- Spouse(s): Ann Green, Alice Hitchen
- Children: Hanson Dewhurst, Alice Dewhurst, George Dewhurst, Mary Dewhurst
- Parent(s): George Dewhurst, Ann Hanson

George Dewhurst (8 August 1789 – 14 August 1857) was an English Radical, reformer and reedmaker, best known for his contribution towards working class Radicalism in the first half of the 19th century and reform in his home town of Blackburn.

== Early life ==
George Dewhurst was born in the English town of Blackburn on 8 August 1789, one of seven children of George Dewhurst the elder and his wife Ann Hanson. His father was a whitesmith and grocer of the town.

George Dewhurst married Ann Green in February 1810 and the couple had four children together (Hanson, Alice, George and Mary) before Ann's untimely death in 1816. He married his second wife, Alice Hitchen, in November 1823.

Dewhurst was a reed maker by trade, providing reeds for the weaving and calico industry. He remained in this line of work for a large part of his life, despite this traditionally handcrafted process being increasingly mechanised (reeds originally made from strips of reed became replaced by flattened brass and steel wire and began to be made by machinery.

== Radical beginnings ==
George Dewhurst could scarcely have been born at a time more resonant with the hope and possibility of betterment for the poor, together with the fear, despair and anger that such change would never be realised. It was a time ripe for a man such as George Dewhurst, whose life was to be defined by fighting against injustice and reforming the conditions of the working men, women and children of his hometown of Blackburn.

The French Revolution began the year of Dewhurst's birth, and the possibility of a similar upheaval befalling the established order in England must have been occupying the thoughts and haunting the dreams of the privileged. The prevailing sense of corruption in politics (such as the rotten and pocket boroughs denying proper representation of people's grievances) was compounded by the financial constraints caused by the end of the Napoleonic War, the tariffs and trade restrictions of the Corn Laws and the burden of taxation. Throughout the country there was an increase in British political radicalism and restlessness to improve the lot of the working poor.

In addition to the general maladies affecting the country as a whole, workers in areas such as Blackburn, dependent so much on cotton, were threatened continually with the onward march of industrialisation in the factories and the fluctuations in the price of raw materials. As Abram points out:

About the time that Dewhurst reached man’s estate, the labouring populations of these Northern Counties were in a state of furious resentment against the master-manufacturers who were developing the factory system. It was an extension of the "Luddites"’ rising in the Midlands in 1811. Some rapacious attacks upon property, accompanied by threats against obnoxious persons, and more than one murder, occurred on the Lancashire and Yorkshire border. At the close of the war, in 1815, the stagnation of all manufacturing trades ensued, and the distress amongst the people was dreadful and long-continued. At length the starving populace were roused to a pitch of dangerous rage against the Government and Legislature. The Corn Tax which had been levied aggravated the want and wretchedness which prevailed amongst the cottagers, and a bitter cry went up for its repeal. This was the origin of the political upheaval in Lancashire which, commencing in 1816, lasted several years, all the time menacing revolution, filling the propertied classes with alarm, and as it grew more portentous in its manifestations, causing the Government and the magistracy, under the influence of panic, to resort to measures of excessive severity in repressing the organized and tumultuous demonstrations of the disaffected section of the industrial class.

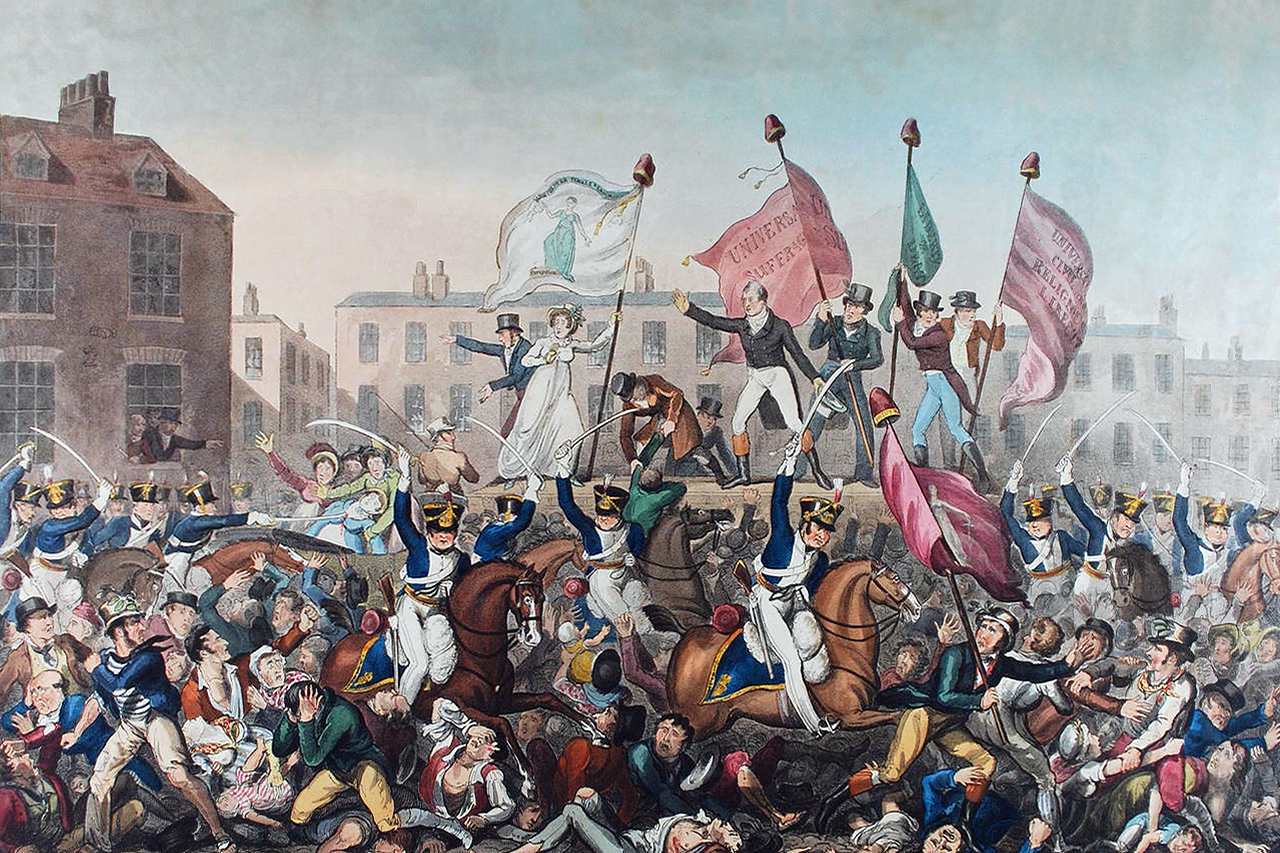
A coloured print of the Peterloo Massacre published by Richard Carlile

It was this upheaval that prompted those like George Dewhurst to act, and he did so with increasing fervour. He became involved in a number of meetings that Radicals like him hoped would persuade the authorities to improve conditions. He promoted an open-air meeting at Factory Hill in 1816 - to urge an extension of the franchise and a repeal of the Corn Laws - and a number of others in the three years that followed. He became "by dint of earnestness, downrightness, and the use of plain, forceful Saxon words" someone who "understood and felt by the most illiterate of his hearers".

This agitation and confrontation with the authorities was to come to a head on 16 August 1819 in what is now known as the Peterloo Massacre where a cavalry charge into a crowd of several thousand people in Manchester led to the deaths of eighteen people and the injury of many hundreds of others.

Though no doubt aware of the tragedy in Manchester (and possibly present at the event although that is currently unknown) Dewhurst still attended and addressed a further meeting of Radicals only three months later (15 November 1819) at Habergham Eaves near Burnley and was soon after arrested on a charge of high treason. Abram contends that simultaneous to the events in Manchester the Government was determined to deal a blow to other Radical leaders and that the Magistrates of the Blackburn Hundred had been keeping a close eye on Dewhurst as one of the most egregious facilitators of the revolt.

== Arrest and imprisonment ==
A number of newspapers, both local and national, recorded the arrest of Dewhurst and his co-accused. The Blackburn Mail (8 December 1819):

On Thursday evening last, December 2nd, George Dewhurst, reedmaker, John Adamson, tailor, Joseph Fletcher, tailor, and two other men in custody, were examined before the Rev. T. D. Whitaker, LL.D., and Joseph Feilden, Esq., when they were severally committed to Preston House of Correction for further examination. The prisoners Dewhurst, Fletcher, and Adamson are charged with having, on the 15th November last, at Habergham Eaves, near Burnley, traitorously conspired and combined together, with other wicked and traitorous persons, to the number of 10,000 and upwards, and, in pursuance of the said traitorous conspiracy, at the time and place aforesaid, with having armed themselves with divers pikes, pistols, clubs, staves, and other offensive weapons, and with having thereby, then and there, levied war against the King, in order, by force and constraint, to compel his said Majesty to change his measures and councils, and to intimidate and overawe the Houses of Parliament.

The next day, following further questioning at Preston by Colonel Hargreaves, Dewhurst, Fletcher and Adamson were committed to Lancaster Gaol on a charge of High Treason.

The consequent trial took place on 1 April 1820 at Lancaster Assizes under Mr Justice Bayley. It was certainly not a propitious time to face justice as the Cato Street conspirators had been captured less than two months earlier. Dewhurst was sentenced to two years imprisonment at Lancaster Gaol. As recorded in the delivery of Gaol documents at the end of the two years Dewhurst was further instructed to find sureties of £40 and enter into recognizance to keep the peace and be of good behaviour for three years longer.

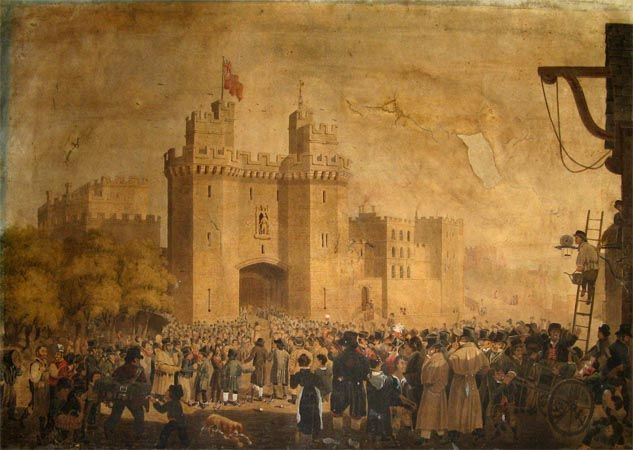
Arrival of Prisoners at Lancaster Castle, 1827

Dewhurst petitioned Parliament in May 1820 regarding his ill-treatment complaining that he had been made to do hard labour and "compelled to wear the felon's dress". This is just one indication of the hardship that he endured during his imprisonment, further insights can be gained from a letter he wrote in August 1821 from his cell at Lancaster. Although the full text of the document is no longer available, Abram in his book on Blackburn Characters provides a number of extracts that gave an idea of what Dewhurst endured.

A friend of Dewhurst, C. Cottam (a fellow Reedmaker) had visited him in gaol and was horrified at the thought of human beings having to spend years in such conditions and having to be "confined within a yard about twenty yards long and ten broad."

Perhaps most moving is the copy of a petition he had sent to the Annual Meeting of County Justices held in Preston in June 1821 in which hopes for his sentence to be commuted:

I was arrested the 2nd day of December, 1819, upon a charge of high treason, for attending a legal and peaceable meeting at Burnley. Afterwards I was committed to this jail, and kept under that dreadful charge for 12 weeks. At the following Assizes I was tried for a misdemeanour, found guilty, and sentenced to two years’ imprisonment in this jail. That I have been confined to the Crown side of the prison ever since, and subjected to the same privations and restrictions as felons and the Bridewell prisoners are. The yard which is allotted for walking in is small, and is surrounded with such high buildings that the air breathed therein" is very unwholesome. "The restrictions thought necessary for the government of the Crown prisoners have prevented me from yielding to the repeated solicitations of my parents, who are very anxious that they and my children may come to see me; but it would be a useless journey of 30 to 40 miles to see each other through a small aperture of a door." "Death has for ever deprived me of one boy, about seven years old, since I came here. I appeal to you as fathers, whether my anxiety to see my children will not be greater in consequence of that event. I shall not speak of my own conduct during my incarceration, but I will refer you to the keepers.

Dewhurst was finally released in the Spring of 1822 and must have welcomed the opportunity to return home and be reunited with his children. He must have also been aware of the stipulation made when sentenced to keep the peace and be of good behaviour. A widower before he was imprisoned, he married Alice Hitchen on 9 November 1823 and returned to reedmaking.

The deprivations of prison however did not keep Dewhurst quiet for long. Three years later he was again speaking on behalf of the poor, specifically on the evil of taxation:

I am certain, that if the money wrung from the people, to support idleness and extravagance, was distributed amongst us, every man, woman, and child, in the kingdom, would have plenty to eat.

He then made a reference to his imprisonment, and its injustice:

Did I ever recommend violence? No. But because I called upon the people to come forward, and demand their rights, I was dragged from my family to a dungeon.

However, the feeling of indignation in this speech and the prevailing sense of injustice it spoke of foreshadowed not further attempts at reform in Blackburn but the determination to start anew in the United States.

== Travel to America ==
Between 1826 and 1827 there was renewed distress in Blackburn and great difficulty in trade. This depression left only about one third of the population around Blackburn in work and the consequent hardship led inexorably to robberies and even mob violence including an attack on the house of the clerk to justices and passengers on market coaches. Gooderson further records that a large crowd destroyed power looms in Accrington and Blackburn and fatalities occurred in a conflict between soldiers and rioters outside a mill in Grimshaw Park.

The privations endured by the poor around Blackburn (and doubtless similar towns) were truly severe:

When a doctor called to attend the birth of a weaver's child in Eanam, he found the child delivered, but already dead, alongside its mother lying half dead from starvation in a heap of straw. The Blackburn workhouse was full to bursting. Local landowners distributed food and money and employed men in clearing woods, while the local relief committee distributed oatmeal, bacon, East India rice and treacle. Blankets were in desperately short supply, and vinegar had to be given to sufferers from typhus.

It is likely as a result of this difficulty (and possibly to start a new life for himself now that his imprisonment was behind him) that George Dewhurst made the decision to set sail to America. One certainly gets the feeling that he would not be sorry to escape contact with what he described (only the year before he left for America) as "the pestilential breath of the English Parliament".

He was certainly not the only inhabitant of Blackburn to make such a decision. An article in the Blackburn Mail comments on increasing numbers travelling to America to seek better conditions, but warns that things might not always be as positive as they seem:

We learn that a great number of weavers, and others in the town, have been prevailed upon in consequence of the distress of the times, to embark to America, and that others are preparing to follow their example. If these people go in the expectation of bettering their condition, we fear they will find themselves woefully mistaken. Numerous instances have occurred where parties have gone over under this idea, but when they reached their destination, would gladly have paid a double price to have returned to their native land; and we have this week been favoured with the perusal of a letter written by a person, formerly an inhabitant of this town, and now resident at Poughkeepsie, near New York, and who had a little property when he left, but is now obliged to sell it to support himself! He communicates a fact, which it will be well for all emigrantly disposed persons to consider, viz. 'that all weaving is done by power looms' and that he, himself, has been without work for the last two years.

It is known that George Dewhurst travelled from Liverpool on 22 July 1827 to New York on the Dalhousie Castle, a "fine fast-sailing ship" of 470 tons with accommodation for passengers that were "extensive and very comfortable", and "with beds and bedding at the ship's expense".

Remarkably, an aurora borealis was recorded by the Captain Robert Walton in the Dalhousie Castle log whilst Dewhurst was on board. The event took place on Tuesday 28 August 1827, South of Nova Scotia, about a week before Dewhurst arrived in America. We can only hope he was on deck to see the sight.

Tuesday, August 28th, 1827.— As daylight closed, the moon had a remarkably red aspect, the sky was clear, and stars brilliant. At 9,30, a dark cloud was rising to the northward, and soon afterwards strong perpendicular rays of light were seen from the N. E. to N. N. W.— these rays rose in shape of a cone, or to a point, the lower part resembling much the tail of a comet, becoming now and then more or less bright. This continued till 10 o’clock, (in which interval the moon had sunk below the horizon) when a far stronger ray of light appeared in the N. W. in width about eight or nine degrees, and which ascended to thirty five degrees. After remaining stationary a short time, it ascended till it reached the zenith, and afterwards formed an arc. This continued till about 11, 30, when the upper part inclining to the southward, gradually died away. The dark cloud remained stationary all this time, from fifteen to twenty degrees high, and till midnight, and the strong light from N. E. to N. N. W. continued till after one, A. M.— the intermediate space between the lower part of the cloud and horizon filled with a dense haze. On the 27th, we experienced squally weather with rain and bright lightning. The whole of the 28th was fine weather with light breezes. On the 29th fine weather with light breezes. No appearance during the evening or night of the light. [The situation of the ship at 10, P. M. was lat, 42° 12’ N. lon. 63° 9’ W]

Dewhurst arrived in America on 6 September 1827 but so far no more is known of his time there, or the exact date of his return to Blackburn (although this cannot have been later than 1830). It seems that Dewhurst met with little success in the United States, and Abram reports that some of his old neighbours made fun of him for having discovered that the "American Republic was no better than, if so good as, king-lord-squire-and-parson-ridden England". Dewhurst himself said on his return to England that he had found plenty of 'black coats' (persons who lived without working) in America, in truth more than in England.

Upon his return, perhaps after a short respite, Dewhurst once again became involved in the political fray. This was reported by another Blackburn citizen Thomas Rogerson who reported his activities to the then Home Secretary Robert Peel in November 1830:

Sir

A few weeks ago I sent you a copy of the Rules and Resolutions of the Blackburn Political Union and I now send a copy of an Advertisement from the same party signed by order of the Political Council, callings public meeting to be holden on Monday next - one of the principal leaders is George Dewhurst who was imprisoned in 1819 for his seditious conduct and since then he has been to America but not succeeding there he returned here saying he had done with politics - perhaps it would have been will for himself and the peace of this district if he had remained quiet - I think Dewhurst and his colleagues wish by their unions and meetings to keep the public mind (at least the labouring classes) in a state of ferment and I thought it right to send you a copy of each of the bills to appraise you of their proceedings.

Dewhurst offered me each of the enclosed to print knowing full well that I should refuse them - his object in offering them to me was no doubt to hold me up to the scorn of his radical party and the boast that even the liberty of the press (as they call it) was denied them in this town.

I am Sir, your obedient servant, Thomas Rogerson.

The disapprobation of Rogerson did little to diminish Dewhurst's enthusiasm for reforming politics and he was to go on to play a significant role in the future political and social development of Blackburn.

== The work of reform 1830–1857 ==
=== The Great Reform Act ===
Across the country inequalities in society and the suffering of the populace created a longing for reform that was both pressing and widespread. The memory of earlier revolutions in France and America, together with the hardships caused by the Corn Laws exacerbated the situation, as did the growing cause of Radicalism. The authorities responded to these threats to the status quo with greater repression and the use of spies to root out dissent. The clamour for reform would not be subdued however and another revolution in France in July 1830 strengthened the argument that reform was necessary to prevent a similar event from happening in England.

Schama argued that the view previously held by the political elite - that they could calm the populace with repressive measures alone, without the need to make any reforms - had collapsed. The argument now was simply to decide the "wisest means of self-preservation", and it was determined that the best way to achieve this was to extend the franchise through electoral reform. After some parliamentary wrangling the Great Reform Act of 1832 was passed. An indication of the demand for such legislation was evident when a setback in 1831, which looked like it might scupper the Act, led to widespread riots and demonstrations throughout the country. This included Blackburn, where petitions in favour of the Reform bill had been raised and "inflammatory speeches" were made at the Political Union which met weekly.

Some Radicals opposed the bill as they felt it did not go far enough (a leading example being Henry Hunt, who became known as "Orator Hunt" after his speech at Peterloo. George Dewhurst however strongly supported the Act, so much so that he was willing to work with those who might be considered political rivals to help bring it about. At a meeting at Blakey Moor in Blackburn to support the bill he walked arm-in-arm with William Feilden (the local Conservative). The event was recorded by Durham:

... the extreme Radical was linked side by side with the gentry and clergy of all denominations; political rancour and religious bickerings were all cast aside to assist in carrying "the bill, the whole bill and nothing but the bill.

Dewhurst's support for the bill came at the cost of a disagreement with his friend the aforementioned Henry Hunt. Hunt suggested that Dewhurst had, at least for a time, "deserted the working classes, and joined his more opulent neighbours by supporting the Reform Bill". The disagreement is recollected in The Preston Chronicle which recalls Dewhurst congratulating a Blackburn audience on the passing of the Bill which he regarded as a stepping stone to further reform. Apparently Hunt was "stung to the quick" by this remark and argued that the Reform Bill would prove to be "one of the worst measures ever passed for the working classes ..".

Dewhurst further emphasised the ongoing progress of reform in a speech made at a reform meeting in Blackburn in August 1835 and quoted by Lewis:

If the spirits of those departed Reformers who agitated in 1819, 1826, and 1830 could be called from their graves they could not credit that this is the same country in which they then lived, amidst the terrors and oppression of Tory misrule. (Cheers.) . .. It had been the fate of other nations to fight for their freedom, and to lose it in the struggle; but happily the people of England have found out a different way. (Cheers). They had a better weapon than the sword, and that weapon was public opinion. (Continued cheering.)

Whatever reservations were harboured by Hunt, the Reform Act of 1832 brought significant changes to the electoral system of the United Kingdom including extending the franchise to Blackburn as a two-member constituency. This was a significant step forward in the fight for universal suffrage, notwithstanding the fact that only those who had property at a rateable value of £10 and above were eligible to vote (thus excluding the majority of men and all women). It can be imagined that Dewhurst felt that having representation for the town at a national level could only be advantageous.

=== Early parliamentary elections in Blackburn ===
==== Blackburn's first election 1832 ====
Initially it seemed like Blackburn's first election - described by Miller as Blackburn's birth as a political entity - might pass without too much rancour. John Fleming was appointed the returning officer and the process began on Tuesday 11 December 1832 with nominations being made in the Lower Tacketts Field where hustings had been set up next to the Theatre. William Feilden was looked upon positively as a candidate who had expressed a wish to represent his home town for some time, and the Radicals in Blackburn (amongst them George Dewhurst) chose Dr Bowring as their candidate. Bowring was recommended by the well-known social reformer and philosopher Jeremy Bentham and was keenly supportive of the radical cause as well as being highly accomplished. Interestingly, he was also from a Unitarian background, having once aspired to be a minister in the church. This was another point of commonality with Dewhurst who was a dissenter in the same Unitarian tradition (see 'Religion' below in the section entitled 'Political, social and economic views').

As the two parties representing Feilden and Bowring got on tolerably well with each other, it was felt that the two candidates would be sent to Parliament without the need for a contest. They had, however, not reckoned with William Turner, who dramatically "threw his hat in the ring" at the last minute and was to change both the nature of the poll and its anticipated outcome:

William Turner came forward almost like a bombshell, offering himself to the 'free and independent electors' of both parties. To him must be awarded the palm of being the first to deluge the borough with drink. On his arrival in Blackburn, being a great employer of labour, and the Turner family being highly popular with the working classes, a large crowd collected in front of the Old Bull Hotel . . Barrels of beer were then rolled into the yard of our ancient Parish Church, the ends were knocked out, and the people debauched with drink, and that over the very graves which contained the ashes of their forefathers.

According to Durham, Turner's entry into the contest alarmed the "High Church and State" party, who as a result put forward their own candidate - John Fowden Hindle. As there were now more than two nominations, the election was a contested one and the first day of polling began the following morning until 4 o'clock in the afternoon.

The candidates were William Feilden, William Turner, Dr John Bowring (Dewhurst's man and strongly supported by the radicals) and John Fowden Hindle who decided to retire before the polling commenced.

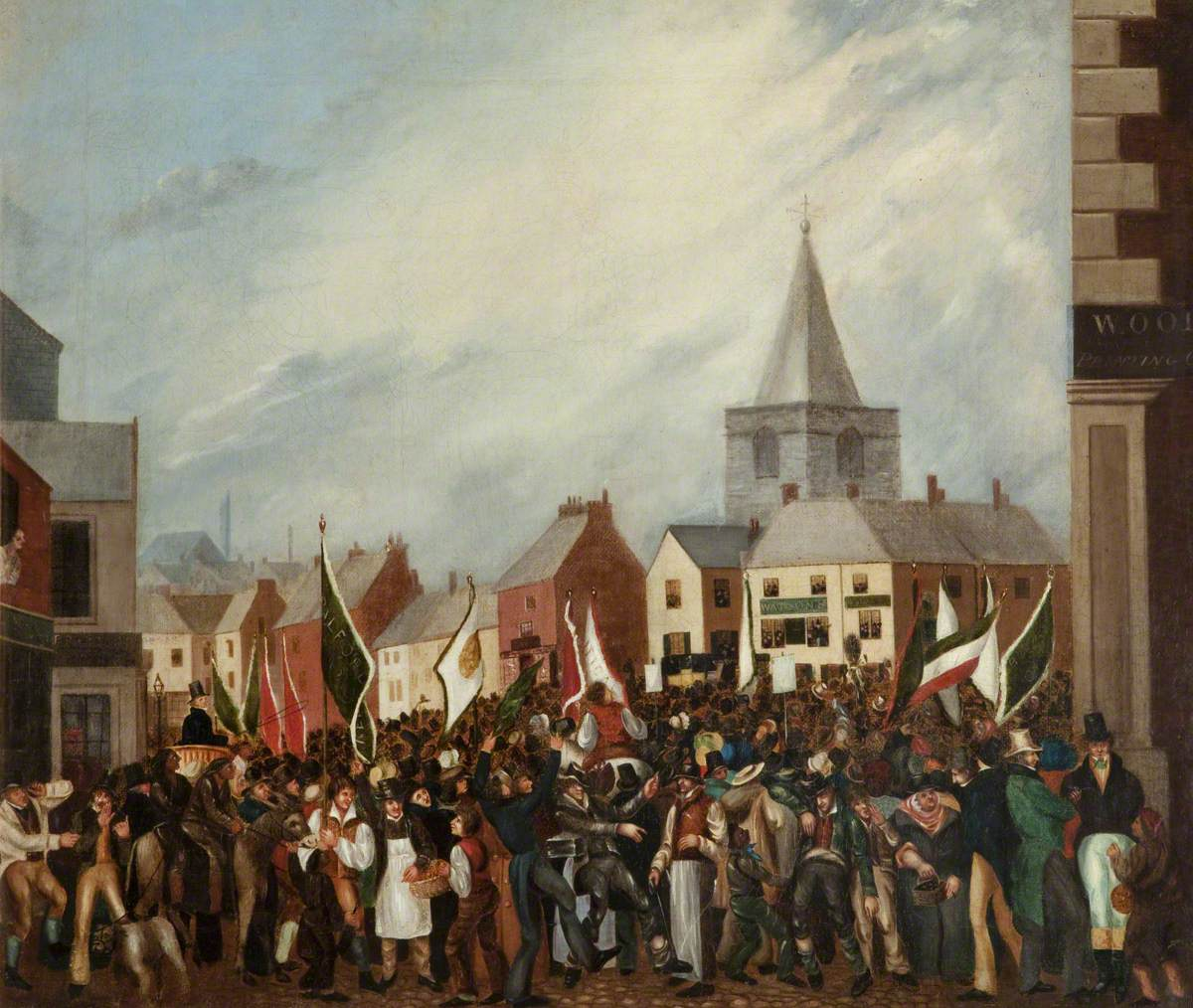
The 1832 Blackburn Election (unknown artist) Blackburn Museum and Art Gallery

Bowring was a hugely popular candidate in Blackburn but at this time the vast majority were unable to vote to show their support, indeed, the census of 1831 showed a population of 27,091 in Blackburn, of which only 627 were eligible to vote. This inevitably led to tension and opponents could use underhand means to sway the election as can be seen in this account from page 14 of the Autobiographical Recollections of Sir John Bowring.

When the Reform Bill was passed, Dr Bowring presented himself for election at Blackburn, but though enthusiastically received by the mass of the people, he was rejected by the electors, his opponents beating him by several votes. On looking back at the electioneering contests of that time, one cannot help wondering at the vehement invective and unsparing abuse which were freely bandied about. Every kind of gibe, jest, satire, and insinuation was brought into play at Blackburn, nor was the hostility to Dr Bowring confined to words, for a large stone was thrown into his bedroom, which passed close to his head. His friends, however, on their side, manifested their regard by presenting his wife with a handsome service of plate.

Dewhurst's support of Bowring put him at odds with one of his famous acquaintances - William Cobbett - who had become friendly with Dewhurst when visiting Blackburn in the winter of 1831-32. Knowing Dewhurst was a supporter of the radical Dr John Bowring in the forthcoming parliamentary election in Blackburn, and being strongly opposed to Bowring (a mutual feeling according to Abram), Cobbett tried to dissuade his friends (and in particular Dewhurst) from supporting Bowring in the forthcoming election. Cobbett and Dewhurst had long shared a passion for flowers and the former had collected a number of them on his visit to Bolton and Blackburn. He rather dramatically claimed that he could no longer look at or smell them without a sense of disgust:

What! and am I doomed to see Mr. DEWHURST, who obligingly got me these very pinks, at Blackburn — am I doomed to see him the advocate of this Bowring, who is actually in the pay of Government, or was so but only the other day, and who, of course, is ready to be so again? A good man, as Mr. Dewhurst when undeceived, will never persevere in the error.

The article in Cobbett's Register was reproduced in Blackburn by the printer T.Rogerson (who had previously reported Dewhurst to the Home Secretary).

Despite Cobbett's entreaty, Dewhurst did indeed 'persevere in the error" of supporting Bowring, and he worked tirelessly (if unsuccessfully) to secure his victory at the election. It shows courage on Dewhurst's part to follow his own path in the face of such a public challenge by a prominent and well-connected man such as Cobbett.

Elections at this time were notoriously rambunctious affairs, sometimes violent and often subject to bribery and coercion. Apparently the authorities were concerned about the possibility of disruption, by making sure a "great number" of special constables had been sworn in to keep the peace and keeping things as calm as possible by exhorting the candidates to ensure:

. .. no ribbons shall be worn by any party and that no parade of music, banners, flags, etc. shall take place. Besides this, the magistrates have very prudently issued an order that all beer shops shall close at eight and all public houses at nine o'clock each evening during the continuance of the election.

Despite these measures, however, the election was marred by violent incidents both before and after the announcement of the winners was made (Blackburn Alfred 17 December 1832):

The populous before the announcement was made had exhibited symptoms of violence and several stones and other missiles were thrown from the field in Ainsworth Street, by which many individuals were slightly wounded and some panes of glass broken, but Dr Bowring quieted them for awhile, by exhorting them to preserve peace and good order. However, whilst the closing proceedings at the hustings were going on, another portion of the population were employed in breaking the windows of the Old Bull Inn, and several severe skirmishes took place between the mob and the special constables; wherein some of the latter were seriously injured. The riot at one time assumed a very alarming appearance, but Dr Bowring coming from the hustings, he addressed the people again from Mr. Clemesha's window and eventually the crowd dispersed without further damage.

The focus of violence was not only on those eligible to vote, but also on the crowd, who could influence the actual voters by intimidation or, for example, boycotting the businesses of those who voted the "wrong way." An early example of this was given in Turner's entry into the contest with an offering of barrels of beer.

Bowring's party decided against employing such tactics but no doubt suffered as a result, especially as Feilden's camp started to adopt the same practice. The Inns of Blackburn had 'scores' of £60 to £200 each and as a result only two of the inn keepers voted for Bowring, especially as his threat of "exclusive dealings" (saying that if a person did not vote for Bowring his business would be ostracised) proved to be less effective.

In such a fashion the election continued for a second day and ended on Thursday 13 December at 2pm. The final results were Feilden 377, Turner 347 and Bowring 334. Feilden and Turner were declared as duly elected. It is almost certain that without the restrictions of voting to only those owning property with a rateable value of at least £10, the Radical Bowring's victory would likely have been assured.

Unfortunately it seems that the town was affected for some time after the polls had closed. Durham reported that:

So ended the first election, but its baneful effect was long felt in the town. The shops of tradesmen who had given their votes of the Conservative candidates were surrounded by large crowds, preventing people from entering. This was to be lamented, as being inconsistent with the professions and principles of the party who clamoured for freedom and an extension of elective franchise.

==== The election of 1835 ====
Feilden and Turner once again came forward for reelection and Bowring was again asked to stand and apparently met with even more support than previously. His supporters tried to follow the tactics of the previous winners by dealing in a little "heavy wet" (offering drink) but couldn't compete with their opponents who could "run up shots for drink for sums of "£20 to £90 in a few hours".

The show of hands at the nomination stage of the proceedings indicated a majority for Bowring and Turner and the friends of Bowring (including Dewhurst) were confident that this time he would secure one of Blackburn's two parliamentary seats.

In the 'Recollections of Blackburn and Its Neighbourhood' published as a series by the Preston Chronicle in 1877-1878, it was reported that an unbridgeable divide was caused between George Dewhurst and William Feilden. The former put a number of difficult questions to the latter such as "Will you vote for the total and unconditional repeal of the Corn Laws?" or "Will you vote for abolishing the duties on sugar?" Apparently a number of such questions were posed, each receiving a reply "in the strain of a bulldog": "Never". When the same questions were put to Dr Bowring the opposite response "Always" was given. Dewhurst summarised the responses as "It's 'always' Bowring, Feilden 'never', don't forget that my lads".

The advice seemed to have been acted upon as, following the exchange, Feilden was known as 'Old Sour pie', a sobriquet he carried for the rest of his life. The matter was made worse when it became known that Feilden was the owner of a sugar plantation. Crowds would follow him around the streets "hooting, yelling, and groaning, or calling out 'Old Sour Pie'". One can imagine why the matter caused some enmity between Feilden and Dewhurst and diminished the former's popularity at the poll.

The steps the candidates took to secure victory were astonishing, with Durham reporting that "Doubtful voters were fetched the night before the poll, and duly housed or "bottled" by each party". Rioting again took place and the polling in a couple of booths had to be closed until the following day.

Despite the early optimism of Bowring's supporters, it was clear by the third day that Turner (though a professed reformer) had helped Feilden win the poll. The windows of the Bull Hotel were broken and the house partially gutted. It was later admitted by Turner that Feilden had met with him in the night following the closure of the poll due to rioting. Feilden reminded Turner of the help he had given him in 1832 to get elected and asked for the same favour.

Notwithstanding the best efforts of Dewhurst, Bowring was again defeated, this time by 14 votes. Violence broke out again and could have been much worse if it had not been for the fact that Dr Bowring had found a seat in Kilmarnock, Scotland, where he served until the following year and then again in Bolton from 1847. He later took up the Governorship of Hong Kong.

The disappointment of the inhabitants was reflected in their praise for Bowring:

A handsome service of plate was voted by the inhabitants of Blackburn and presented to Dr. Bowring, with an inscription recording their approval of, and gratitude for, the purity with which the memorable contests had been conducted, while a penny subscription among the poor provided a splendid specimen of a Lancaster pie, which for many weeks graced, un-exhausted, the table of the recipient.

It is a mark of the enthusiasm for Bowring that on his way back to London following his parliamentary victory at Kilmarnock:

A public procession was given to him in Blackburn; he was met on the Preston New Road with music, banners, &c., and duly escorted into the town; a public dinner was given to him in the Theatre.

==== The election of 1837 ====
This was the first election conducted under new regulations requiring polling to be completed in a single day.

The Liberals (supported by Dewhurst) put John Benjamin Smith from Manchester into the running. He was a supporter of Free Trade. Feilden and Turner stood again but Smith and Turner emerged as the favoured candidates at the initial show of hands. Despite this, Feilden demanded a ballot and Smith then withdrew, possibly as he was aware of the underhand tactics that Feilden might employ to win the election.

The final result was William Turner (432), William Feilden (316), and John Benjamin Smith (9).

George Dewhurst organised a Parliamentary Petition against the result and was described as a "laughing stock" by the Blackburn Standard as a result. His principal allegation was that Feilden used "corrupt and unlawful means" to be elected by "treating and promising money". The petition was rejected and the results upheld.

==== The Election of 1841 ====
Abram reports that in the 1841 election Dewhurst was not very active as he did not care for William Turner personally. In addition, as he grew older and reforms continued, Dewhurst may have felt that his work on parliamentary reform could be safely left in the hands of others (although he still worked hard in the day-to-day reform of his home town):

His Radicalism did not fail with the continued demand upon it, but, like many men, his views were chastened somewhat as he advanced in years, and, as reforms progressed, he was perhaps satisfied that Britons could secure all the rights and liberties they wanted without transforming their old political system. Free speech, for which he had battled and borne the harshest penalties of the law, he saw conceded and enjoyed without stint.

The final result of the election was William Feilden (441), John Hornby (427), and William Turner (426). According to Bean:

Turner petitioned (September 8th), against the return of Hornby on account of the non-qualification of voters, of votes rejected which were duly qualified and which were offered for the petitioner, and men not on the register who impersonated others and voted for Hornby; and also on account of bribery, treating, and corruption; and the petitioner prayed that Hornby's name might be erased from the return, and that his be inserted, or else that the return of Hornby be declared null and void. The committee declared (April 28th, 1842), that Hornby was duly elected. The petition was abandoned after a scrutiny.

The election was marred by considerable violence including an attack by a mob on the Bull Hotel, where Feilden was staying, causing extensive damage. Durham records Feilden's inventive means of escaping from the attack: "Mr Feilden, in the disguise of a female, was got over a wall, and escaped further violence by going to the Legs of Man Inn". In the end the military needed to be called in to stop the violence.

Miller reports that "within three months of the end of the poll Mr Turner was dead, his death, 'according to popular belief', 'accelerated by disappointment'." Miller writes that Turner was always popular with the working classes and reports that he was regarded as kind and generous.

==== The election of 1847 ====
Feilden decided not to stand. John Hornby stood again for the Conservatives. The Liberals decided to go with James Pilkington (a Liberal and Free-trader) and William Hargreaves. The extreme Radicals weren't consulted about the choice of candidate and brought out W. P. Roberts of Manchester.

Hornby and Pilkington won, but Durham reports that there was no great excitement in the town for the election.

It is not known how Dewhurst voted in this election.

==== The election of 1852 ====
Hornby and Pilkington offered themselves for re-election and it seemed, according to Durham, that they might both be returned to Parliament without a contest. This was prevented when the cotton manufacturer William Eccles came forward as a Liberal conservative (he was supported by the Blackburn Standard and Preston Chronicle but opposed by the radical Preston Guardian). Eccles had practised law for 20 years and had also been the chairman of the Blackburn Anti-Corn Law Association between the years 1841-46.

Durham points out that for the first time Blackburn was represented by two reformers as Eccles tended to vote with the liberals. In this election, Dewhurst (still living at Queen Street) voted for both Mr Pilkington and Mr Eccles. This was unsurprising as Dewhurst shared Eccles's opposition to the Corn Laws and was almost certainly sympathetic to the Anti-Corn Law Association that Eccles chaired.

The final result was James Pilkington (846), William Eccles (580) and John Hornby (509).

Three electors successfully petitioned against the return of Eccles in the election alleging that there was "gross, extensive, and systematic bribery and treating" by his friends and supporters. A further election was consequently held in 1853.

==== The election of 1853 ====
The 1853 election was called only as a result of the successful petition against William Eccles in the previous year's election. It was an unpleasant and violent affair, described by Durham as "the severest contest ever known in Blackburn since its enfranchisement". Durham also indicated that matters were made worse because the liberals were so incensed by how Eccles had been treated the year before.

Durham offers further details of the unrest:

Each party after the nomination had bands of armed marauders parading the various streets during the night. Voters were kidnapped from their dwellings, drugged, "bottled," and made safe; and in some cases extreme violence was used. Public houses were gutted, and windows smashed. The military were sent for from Preston, and they stopped in the town for several days to preserve the peace. The damage did not end with the election and the windows of several of the voters were smashed after the soldiers left the town. For this rioting several parties were indicted and some imprisoned.

In the end, Joseph Feilden (Liberal) and William Hornby (Conservative) were elected by 631 and 574 votes respectively.

According to Bean, two electors petitioned against the return of Feilden arguing that he was not qualified as he had insufficient estate. Two other electors also accused him of bribery and corruption, threats and intimidation and offering money, gifts and rewards. They also said that the threat of violence aimed at the friends of Hornby, made them "terrified and forced to vote for Feilden." In addition Feilden was also accused of using the military to his own ends. The petition was later withdrawn.

It is not known how George Dewhurst voted in this election.

==== The election of 1857 ====
The election of 1857 took place on 27 March, approximately four months before Dewhurst's death. It is not known whether he voted and, if so, whom he voted for.

The candidates were James Pilkington (Liberal) and William Henry Hornby (Conservative) and they were returned without a contest as Mr Jonathan Peel retired before the election.

=== The Improvement Commission ===
Following the election Dewhurst spent years serving on the town's Improvement Commission, often in the role of chairman. His work provides a fascinating glimpse into the unglamorous but wholly necessary business of civic improvement. In some ways the smaller, quieter battles of the committee were just as important to improving the lot of his fellow citizens as his struggles of yesteryear. The Blackburn Standard of 12 August 1846 reported on the regular Friday meeting of the Commissioners in the Sessions Room in Blackburn. George Dewhurst was in the chair and that single meeting covered:

- The construction of the new Market House including the costs involved.
- Repairing streets and cleaning bye-ways (where Dewhurst brought attention to the "filthy nuisance" of the George and Dragon yard where horses were boiled up and placed in tubs causing an intolerable stench)
- In his role as chairman, Dewhurst brought the commission's attention to the fact that the Improvement Act intended that a street was defined not only as a thoroughfare but also a court, alley, lane or passage and that these areas were to be cleaned as well. When this was challenged Dewhurst pointed out that "...the state of the back places were disgraceful. The persons residing there paid their rates like other people, and yet they were, in this respect, together neglected. The scavengers ought to go into all these back streets and places."
- The removal of pigsties.
- What Dewhurst considered the greatest nuisance of all, the River Blakewater, and in particular the "noxious exhalations continually rising from its bed." A lengthy and detailed discussion followed.
- Approving the purchase of land.
- The appointment of police constables.
- The post of weighing machine keeper.

Dewhurst dutifully continued his work on Blackburn's Improvement Commission until the town's incorporation in 1851. The passion of his youth that led to his imprisonment may have become more measured, but his commitment to those he felt compelled to serve remained as strong as ever.

=== Election to the first town council ===
Dewhurst was a member of Blackburn's Improvement Commissioners for many years before the town was incorporated and in 1851 was elected to the first Town Council. He was to represent the ward of St Pauls until he died in 1857.

His appeal to voters to be their representative was both humble and effective:

Gentlemen,

At the meeting held in your Ward, on Monday last, in the Assembly Room, Heaton-street, you were pleased to nominate me as one of your intended Councillors. For such an honour I sincerely thank you. I have laboured in the Public cause for many years, and have not been an inactive inhabitant of my native Town: of the results you are able to judge.

I submit to you my past conduct, not as a boast, but as a testimonial of my claim for your suffrages.

The incorporation of your Borough has given to all Householders the right of self-government, and with you rests the responsibility of appointing governors of the Town. I have no collegiate education to recommend myself to your notice; I am self-taught and plain; and, if my past labours give you any assurance of my future conduct, you will, I anticipate, place me in a situation where I can be more useful than I have hitherto been.

Gentlemen, I do not intend to canvass the Ward for Votes, but it is out of no disrespect to you that I have come to this conclusion. I believe the duties between the Representative and the Represented are reciprocal; consequently, no unnecessary burdens should be laid on your Representatives.

I have the honour to be, Gentlemen,

Your Servant,

— George Dewhurst, Queen Street, October 23rd, 1851.

== Political, social and economic views ==
=== Religion ===
Although baptised and married in the Church of England, George Dewhurst was a self-confessed dissenter of the Unitarian tradition (at least in 1832, it is possible that his views changed in later life).

=== Women's suffrage ===
One might be forgiven for thinking that the demand for women’s suffrage began with Emmeline Pankhurst and the formation of the Suffragette movement in the early 20th century. However, as early as the 18th century Mary Wollstonecraft had argued for women to share the same political rights as men. Agitation to obtain voting rights for women also figured in the reform movement in the first half of the 19th century alongside the demand for the extension of the vote for men. During this time a number of female reform societies were set up, with the first being established in June 1819 in Dewhurst’s home town of Blackburn. Radical meetings also began to encourage women to vote with men for or against resolutions by a show of hand, adding support to the notion that women as well as men had the right to be represented.

In 1832 Henry Hunt (a friend of George Dewhurst) presented a petition to parliament on behalf of a Yorkshire woman from Leeds named Mary Smith. Smith’s petition argued two primary points: one that as she paid taxes she should not be excluded from the election of a representative that would be responsible for spending them and secondly, as she was subject to the punishments of the law (not excepting execution) she ought to have a voice in making them. Smith also made the point that in the latter case it seemed unfair that both judges and jurors were all male. The petition was met with ridicule as can be seen in the response of Sir Frederick Trench who argued that if a jury made up half of males and half females were locked up together “… as now often happened with juries. This might lead to rather queer predicaments”.

It might be assumed that Dewhurst, with his early connection with the radical movement and his friendship with Hunt, would have been prepared for and sympathetic to the cause of women’s suffrage. This doesn’t seem to have been the case as Lewis’s discovery of a speech made by Dewhurst and recorded in the Bolton Chronicle in February 1831 makes clear:

In the marriage vow the woman gave up her rights to her husband; and he from that time became responsible for their exercise (hear). If it [the vote] were extended to females, it might create disturbance in many families, as the husband and wife might be at variance as to the candidate whom they ought to support.

(Laughter.) He was aware that women were as capable of judging either in political or religious matters as men; and in most matters they were far superior to them, being more virtuous, more sober, and more persevering than men. He thought, however, that it would be quite sufficient if the franchise were extended to men.

== Death and burial ==
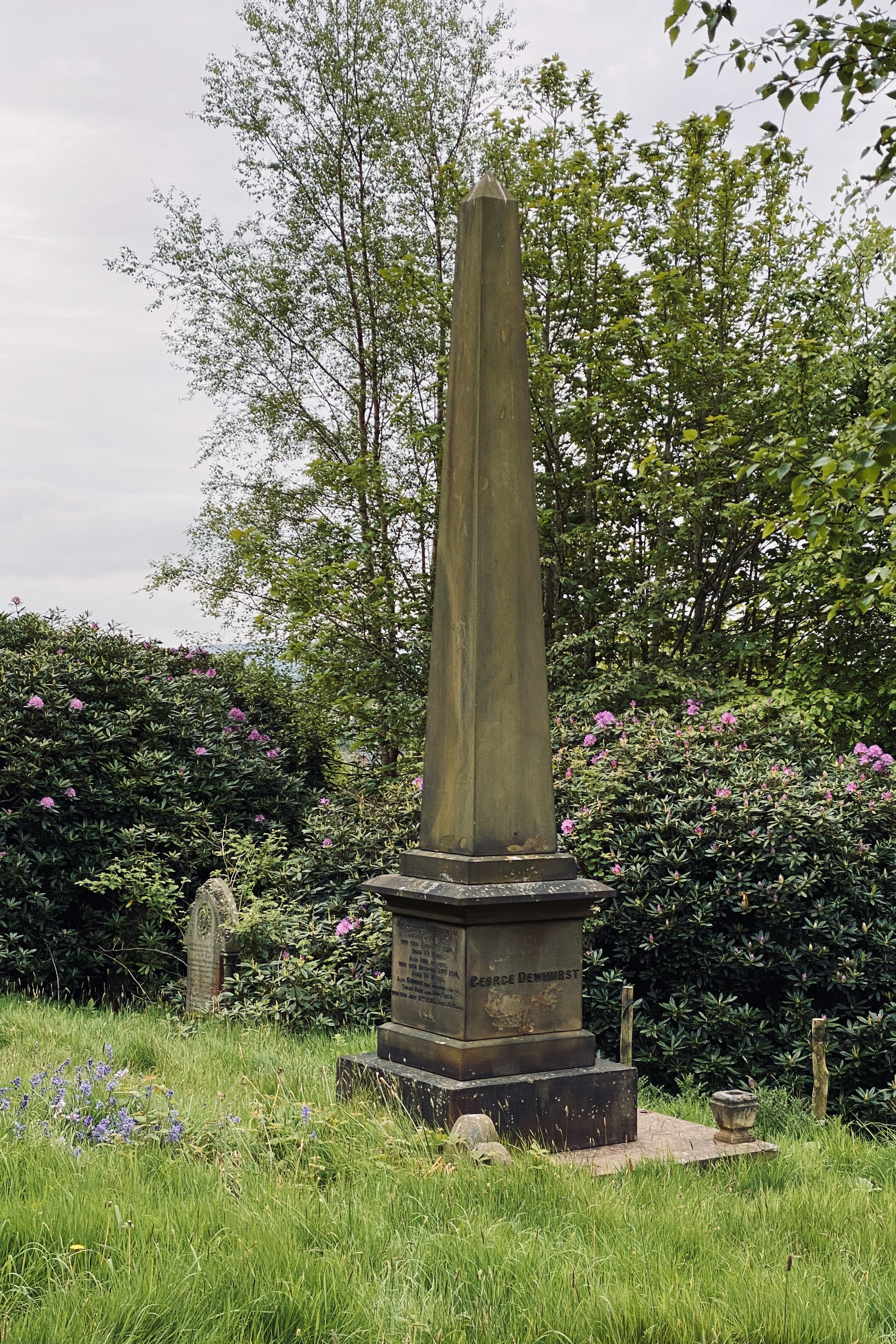
George Dewhurst's memorial in Blackburn Cemetery

George Dewhurst died at his home on Queen Street on the 14th of August 1857 of kidney disease and was buried five days later at Blackburn Cemetery. He was still a Councillor of the town on the day of his death.

Dewhurst's contribution to the cause of reform couldn't have been more clearly articulated than in a letter from Mr John Sparrow that was read out at a meeting held at the White Bull Inn in Blackburn in 1857. The meeting was held to consider the possibility of erecting a memorial to Dewhurst and was chaired by Mr Alderman Rutherford. Mr Sparrow was unable to attend as "magisterial matters prevented his attendance" but his letter expressed his view that no man had "laboured more earnestly" than Dewhurst "during the whole of his life in the cause of reform and social progress".

The resolution adopted by the meeting was glowing in its praise:

That the unpaid services of the late George Dewhurst in battling for the free press, the amendment of the representation of people, the abolition of all ecclesiastical persecutions and imposts, his consistent advocacy of those measures which he conceived most essential for the local good government of his native town, together with his laudable and oftentimes successful efforts to assist or elevate suffering humanity, during a period of forty years, entitle him to the earnest gratitude of posterity; and this meeting hereby pledges itself to use its utmost endeavours to secure that erection of tablet of monument, bearing a suitable inscription, in order to perpetuate his memory and incite others to imitate his example.

The meeting was concluded with a "display of cordial and enthusiastic feeling", and a vote of thanks to the chairman.

Unsurprisingly the people of Blackburn went on to commission a monument to Dewhurst at the cemetery and in April 1858 the Blackburn Standard reported that it had been erected. It was the first public monument in the cemetery at that time, completed by the builder John Hacking and stood about 17 feet in height. It was reported that when first erected the monument was "conspicuous from a considerable distance".

The monument is inscribed with the following:

Sacred to the Memory of George Dewhurst, Who was a Member of the Council of the Borough of Blackburn from the time of its incorporation. He departed this life August 14th, A.D., 1857. Aged 67 Years

Erected by his Friends and Fellow-townsmen, as a mark of respect for his private worth and consistent support of the great principles of Political and Social Reform.

As a man he was conscientious and earnest;

As a citizen, patriotic;

As a friend, generous and sincere.

== Legacy and recognition ==
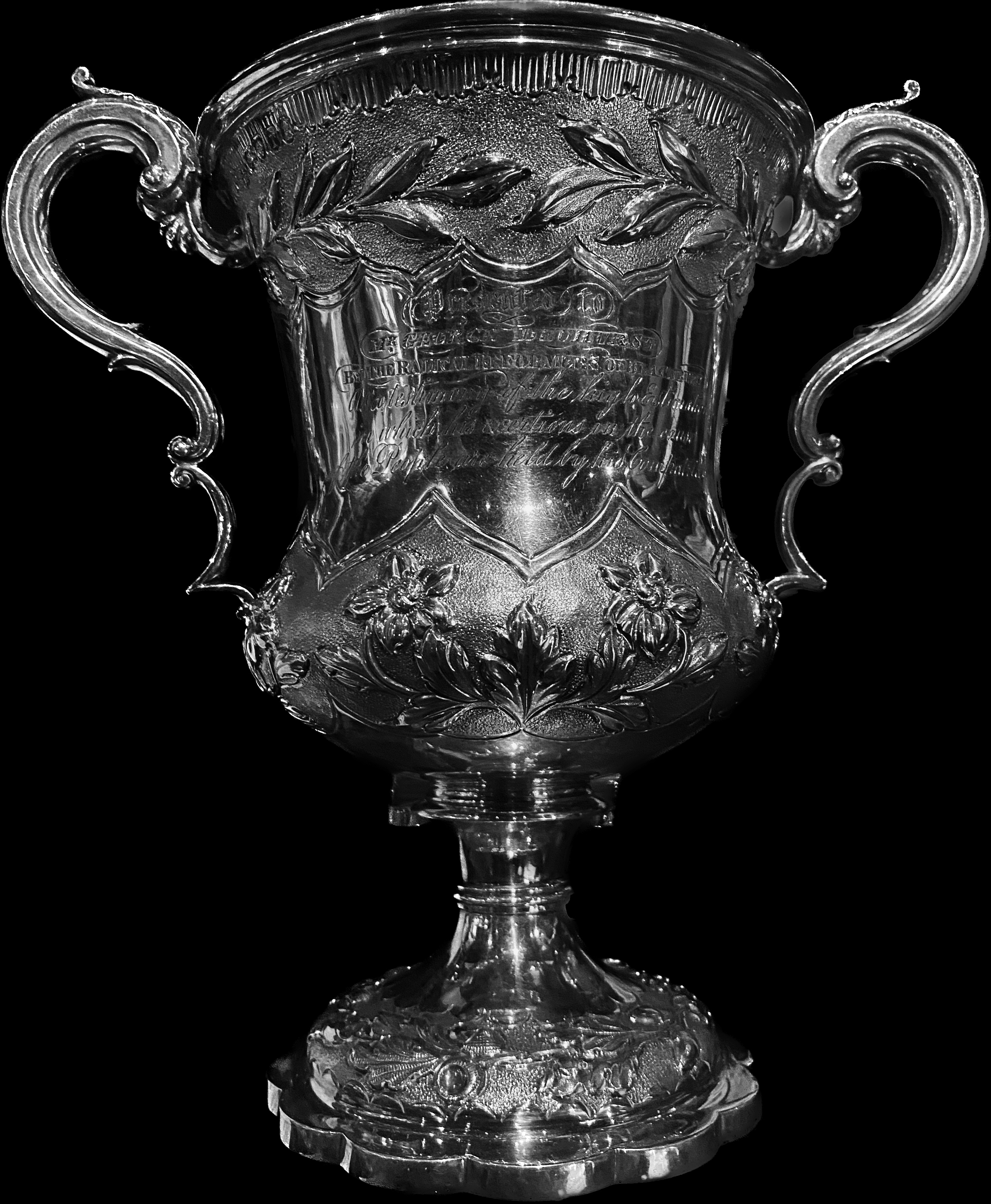
The silver cup presented to George Dewhurst by fellow radical reformers.

George Dewhurst's contribution to the cause of reform was clearly recognised before and shortly after the time of his death. His memorial in Blackburn Cemetery has already been mentioned, but he also received a fine silver cup from fellow Radical reformers with the inscription:

"Presented to Mr. George Dewhurst by the Radical Reformers of Blackburn, as a testimony of the high estimation in which his exertions in the cause of the People are held by his compatriots. The People united are omnipotent."

The cup can currently be seen in Blackburn Museum.

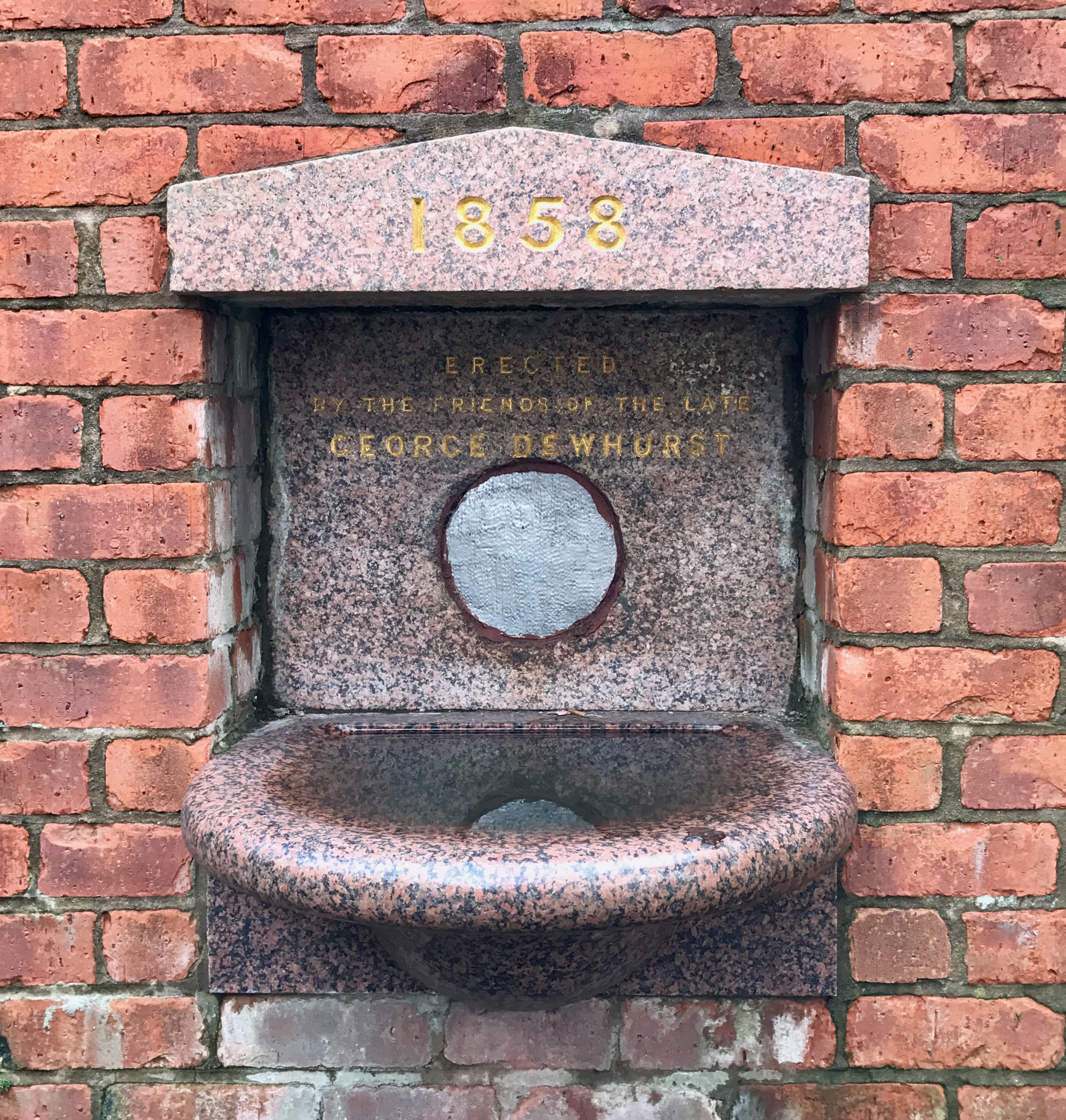
Old Drinking Fountain memorial for George Dewhurst 1858. Fleming Square, Blackburn.

Shortly after Dewhurst's death a small drinking fountain made of Peterhead granite was inserted in the west wall of the market house with the inscription "1858. Erected by the friends of the late George Dewhurst". It was later moved beneath Darwen Street railway bridge and then (following the prompting of Margery Woods, one of Dewhurst's descendants) to Fleming Square.

Despite the acclaim that George Dewhurst enjoyed during his lifetime as "one of Blackburn's most remarkable sons", recognition of the importance of his role faded from memory over the decades that followed his death. More recently this recognition has been revitalised by the enthusiasm of those with a passion for local and family history. An online supporters group has been set up and has been influential in bringing Dewhurst's role to much greater prominence. The aforementioned silver cup was successfully acquired through crowdfunding, and members share memories of George Dewhurst and his ancestors and act to preserve his memory.

Recently Blackburn Museum and Art Gallery held a George Dewhurst day and Dewhurst descendants have also announced that they have put in an application to have a road named after George Dewhurst which has now been put into effect.

An animation was created in celebration of George Dewhurst by the BA (Hons) student Bee Joy (The Radical - Animation by Bee Joy on YouTube)
