= Robert Hope Moncrieff Aitken =

Victoria Cross recipient

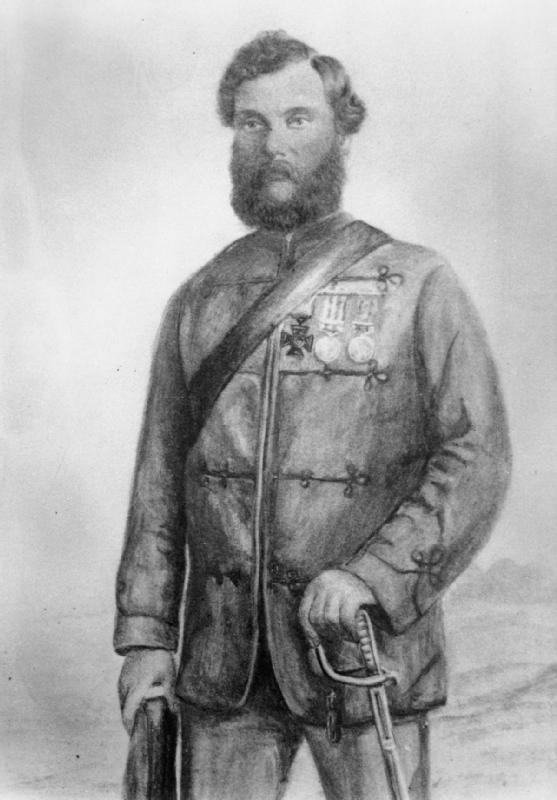
- Born: 6 February 1826; Cupar, Fife, Scotland
- Died: 18 September 1887 (aged 61); St Andrews, Fife, Scotland
- Burial place: Eastern Cemetery, St Andrews
- Military career
- Allegiance: British India; East India Company
- Branch: Bengal Army
- Rank: Colonel
- Conflicts: Second Anglo-Sikh War; Indian Mutiny
- Awards: Victoria Cross; Order of the Bath

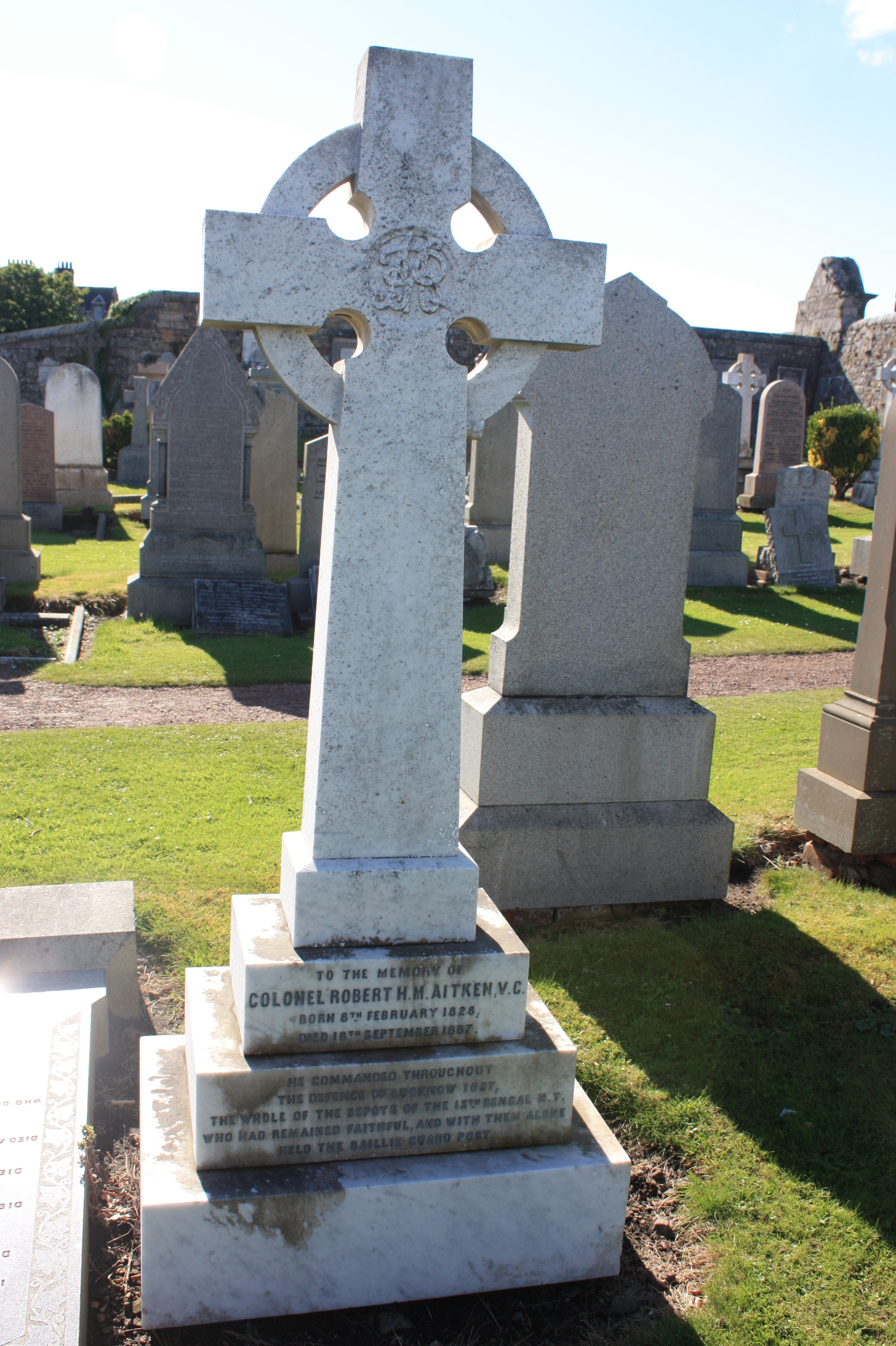
The grave of Col Robert H M Aitken, Eastern Cemetery, St Andrews

Colonel Robert Hope Moncrieff Aitken VC CB (8 February 1826 – 18 September 1887) was a Scottish recipient of the Victoria Cross, the highest and most prestigious award for gallantry in the face of the enemy that can be awarded to British and Commonwealth forces.

== Details of Nomination ==
He was 31 years old, and a lieutenant in the 13th Bengal Native Infantry, Bengal Army during the Indian Mutiny when the following deeds took place for which he was awarded the VC:

For various acts of gallantry performed during the defence of the Residency of Lucknow, from the 30th of June to the 22nd of November, 1857.

1. On three different occasions, Lieutenant Aitken went into the garden under the enemy's loopholes in the "Captain's Bazaar". On two of these occasions, he brought out a number of bullocks which had been left in the garden;— subsequently, on the 3rd of July, the enemy having set fire to the Bhoosa Stock in the garden, and it being apprehended that the fire would reach the Powder Magazine which had been left there, Lieutenant Aitken, accompanied by other Officers, went into the garden, and cut down all the tents which might have communicated the fire to the powder. This was done, close to the enemy's, loopholes. Under a bright light from the flames. It was a most dangerous service.
2. On the night of the 20 August, the Enemy, having set fire to the Baillie Guard Gate, Lieutenant Aitken was the first man in the gateway, and, assisted by some sepoys and a water-carrier of his Regiment, he partially opened the gate under a-heavy, fire of musketry, and, having removed the burning wood and straw, saved the gate.
3. On the evening of the 25 September, this Officer led on twelve sepoys of his Regiment, for the purpose of attacking two guns opposite the gate referred to, in order to prevent their being turned-on the late Major-General Havelock's second column. Having captured them, he attacked and took the Teree Kotee, with a small force.
4. On the morning of the 26 September, with a small party of his Regiment, he assaulted and captured the barricaded gateway of the Furreed Buksh Palace, and the Palace itself. On this occasion, he sprang up against a small wicket gate on the right and prevented the enemy from shutting it, until, with assistance, it was forced open, and the assaulting party were thus enabled to rush in. The complete success of the attack was solely owing to this Officer's distinguished bravery.

5. In a subsequent sortie on 29 September, Lieutenant Aitken volunteered to take a gun which still continued firing, taking with him four soldiers through the houses and lanes to the gun. The enemy fired on this party from the houses, but they held their ground, until a stronger party coming up, the gun was upset from its carriage, and taken into the Residency. Another gun was subsequently taken.

== Later life ==
In later life he achieved the rank of colonel.

He died in 1887 and is buried in the Eastern Cemetery at St Andrews on the upper terrace.

== Family ==
Robert was the son of John Aitken and Jane Christie, of Cupar, Fife, Scotland. He came from a long line of army personnel. His cousin Robert Digby-Jones also received the Victoria Cross (posthumously) for actions at Ladysmith in 1900.

== Legacy ==
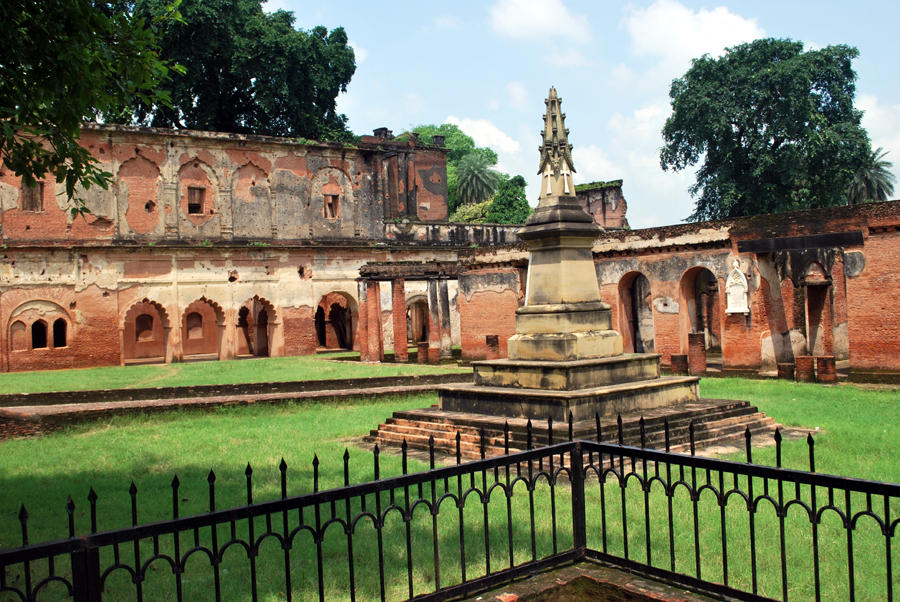
The memorial in Lucknow

His Victoria Cross is now part of the collections at the National Army Museum (Chelsea, England). He is unique in that the decoration ceremony took place at the same location, the Residency at Lucknow, nearly at the exact spot where several of his V.C. actions had occurred. However, he did not receive the actual medal on this occasion, as it had been mislaid.

A memorial was erected at the Residency in Lucknow. It reads:

This monument is erected to the memory of Colonel Robert Hope Moncrieff Aitken VC Bengal Staff Corps and formerly of the 13th Regt Bengal Infantry, by some of his surviving comrades and other friends in token of their appreciation of his sterling worth as a man, and of the splendid gallantry and chivalrous devotion which he displayed as a soldier in command of this post, which he held with the faithful and loyal remnant of the Regiment to which he belonged throughout the defence of the Residency of Lucknow.

== Publications ==
- Monuments To Courage (David Harvey, 1999)
- The Register of the Victoria Cross (This England, 1997)
- Scotland's Forgotten Valour (Graham Ross, 1995)
