= Blackburn Cemetery =

Cemetery in England

Coordinates: 53°46′00″N 2°28′14″W

Blackburn Cemetery, sometimes known as Blackburn Old Cemetery, is a public cemetery in the town of Blackburn, Lancashire, which lies on Whalley New Road with views over the town. It opened on 1 July 1857.

== Noteworthy interments ==
- James Dixon (1855–1936) – philanthropist, known as "The Blackburn Samaritan", he founded the Ragged School and the orphanage at Wilpshire
- Jack Hunter (1851-1903) - footballer)
- Frederick Kempster, the "English Giant" or "Blackburn Giant" (1889–1918) – over 7 feet tall and worked in showbusiness as a "giant"
- Elizabeth Anne Lewis (1849–1924) – celebrated as the "Temperance Queen" or "Drunkard's Friend"
- John Lewis (1855–1926) – football referee and founder of Blackburn Rovers
- James Pitts (1877–1955) – Victoria Cross recipient, a hero of the Siege of Ladysmith in the Boer War
- Fergus Suter (1857–1916) – Arguably the first recognised professional footballer
- Thomas Thwaites (c. 1809–1871) – owner of Thwaites Brewery
- George Dewhurst (1789-1857), Radical, Reformer and Reedmaker. "One of Blackburn's most remarkable sons".
- June Anne Devaney (1944-1948) – three-year-old victim of murder, which resulted in the first-ever mass fingerprinting operation in history

The cemetery contains the war graves of 269 Commonwealth service personnel from both World Wars which are scattered throughout the cemetery. After the First World War the Commonwealth War Graves Commission erected a Cross of Sacrifice opposite the main entrance in honour of those buried here.
