= Robert Scott (VC) =

Recipient of the Victoria Cross (1874–1961)

Robert Scott VC
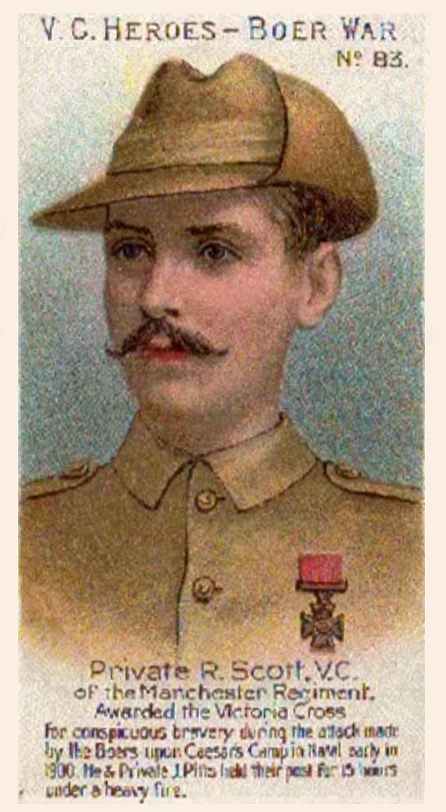
- Scott depicted on a cigarette card
- Born: 4 June 1874; Haslingden, Lancashire, England, UK
- Died: 21 February 1961 (aged 86); Downpatrick, Northern Ireland, UK
- Burial place: Christ Church Cemetery, Kilkeel
- Military career
- Allegiance: United Kingdom
- Branch: British Army; Royal Air Force
- Service years: 1895–1923
- Rank: Regimental Quartermaster Sergeant
- Units: Manchester Regiment
- Conflicts: Second Boer War; World War I; World War II
- Awards: Victoria Cross
- Other work: Royal Ulster Constabulary officer

Robert Scott (4 June 1874 – 21 February 1961), was an English recipient of the Victoria Cross, the highest and most prestigious award for gallantry in the face of the enemy that can be awarded to British and Commonwealth forces.

== Details ==
Born in Haslingden, Lancashire, Scott worked in a cotton mill in Haslingden until 1895 when he joined the Manchester Regiment, going with his regiment to South Africa after the outbreak of the Boer War.

He was a 25-year-old private in the 1st Battalion, Manchester Regiment, British Army, during the Second Boer War when the following deed took place in Natal for which he and Private James Pitts were awarded the VC:

During the attack on Caesar's Camp, in Natal, on the 6th January, 1900, these two men occupied a sangar, on the left of which all our men had been shot down and their positions occupied by Boers, and held their post for fifteen hours without food or water, all the time under an extremely heavy fire, keeping up their fire and a smart look-out though the Boers occupied some sangars on their immediate left rear. Private Scott was wounded.

He was invested with his VC by Lord Kitchener on 8 June 1902 at Pretoria, South Africa.

Still in the army during the First World War, Scott served as orderly sergeant at Ashton Barracks, Lancashire. After retiring in 1923, he worked with the Ulster Special Constabulary in Newtownards, Northern Ireland. He enlisted in the Royal Air Force in 1939 and undertook embarkation duties at Southampton Docks during Second World War. After the war he worked as a civil servant.

Scott died on 21 February 1961 aged 86 at Downpatrick, Co Down, and is buried at Christchurch Cemetery, Kilkeel, Co Down.

There are commemorative plaques to Scott on the house where he lived as a boy in Peel Street, Haslingden, and in Kilkeel.

== The medal ==
His Victoria Cross is displayed at the Museum of the Manchester Regiment, Ashton-under-Lyne, England.

== Bibliography ==
- Irish Winners of the Victoria Cross (Richard Doherty & David Truesdale, 2000)
- Monuments to Courage (David Harvey, 1999)
- The Register of the Victoria Cross (This England, 1997)
- Victoria Crosses of the Anglo-Boer War (Ian Uys, 2000)
