= William John House =

Recipient of the Victoria Cross (1879–1912)

William John House VC
- Born: 7 October 1879; Thatcham, Berkshire, England
- Died: 28 February 1912 (aged 32); Dover, Kent, England
- Burial place: St James's Cemetery, Dover, Kent, England
- Military career
- Allegiance: United Kingdom
- Branch: British Army
- Service years: 1896–1912
- Rank: Lance Corporal
- Units: Royal Berkshire Regiment
- Conflicts: Second Boer War
- Awards: Victoria Cross

Lance Corporal William John House VC (7 October 1879 − 28 February 1912) was a British Army soldier and an English recipient of the Victoria Cross (VC), the highest award for gallantry in the face of the enemy that can be awarded to British and Commonwealth forces.

== Background ==
House was born in Thatcham, near Newbury in Berkshire, on 7 October 1879, the son of Thomas House and his wife, Sally Owen, of Cold Ash adjoining that town.

== Details ==
House was 20 years old, and a private in the 2nd Battalion, The Royal Berkshire Regiment (Princess Charlotte of Wales's), British Army during the Second Boer War when the following deed took place at Mosilikatse Nek, South Africa, for which he was awarded the VC.

During the attack on Mosilikatse Nek, on 2nd August, 1900, when a Sergeant, who had gone forward to reconnoitre, was wounded, Private House rushed out from cover (though cautioned not to do so, as the fire from the enemy was very hot), picked up the wounded Sergeant, and endeavoured to bring him into shelter, in doing which Private House was himself severely wounded. He, however, warned his comrades not to come to his assistance, the fire being so severe.

== Further information ==
He later achieved the rank of lance corporal. House died on 28 February 1912 whilst cleaning his rifle in an apparent accident.

== The medal ==
The medal is displayed at The Royal Gloucestershire, Berkshire and Wiltshire Regiment Museum, Salisbury, Wiltshire, England

== Bibliography ==
- Irish Winners of the Victoria Cross (Richard Doherty & David Truesdale, 2000)
- Monuments to Courage (David Harvey, 1999)
- The Register of the Victoria Cross (This England, 1997)
- Victoria Crosses of the Anglo-Boer War (Ian Uys, 2000)
- Ingleton, Roy (2011). Kent VCs. Pen and Sword Books. ISBN 978-1848844094.
