= William Robertson (VC) =

Scottish Boer War soldier (1865–1949)

Lieutenant Colonel William Robertson VC CBE
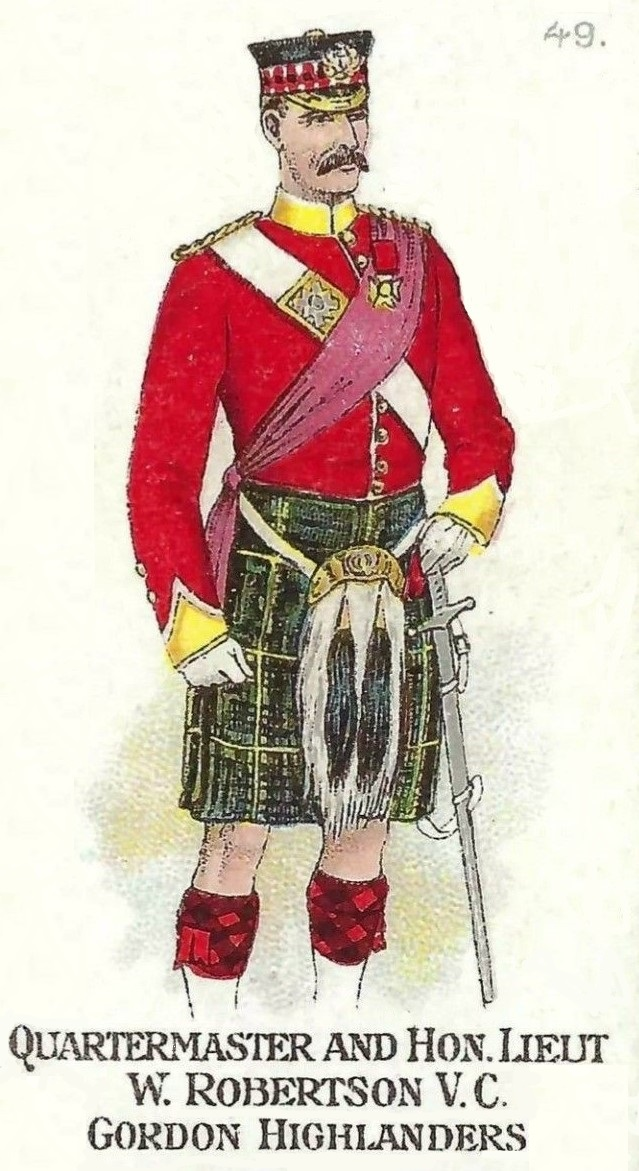
- Robertson on a cigarette card
- Born: 27 February 1865; Dumfries, Scotland
- Died: 6 December 1949 (aged 84); Edinburgh, Scotland
- Burial place: Portobello Cemetery
- Military career
- Allegiance: United Kingdom
- Branch: British Army
- Service years: 1884–1920
- Rank: Lieutenant Colonel
- Units: The Gordon Highlanders
- Conflicts: Second Boer War; World War I
- Awards: Victoria Cross; Commander of the Most Excellent Order of the British Empire

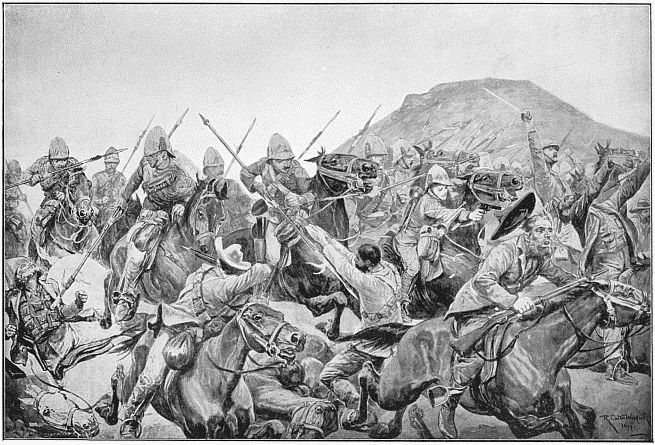
Battle of Elandslaagte

Lieutenant Colonel William Robertson (27 February 1865 – 6 December 1949) was a Scottish recipient of the Victoria Cross, the highest and most prestigious award for gallantry in the face of the enemy that can be awarded to British and Commonwealth forces.

== Details ==
Robertson was 34 years old, and a sergeant-major in the 2nd Battalion, The Gordon Highlanders, British Army, during the Second Boer War when the following action took place at the Battle of Elandslaagte for which he was awarded the VC.

At the Battle of Elandslaagte, on the 21st October, 1899, during the final advance on the enemy's position, this Warrant Officer led each successive rush, exposing himself fearlessly to the enemy's artillery and rifle fire to encourage the men. After the main position had been captured, he led a small party to seize the Boer camp. Though exposed to a deadly cross-fire from the enemy's rifles, he gallantly held on to the position captured, and continued to encourage the men until he was dangerously wounded in two places.

== Further information ==
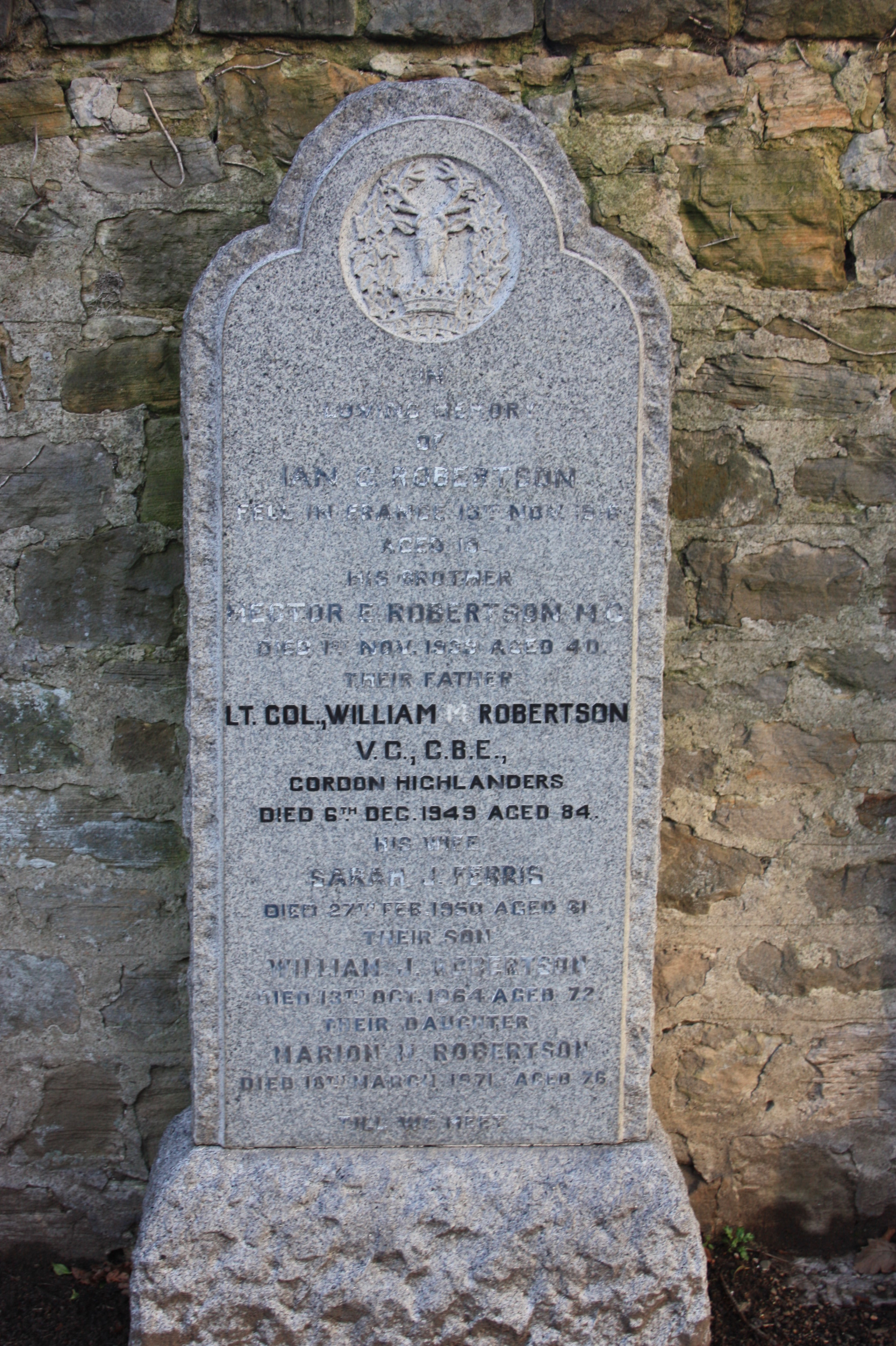
Grave of Lt Col William Robertson VC, Portobello Cemetery, Edinburgh

Robertson was later commissioned into the Gordon Highlanders as a quartermaster with the rank of lieutenant, becoming a recruiting officer in 1907. In 1911 he is listed as "William Robertson VC", recruiting officer, living at 21 Lee Crescent in Portobello, Edinburgh. He was promoted captain in May 1910, major in May 1915, and lieutenant colonel in August 1917.

In January 1918 he was made an Officer of the Order of the British Empire for his service as a recruiting officer in Edinburgh, retiring in March 1920. After retirement he became honorary treasurer of the Royal British Legion Scotland and became a Commander of the Order of the British Empire in June 1946 for this service. He also served as a justice of the peace.

He died at home on 6 December 1949. He is buried in Portobello Cemetery with his family. The grave lies against the eastern boundary wall.

== Family ==
He was married to Sarah Ferris (d. 1950). Their children included William J. Robertson (1892–1964), Marion Robertson (1895–1971), and Ian Gordon Robertson (1897–1916). Ian was a second lieutenant in the Gordon Highlanders and was killed at Beaumont Hamel in France on 13 November 1916.

== Medals ==
His medals, including the Victoria Cross, are displayed at the National War Museum of Scotland, Edinburgh Castle, Edinburgh, Scotland.

== Freemasonry ==
He was a Scottish Freemason having been Initiated in Lodge Union, No. 332 (Glasgow), on 20 March, Passed on 10 April and raised on 1 May 1895. At a regular meeting of the Lodge on 20 March 1900 it was announced that Robertson had been awarded the VC.

== Bibliography ==
- Monuments to Courage (David Harvey, 1999)
- The Register of the Victoria Cross (This England, 1997)
- Scotland's Forgotten Valour (Graham Ross, 1995)
- Victoria Crosses of the Anglo-Boer War (Ian Uys, 2000)
