= Francis Newton Parsons =

Recipient of the Victoria Cross

Francis Newton Parsons VC
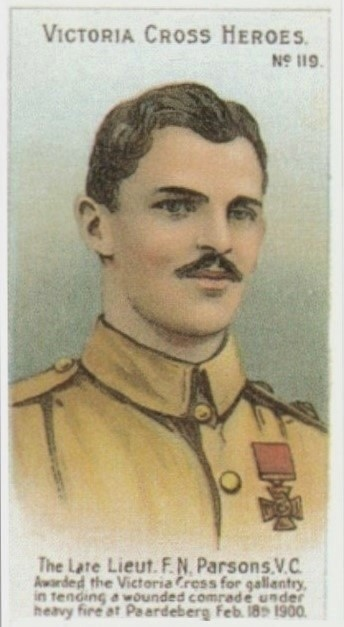
- Lieut Parsons depicted on a cigarette card
- Born: 23 March 1875; Dover, Kent
- Died: 10 March 1900 (aged 24); Driefontein, South Africa
- Burial place: Driefontein Cemetery
- Military career
- Allegiance: United Kingdom
- Branch: British Army
- Service years: 1896–1900
- Rank: Lieutenant
- Units: Essex Regiment
- Conflicts: Second Boer War †
- Awards: Victoria Cross

Francis Newton Parsons VC (23 March 1875 in Dover – 10 March 1900) was educated at Dover College, joined the Essex Regiment and served in the Second Boer War. He was an English recipient of the Victoria Cross, the highest and most prestigious award for gallantry in the face of the enemy that can be awarded to British and Commonwealth forces.

== Military career ==
Parsons was a chorister educated at King's College School, Cambridge, from where he proceeded to Dover College, and then to the Royal Military College, Sandhurst. On graduation he was commissioned as a second lieutenant in the Essex Regiment on 28 February 1896. He was promoted to lieutenant on 1 March 1898.

Parsons was a 24 years old Lieutenant in the 1st Battalion, Essex Regiment, British Army, when he was awarded the VC during the Second Boer War. He was recommended for the award by Lieutenant-General Kelly-Kenny, C.B. with the citation published in the London Gazette of 20 November 1900:

THE Queen has been graciously pleased to award the decoration of the Victoria Cross to the undermentioned Officer, whose claims have been submitted for Her Majesty's approval, for his conspicuous bravery during the engagement at Paardeberg, as stated against his name : —

[...]

Essex Regiment, Lieutenant Francis Newton Parsons (since deceased)

On the morning of the 15 February 1900, at Paardeberg, on the south bank of the River Modder, Private Ferguson, 1st Battalion Essex Regiment, was wounded and fell in a place devoid of cover. While trying to crawl under cover, he was again wounded, in the stomach, Lieutenant Parsons at once went to his assistance, dressed his wound under heavy fire, went down twice (still under heavy fire) to the bank of the river to get water for Private Ferguson, and subsequently carried him to a place of safety.

This Officer was recommended for the Victoria Cross by Lieutenant-General Kelly-Kenny, C.B. on 3rd March latt.

Lieutenant Parsons was killed on the 10 March, in the engagement at Driefontein, on which occasion he again displayed conspicuous gallantry.

Parsons also received a posthumous Mention in Despatches on 8 February 1901.

== Medal ==
His Victoria Cross is displayed at The Essex Regiment Museum, Chelmsford, Essex, England.

== Bibliography ==
- Monuments to Courage (David Harvey, 1999)
- The Register of the Victoria Cross (This England, 1997)
- Victoria Crosses of the Anglo-Boer War (Ian Uys, 2000)
- Ingleton, Roy (2011). Kent VCs. Pen and Sword Books. ISBN 978-1848844094.
