= Herman Albrecht =

Recipient of the Victoria Cross

Herman Albrecht VC
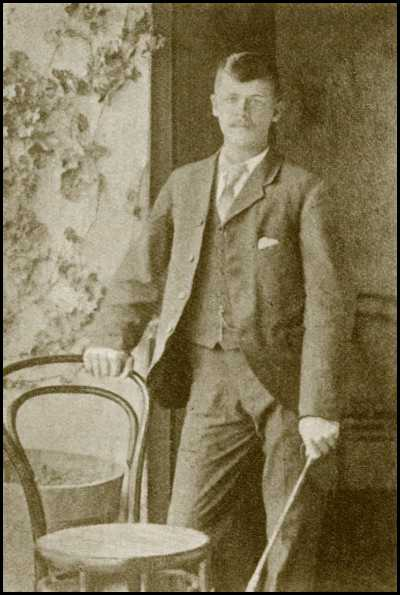
- Born: 1876; Burgersdorp
- Died: 6 January 1900 (aged 23); Wagon Hill, nr. Ladysmith
- Burial place: ILH Memorial, Platrand, Ladysmith
- Military career
- Allegiance: Colony of Natal
- Rank: Trooper
- Units: Imperial Light Horse
- Conflicts: Second Boer War
- Awards: Victoria Cross

Herman Albrecht VC (1876 – 6 January 1900) was a Cape Colony recipient of the Victoria Cross, the highest and most prestigious award for gallantry in the face of the enemy that can be awarded to British and Commonwealth forces.

== Details ==
Albrecht was about 24 years old, and a Trooper in the Imperial Light Horse (Natal), South African Forces during the Second Boer War when the following deed took place for which he was awarded the Victoria Cross.

On 6 January 1900 during the attack on Wagon Hill, near Ladysmith, South Africa, Lieutenant Robert James Thomas Digby-Jones of the Royal Engineers and Trooper Albrecht led the force which re-occupied the top of the hill at a critical moment, just as the three foremost attacking Boers reached it. The leader was shot by the lieutenant and the two others by Trooper Albrecht. He was jointed cited with Lt Digby-Jones:

Lieutenant R. J. T. Digby Jones, Royal Engineers, and No. 459 Trooper H. Albrecht, Imperial Light Horse, Would have been recommended for the Victoria Cross had they survived, on account of their having during the attack on Waggon Hill (Ladysmith) of 6th January, 1900, displayed conspicuous bravery, and gallant conduct in leading the force which re-occupied the top of the hill at a critical moment just as the three foremost attacking Boers reached it, the leader being shot by Lieutenant Jones, and the two others by Trooper Albrecht. (Note: On 8 August 1902 as a result of a revision in the policy in the war office which allowed posthumous awards of the Victoria Cross, Trooper Herman Albrecht along with the other men who fallen during the recent operation in the performance of acts of valour which would in the opinion of the Commander in Chief had entitled them to a Victoria Cross were awarded them.)

== The Medal ==
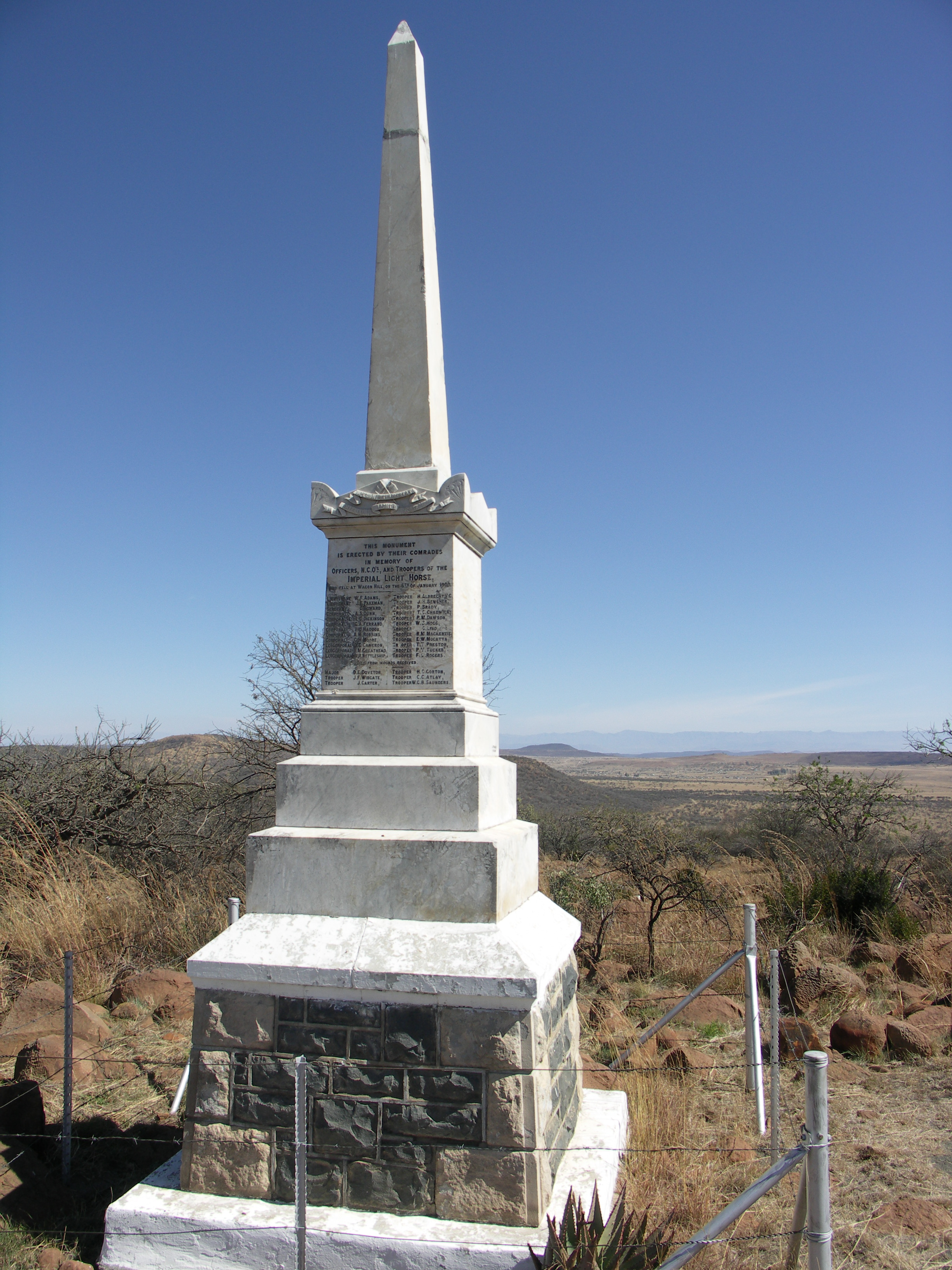
Herman Albrecht is remembered on the Imperial Light Horse Memorial on Platrand Ladysmith (28°35′25″S 29°45′30″E) — at the location of the Battle of Wagon Hill

His Victoria Cross is displayed at the National Museum of Military History in Johannesburg.

== See also ==
- The Register of the Victoria Cross
- List of Second Boer War Victoria Cross recipients
