= Frederick Kempster =

English showman

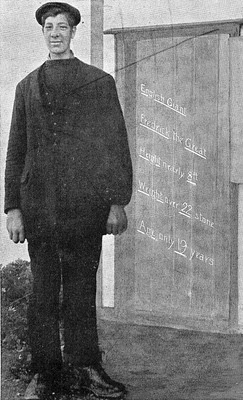
- Fred Kempster standing at a doorway in 1908
- Born: Frederick John Kempster; 13 April 1889; Bayswater, London, United Kingdom
- Died: 15 April 1918 (aged 29); Blackburn, Lancashire, United Kingdom
- Resting place: Blackburn Old Cemetery; 53°46'01.7"N 2°28'11.8"W
- Other names: English Giant; Blackburn Giant
- Occupation: Circus giant
- Known for: Extreme height
- Height: 2.37 m (7 ft 9 1/2 in)

Frederick Kempster (1889–1918) was an English showman, renowned for his extreme height and also known as the English Giant or Blackburn Giant. He was 7 ft 9.3 in (2.37 m) tall, had an arm span of 8 ft 4.5 in (2.55 m) and weighed 170 kilograms (370 lb).

Between 1967 and 1993 Kempster appeared in the Guinness Book of Records as one of the tallest men in England.

== Early life ==
Kempster was born on 13 April 1889 in London to Joseph and Jane Kempster and was the second youngest of four sons and three daughters. His mother described him as "a jolly, laughing boy, of a very liberal and generous disposition".

On Christmas Day 1897, his father died and eight-year-old Kempster and his two-year-old brother George were placed by their mother in the care of a Barnardo's orphanage in September 1898. As a boy, he was smaller than average for his age, being just over 4ft tall at the age of 9 and a half.

Shipped off to Canada by the charity, Kempster returned to England on 12 November 1904, aged 15. He was by now suffering from a congenital knee problem leading to ligament problems and growth at the upper end of the tibia. This uncontrolled growth was to lead to his increasing height.

He lived with his sister, Ruth, in Wiltshire and by the age of 22 he was said to stand just less than 7 ft 4 in (2.24 m) and he started to get both public and press attention leading to him seeing his unusual height as a means to make a living. By 1913 he stood slightly over 7 ft 9.3 in (2.37 m).

== Circus life ==
In June 1911, Kempster joined the Astley and Co.'s American Circus at Chigwell in Essex as a professional giant. In March 1914, he went on a tour of Europe and differing sources alleged his height anywhere from 8 ft 4in to 8 ft 8in. Often the circus' management would exaggerate Kempster's height to entice more visitors.

At the outbreak of the First World War in 1914, Kempster was in Germany and was placed under house arrest in Berlin by the German authorities. He was released after a month and returned to Britain where he was interviewed by the London press. He visited his brother, George, who was recovering in hospital after being wounded in France in 1916. Kempster continued to tour around Britain in 1917 and contracted influenza in Blackburn.

== Death and burial ==
Kempster died, aged 29, in the Queen's Park Hospital, Blackburn in 1918 and was buried in a 9 ft (2.7 m) coffin in a 10 ft (3.0 m) grave in Blackburn Cemetery. Case notes from the hospital state Kempster was 7 ft 9.3 in (2.37 m) when he died. His grave stone also calls him 'The British Giant'.
