= Henry Edward Manning Douglas =

British Army general and recipient of the Victoria Cross (1875–1939)

Major-General Henry Edward Manning Douglas VC CB CMG DSO FRGS
- Born: 11 July 1875; Gillingham, Kent
- Died: 14 February 1939 (aged 63); Droitwich, Worcestershire
- Burial place: Epsom Cemetery, Surrey
- Military career
- Allegiance: United Kingdom
- Branch: British Army
- Service years: 1899-1933
- Rank: Major-General
- Unit: Royal Army Medical Corps
- Conflicts: Second Boer War; Third Somaliland Expedition; First Balkan War; World War I Russian Civil War
- Awards: Victoria Cross; Order of the Bath; Order of St Michael and St George; Distinguished Service Order; Croix de Guerre (France); Order of St. Sava (Serbia)

Major-General Henry Edward Manning Douglas VC CB CMG DSO FRGS (11 July 1875 – 14 February 1939) was a British Army officer and an English recipient of the Victoria Cross, the highest and most prestigious award for gallantry in the face of the enemy that can be awarded to British and Commonwealth forces.

== Biography ==
Born in Gillingham, Medway, Douglas took the Scottish Triple Qualification (LRCP(Edin), LRCS(Edin), LRCPS(Glas) in 1898. He was commissioned as a lieutenant in the Royal Army Medical Corps on 28 July 1899, and travelled to South Africa following the outbreak of the Second Boer War three months later.

Captain H.E.M. Douglas in 1908 (rightmost) as part of the Clark Expedition

Douglas was 24 years old, and a lieutenant in the Royal Army Medical Corps during the Second Boer War, when the following deed earned him the Victoria Cross at the Battle of Magersfontein, South Africa, on 11 December 1899:

On the 11th December, 1899, during the action at Magersfontein, Lieutenant Douglas showed great gallantry and devotion under a very severe fire in advancing in the open and attending to Captain Gordon, Gordon Highlanders, who was wounded, and also attending to Major Robinson and other wounded men under a fearful fire. Many similar acts of devotion and gallantry were performed by Lieutenant Douglas on the same day.

Douglas was himself wounded by a bullet in the face at Magersfontein, and was invalided back home. He returned to South Africa only two months later, however, leaving Southampton in the SS Ottoman in late February 1900, and continued to serve until he returned to the United Kingdom in early 1901. He received the VC from King Edward VII during an investiture at Marlborough House on 25 July 1901. The following year he was appointed for light duty in the Home District, and promoted to captain on 28 July 1902.

In 1908-9 he was a member of the Sowerby-Clark expedition for sixteen months into north China.

He served in the First World War and later achieved the rank of Major General. In October 1914, the Duchess of Wellington’s Hospital was opened at the Casino at La Touquet with a staff of sixty orderlies, nineteen Bart’s nurses and four qualified dressers. The chief surgeon was Major (later Sir) Charles Watson FRCS assisted by five Medical Officers. Its commandant was Major HEM Douglas RAMC, VC, DSO.

He is buried in Epsom. His Victoria Cross is displayed at the Army Medical Services Museum in Aldershot, England.

== Bibliography ==
- Monuments to Courage (David Harvey, 1999)
- The Register of the Victoria Cross (This England, 1997)
- Victoria Crosses of the Anglo-Boer War (Ian Uys, 2000)
- Ingleton, Roy (2011). Kent VCs. Pen and Sword Books. ISBN 978-1848844094.
