= James Pitts (VC) =

Recipient of the Victoria Cross (1877–1955)

James Pitts VC MSM
- Born: 26 February 1877; Blackburn, Lancashire
- Died: 18 February 1955 (aged 77); Blackburn
- Burial place: Blackburn Cemetery, Blackburn
- Military career
- Allegiance: United Kingdom
- Branch: British Army
- Rank: Corporal
- Units: The Manchester Regiment
- Conflicts: Second Boer War
- Awards: Victoria Cross; Meritorious Service Medal

James Pitts VC MSM (26 February 1877 – 18 February 1955) was an English recipient of the Victoria Cross, the highest and most prestigious award for gallantry in the face of the enemy that can be awarded to British and Commonwealth forces.

== Details ==
Pitts was 22 years old, and a private in the 1st Battalion, the Manchester Regiment, British Army, during the Second Boer War when the following deed in Natal took place for which he and Private Robert Scott were awarded the VC:

During the attack on Caesar's Camp, in Natal, on the 6th January, 1900, these two men occupied a sangar, on the left of which all our men had been shot down and their positions occupied by Boers, and held their post for fifteen hours without food or water, all the time under an extremely heavy fire, keeping up their fire and a smart look-out though the Boers occupied some sangars on their immediate left rear. Private Scott was wounded.

He later achieved the rank of corporal and served in World War I. He was awarded the Meritorious Service Medal in 1918.

== The medal ==
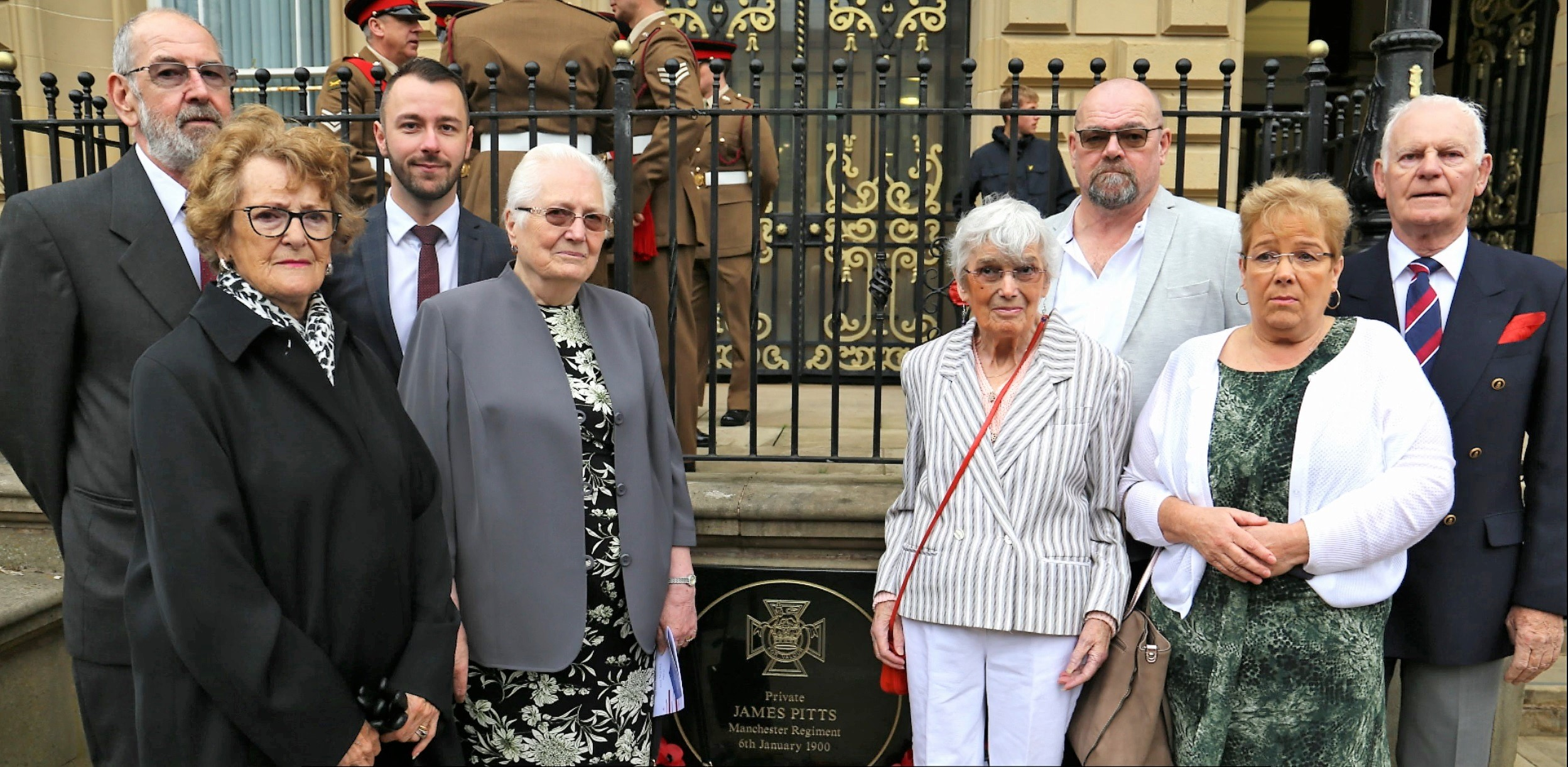
4 generations of Pitts's family attend 2019 unveiling of plaque in his honour in Blackburn.

His Victoria Cross is displayed at the Museum of the Manchesters, Ashton-under-Lyne, England.

In 2019, a plaque in his honour was unveiled at Blackburn town hall.
