= Robert Digby-Jones =

Recipient of the Victoria Cross

Robert Digby-Jones VC
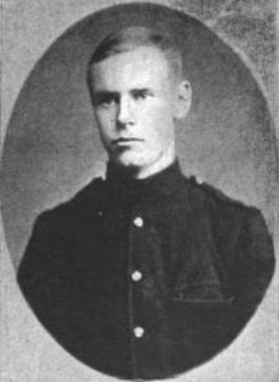
- Born: 27 September 1876; Edinburgh, Scotland
- Died: 6 January 1900 (aged 23); Ladysmith, South Africa
- Burial place: Ladysmith Cemetery
- Military career
- Allegiance: United Kingdom
- Branch: British Army
- Service years: 1896–1900 †
- Rank: Lieutenant
- Units: Royal Engineers
- Conflicts: Second Boer War
- Awards: Victoria Cross
- Other work: Royal Engineers A.F.C. player

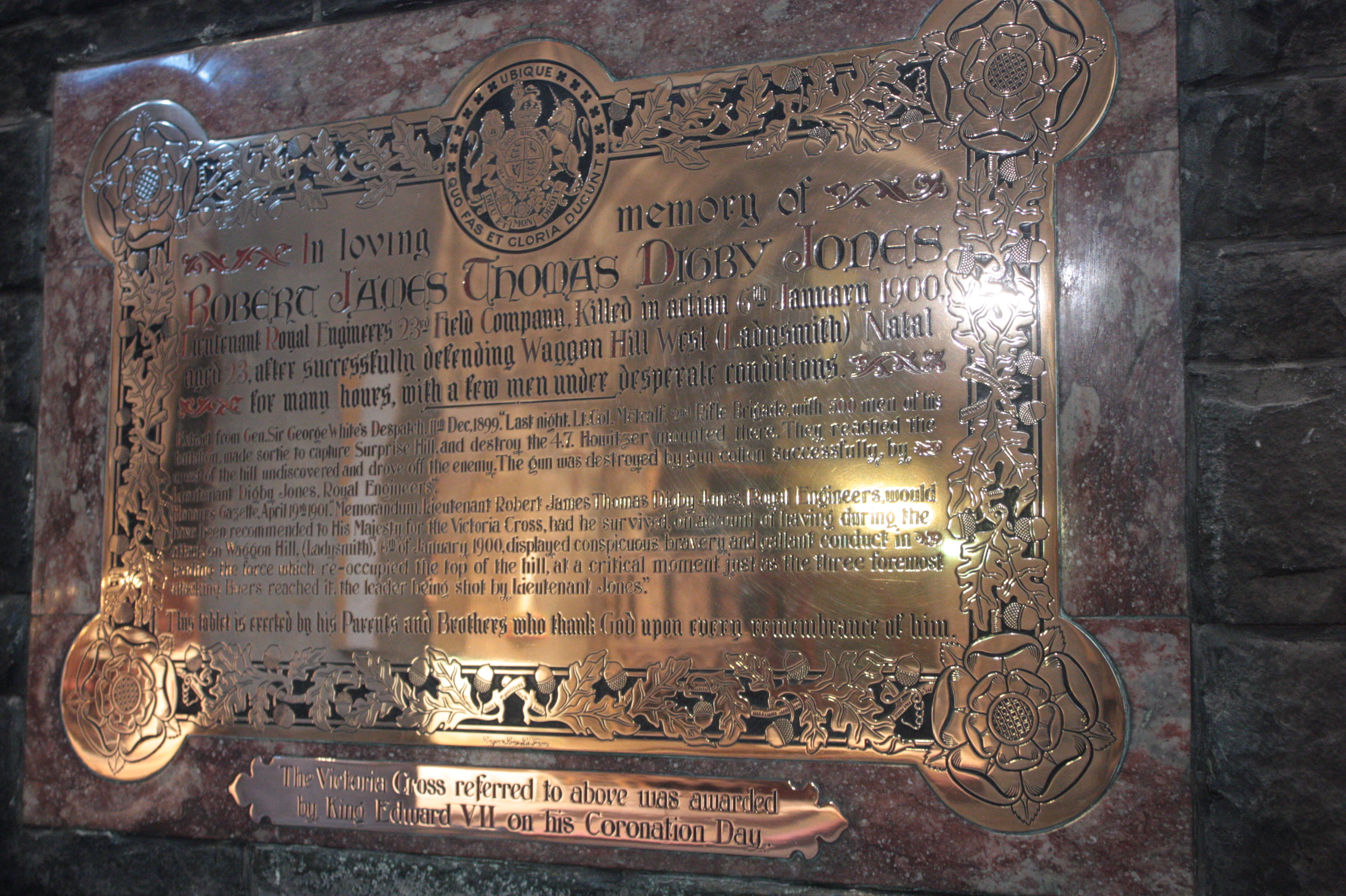
Plaque to Robert Digby-Jones VC in St Mary's Episcopal Cathedral, Edinburgh

Robert James Thomas Digby-Jones (27 September 1876 – 6 January 1900) was a Scottish recipient of the Victoria Cross, the highest and most prestigious award for gallantry in the face of the enemy that can be awarded to British and Commonwealth forces.

== Details ==
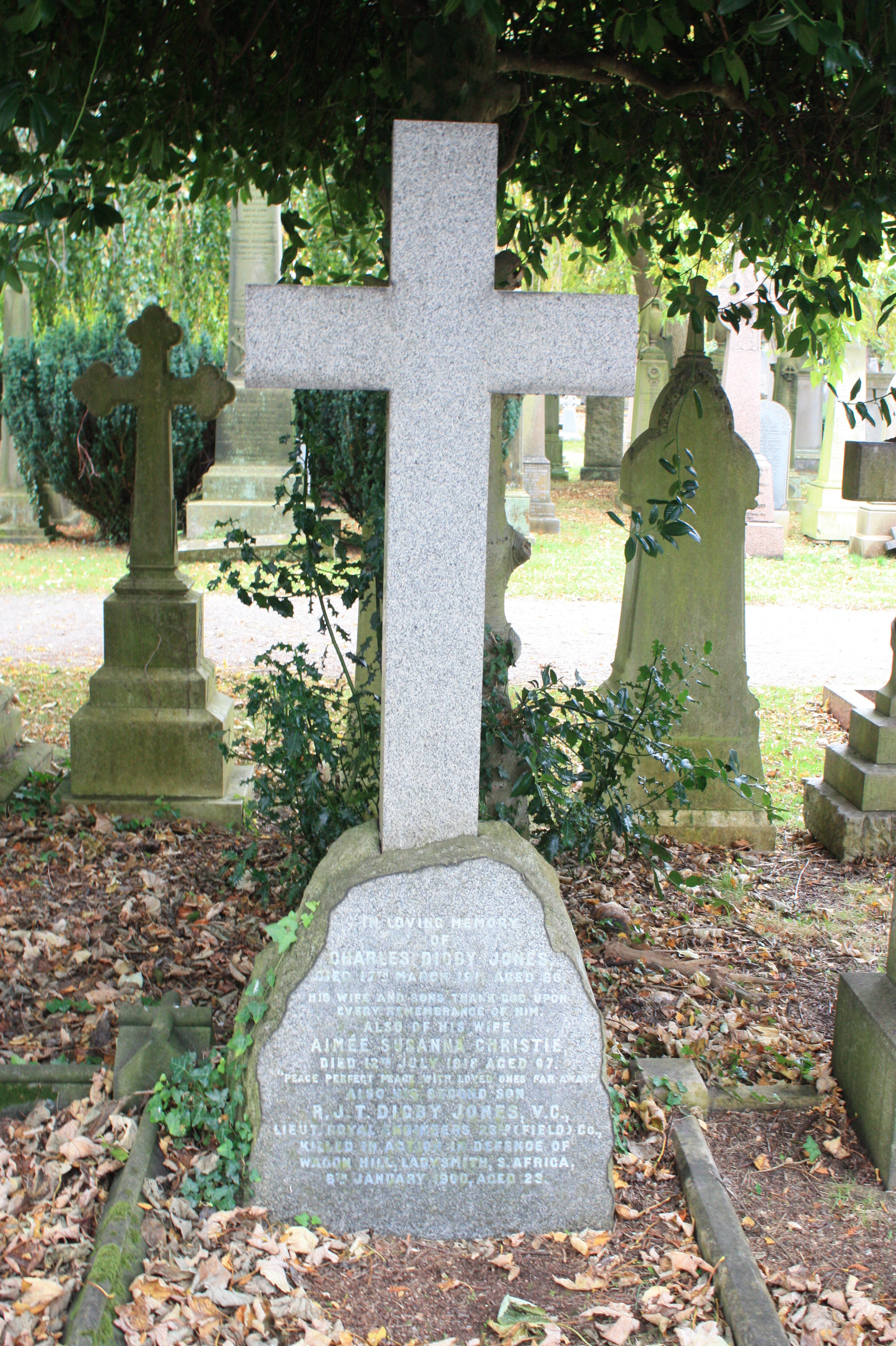
The Digby Jones memorial, Dean Cemetery

He was born at Chester Street in Edinburgh, the son of Charles Digby Jones (1844–1911) and his wife, Aimee Susanna Christie. He was educated at Alnmouth and then Sedbergh School. In 1894 he was sent to the Royal Military Academy, Woolwich and trained as an officer in the Royal Engineers. He is recorded as a keen and popular sportsman, both in golf and rugby.

When he was 23 years old, and a lieutenant in the Corps of Royal Engineers, British Army during the Boer War when the following deed took place for which he was awarded the VC.

On 6 January 1900 during the attack on Wagon Hill (Ladysmith), South Africa, Lieutenant Digby-Jones and a trooper (Herman Albrecht) of the Imperial Light Horse led the force which re-occupied the top of the hill at a critical moment, but both were killed in the ensuing mêlée. For their actions they cited jointly:

Lieutenant R. J. T. Digby Jones, Royal Engineers, and No. 459 Trooper H. Albrecht, Imperial Light Horse, Would have been recommended for the Victoria Cross had they survived, on account of their having during the attack on Waggon Hill (Ladysmith) of 6th January, 1900, displayed conspicuous bravery, and gallant conduct in leading the force which re-occupied the top of the hill at a critical moment just as the three foremost attacking Boers reached it, the leader being shot by Lieutenant Jones, and the two others by Trooper Albrecht. (Note: On 8 August 1902 as a result of a revision in the policy in the war office which allowed posthumous awards of the Victoria Cross, Lieutenant Digby-Jones along with the other men who fallen during the recent operation in the performance of acts of valour which would in the opinion of the Commander in Chief had entitled them to a Victoria Cross were awarded them.)

Digby-Jones is buried in Ladysmith Cemetery.

He is also memorialised on his parents grave in Dean Cemetery in Edinburgh.

== Memorials and the medal ==
- Digby-Jones's Victoria Cross is displayed at the Royal Engineers Museum (Chatham, England).
- A memorial to Digby-Jones stands in his old school, Sedbergh, commemorating his brave deeds.
- A brass plaque to Digby-Jones lies on the south aisle of St Mary's Episcopal Cathedral in Edinburgh. The plaque states that it was erected by his parents and brothers.
- A cairn was erected at Waggon Hill at the spot where he died
- A memorial plaque to his memory also stands in Alnmouth Parish Church

== Family ==
He came from a long line of military personnel and another cousin, Robert Hope Moncrieff Aitken had already won a Victoria Cross.
