= William Bees =

Recipient of the Victoria Cross

William Dolman Bees VC
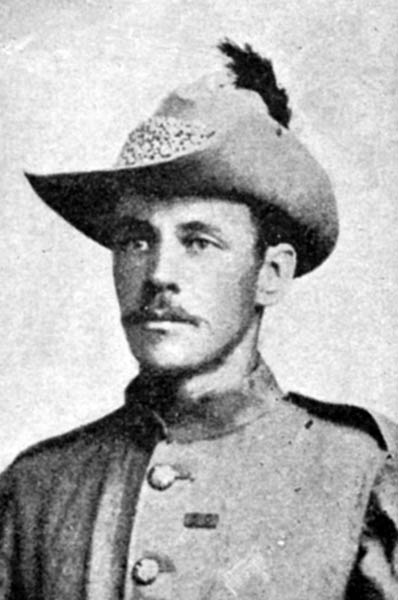
- Born: 12 September 1871; Midsomer Norton, Somerset
- Died: 20 June 1938 (aged 66); Coalville, Leicestershire
- Burial place: London Road Cemetery, Coalville
- Military career
- Allegiance: United Kingdom
- Branch: British Army
- Service years: 1890–1902, 1915–1919
- Rank: Corporal
- Units: Derbyshire Regiment
- Conflicts: Tirah Campaign; Second Boer War; World War I
- Awards: Victoria Cross

William Dolman Bees VC (12 September 1871 – 20 June 1938) was an English recipient of the Victoria Cross, the highest and most prestigious award for gallantry in the face of the enemy that can be awarded to British and Commonwealth forces.

Born in Midsomer Norton, Somerset he was 29 years old, and a private in the 1st Battalion, The Derbyshire Regiment (later The Sherwood Foresters), British Army during the Second Boer War when the following deed took place on 30 September 1901 at Moedwil, South Africa for which he was awarded the VC:

Private Bees was one of the Maxim-gun detachment, which at Moedwil, on the 30th September, 1901, had six men hit out of nine. Hearing his wounded comrades asking for water, he went forward, under a heavy fire, to a spruit held by Boers about 500 yards ahead of the gun, and brought back a kettle full of water. In going and returning he had to pass within 100 yards of some rocks also held by Boers, and the kettle which he was carrying was hit by several bullets.

He later achieved the rank of corporal. His Victoria Cross is displayed at the Sherwood Foresters Museum at Nottingham Castle, England.
