= Alfred Atkinson =

Recipient of the Victoria Cross

Alfred Atkinson VC
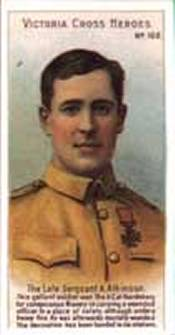
- Atkinson as depicted on a cigarette card
- Born: 6 February 1874; Leeds, West Yorkshire
- Died: 21 February 1900 (aged 26); Paardeberg, Transvaal †
- Burial place: Gruisbank British Cemetery, Paardeberg
- Military career
- Allegiance: United Kingdom
- Branch: British Army
- Rank: Sergeant
- Units: The Princess of Wales’s Own (Yorkshire Regiment)
- Conflicts: Second Boer War
- Awards: Victoria Cross

Alfred Atkinson (6 February 1874 – 21 February 1900) was an English recipient of the Victoria Cross, the highest and most prestigious award for gallantry in the face of the enemy that can be awarded to British and Commonwealth forces.

Alfred was born in Armley in Leeds and was the son of James Harland Atkinson (born ~1830 at Kirkby Malzeard, Yorkshire) and Margaret Mansfield (born ~1833 at Leeds, Yorkshire) who were married in Leeds on 4 June 1855. James Harland Atkinson was a Shoeing Smith in the Royal Artillery.

He was 26 years old, and a sergeant in the 1st Battalion, The Princess of Wales's Own (Yorkshire Regiment), British Army during the Second Boer War when the following deed took place on 18 February 1900 during the Battle of Paardeberg, South Africa for which he was (posthumously) awarded the VC:

No. 3264 Sergeant A. Atkinson, Yorkshire Regiment.

During the battle of Paardeburg, 18th February, 1900, Sergeant A. Atkinson, 1st Battalion Yorkshire Regiment, went out seven-times,

under heavy and close fire, to obtain water for the wounded. At the seventh attempt he was wounded in the head, and died a few days afterwards. (Note: On 8 August 1902, as a result of a revision in the policy in the war office which allowed posthumous awards of the Victoria Cross, Sergeant Atkinson along with other men who had fallen during the recent war in South Africa, in the performance of acts of valour which would in the opinion of the Commander in Chief have entitled them to a Victoria Cross had they survived.)

His Victoria Cross is displayed at the Green Howards Museum, Richmond, Yorkshire, England.
