= Moedwil =

- Location within North West (South African province) Location within South Africa
- Coordinates: 25.633°S 26.967°E
- Country: South Africa
- Province: North West
- District: Bojanala
- Municipality: Kgetlengrivier
- Time zone: UTC+2 (SAST)
- PO box: 0315
- Area code: 014

Moedwil is a small town near Swartruggens, North West Province, South Africa. It was the site of a battle during the Second Boer War where for actions during the battle, William Bees was awarded the Victoria Cross.
