= West Yorkshire Regiment =

Former regiment of the British Army

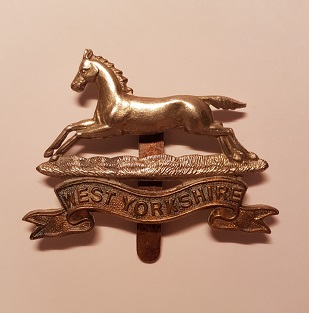
- Cap badge of the regiment
- Active: 1685–1958
- Country: Kingdom of England (1685–1707); Kingdom of Great Britain (1707–1800); United Kingdom (1801–1958)
- Branch: British Army
- Type: Line Infantry
- Size: 1–3 Regular Battalions Up to 2 Militia and Special Reserve Battalions; Up to 4 Territorial and Volunteer Battalions Up to 23 Hostilities-only Battalions
- RHQ: Bradford Moor Barracks (1873–1878); Imphal Barracks, York (1878–1958)
- Nicknames: The Old and Bold; Calvert's Entire; The Powos
- Mottos: Nec Aspera Terrent (Latin: Difficulties do not daunt)
- March: Ça Ira
- Anniversaries: Imphal (22 June)
- Engagements: Namur; Fontenoy; Falkirk; Culloden; Brandywine

The West Yorkshire Regiment (Prince of Wales's Own) (14th Foot) was an infantry regiment of the British Army. In 1958 it amalgamated with the East Yorkshire Regiment (15th Foot) to form the Prince of Wales's Own Regiment of Yorkshire which was, on 6 June 2006, amalgamated with the Green Howards and the Duke of Wellington's Regiment (West Riding) to form the Yorkshire Regiment (14th/15th, 19th and 33rd/76th Foot).

== History ==
=== Formation to 1776 ===
A regimental private in c. 1742

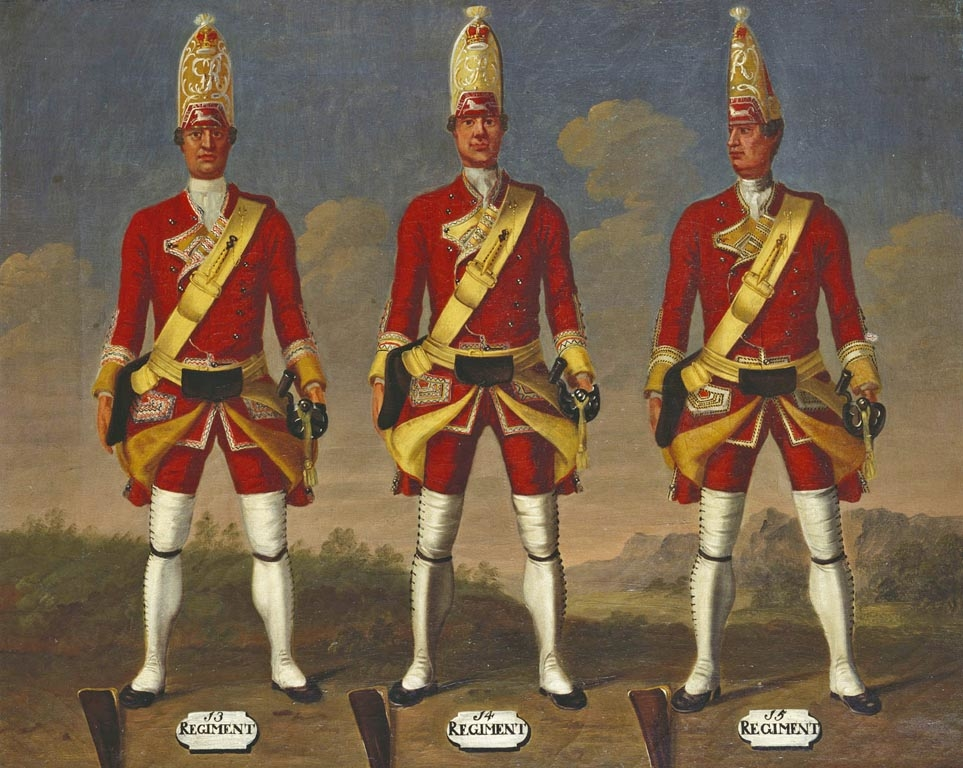
c. 1751 painting of a regimental grenadier (centre)

The regiment was raised by Sir Edward Hales in response to the 1685 Monmouth Rebellion. Following the 1688 Glorious Revolution and deposition of James II, Hales was replaced as colonel by William Beveridge; after serving in Scotland, the unit was sent to Flanders in 1693, and gained its first battle honour at Namur in 1695.

After the 1697 Treaty of Ryswick, the regiment served in Ireland until 1715, when it moved to Scotland to take part in the 1715 Jacobite Rising. It fought at Glen Shiel in 1719, before returning to England. Posted to Gibraltar in 1727 during the 1727 Siege, it served there as part of the garrison for the next 15 years.

During the War of the Austrian Succession, it fought at Fontenoy in 1745, before being recalled to Scotland to suppress the 1745 Rebellion, taking part in the battles of Falkirk and Culloden. Following the reforms of 1751, it became the 14th Regiment of Foot, then returned to Gibraltar for another 8-year stay. In 1765, when stationed at Windsor, it was granted royal permission for the grenadiers to wear bearskin caps with the White Horse of Hanover signifying the favour of the king. In 1766, the regiment left Portsmouth for North America and was stationed in Nova Scotia.

=== American War of Independence ===
Although part of the city garrison, the 14th was not involved in the Boston Massacre. Captain Thomas (29th Foot) was the officer of the day in charge of the duty detail (29th of Foot) that faced the crowds outside of the Customs House. The crowd that gathered began taunting the detail until a shot, then volley was fired into the crowd, three civilians were killed outright and two more died later. Captain Preston and the detail went to trial and were successfully defended by Lawyer John Adams thus ending tensions between the crown and the citizens of Boston for the time being.

The 14th remained in Boston until 1772, when it was sent to St Vincent in the Caribbean to help suppress a maroon rebellion. By 1774, losses caused by fighting and disease meant it was scheduled to return to England; due to the rising tensions in the colonies, it was instead redeployed piecemeal to St. Augustine, Florida and Providence Island in the Bahamas.

In January 1776, the 14th was part of the amphibious expedition that took part in the burning of Norfolk, Virginia. In August, the fleet returned to New York, where the remnants of the 14th were used to supplement other units, while its officers went back to Britain to recruit a new regiment.

In 1777, one company each from the newly formed 14th and the 15th regiments were sent to America under Colonel Patrick Ferguson to test the concept of the rifle company. These fought at the battle of Brandywine on 11 September; after returning to England, they became the light companies of their respective regiments.

=== French Revolutionary and Napoleonic Wars ===
On 21 August 1782, the regiment was renamed the 14th (Bedfordshire) Regiment of Foot. The outbreak of the French Revolutionary Wars and the subsequent French invasion of the Low Countries led to a British force commanded by the Duke of York being sent to join troops of the Imperial Austrian army. The 14th distinguished themselves in numerous actions, at Famars and Valenciennes in 1793 and at Tournai in 1794, for which they were subsequently granted the battle honour 'Tournay'. At the Battle of Famars, in order to encourage the men, Lieutenant-Colonel Welbore Ellis Doyle, the commanding officer, ordered the band of the 14th to play the French revolutionary song “Ça Ira”.

This was subsequently chosen as the Regimental march. In the final, unsuccessful attempt to check the French invasion of the Netherlands, the 14th also suffered heavy casualties in the hard-fought rearguard action at Geldermalsen on 8 January 1795. There followed the disastrous winter retreat into Germany. Returning to England the following May, the Regiment was then posted to the West Indies, where it was on duty until 1803. In February 1797, the regiment participated in the bloodless invasion of Trinidad.

The outbreak of the Napoleonic Wars in 1803 led to the expansion of the British Army. The 14th formed a second battalion in Belfast in 1804, and a third battalion in 1813. The 1st Battalion spent much of the war on garrison duty in Bengal. In 1809, the Regiment was re-titled The 14th (Buckinghamshire) Regiment. The 1st Battalion served in India for 25 years until 1831. During this period, the 1st Battalion took part in campaigns against the French in Mauritius in 1810, and the Dutch in Java in 1811, with Java adding another Battle Honour. It took part in the second Sambas expedition in June 1813 against the Sultanate of Sambas along with 600 Sepoy troops of the Bengal Army, capturing the town of Sambas.

Between 1808 and 1809, the 2nd Battalion joined the Peninsular Army and gained the Battle honour Corunna. The 2nd Battalion saw service in the Walcheren Campaign and was disbanded in 1817. The 3rd Battalion fought at the Battle of Waterloo in 1815; it was disbanded in 1816.

=== Victorian era ===
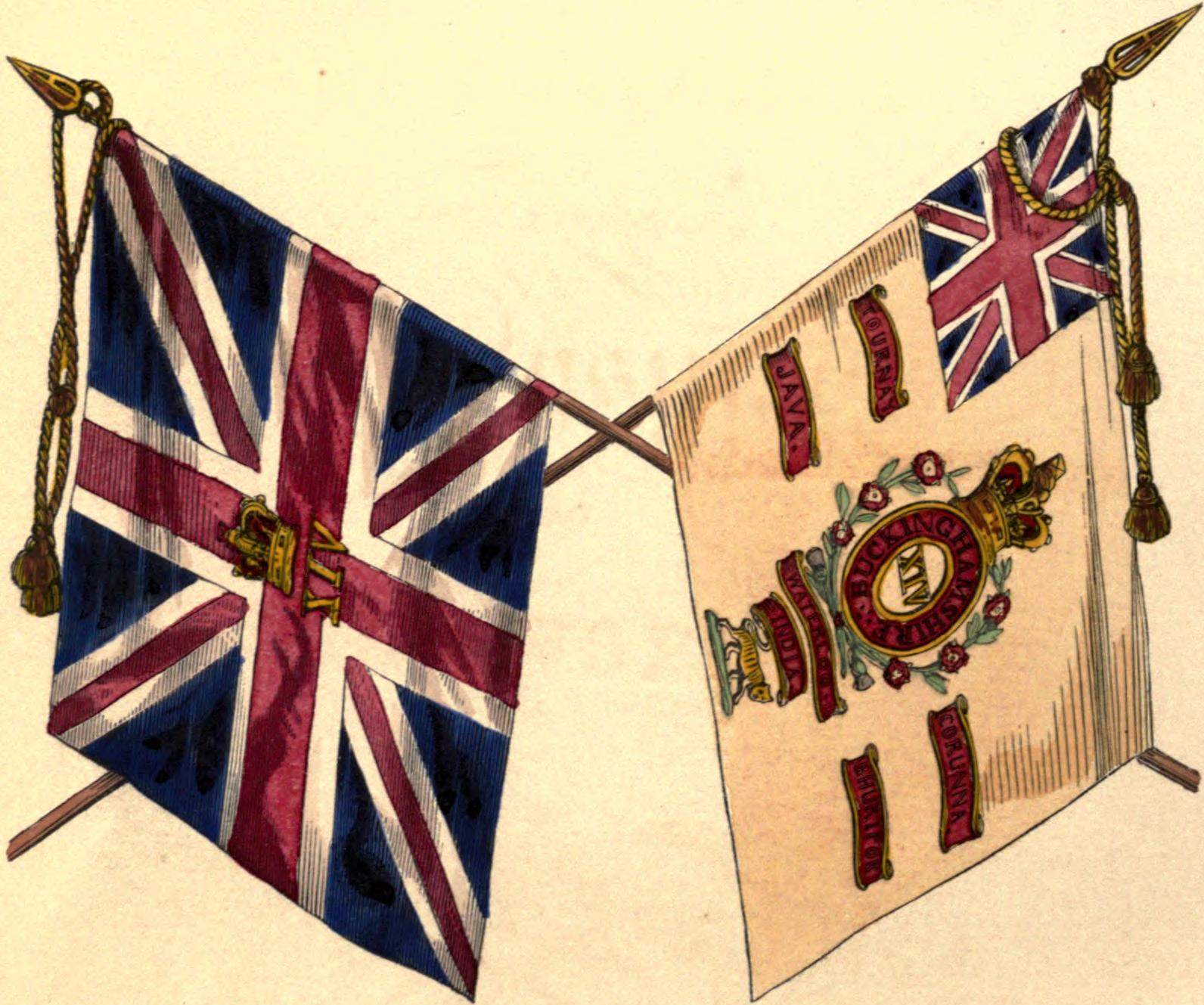
1845 illustration of the regimental colours

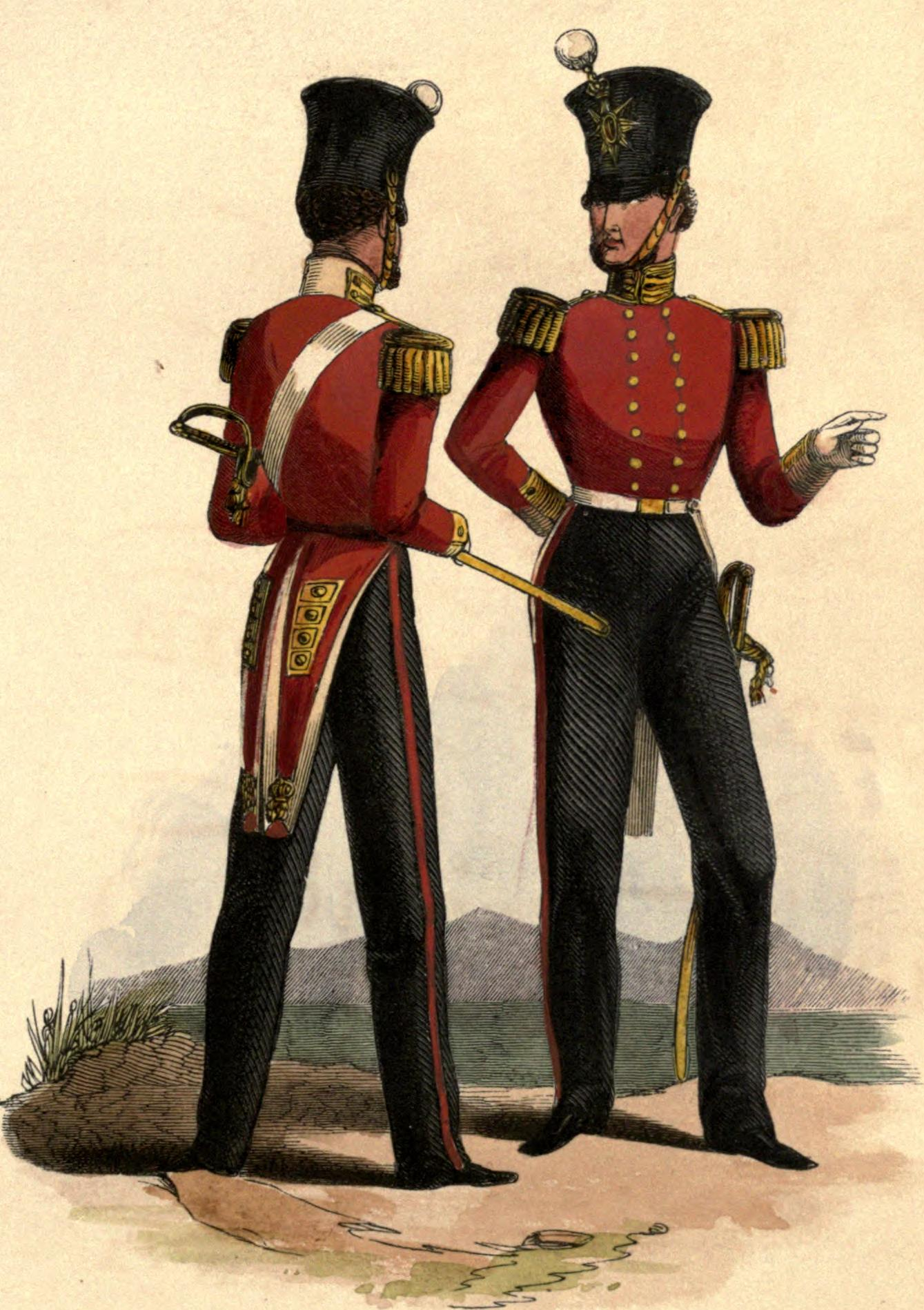
1845 illustration of two regimental officers

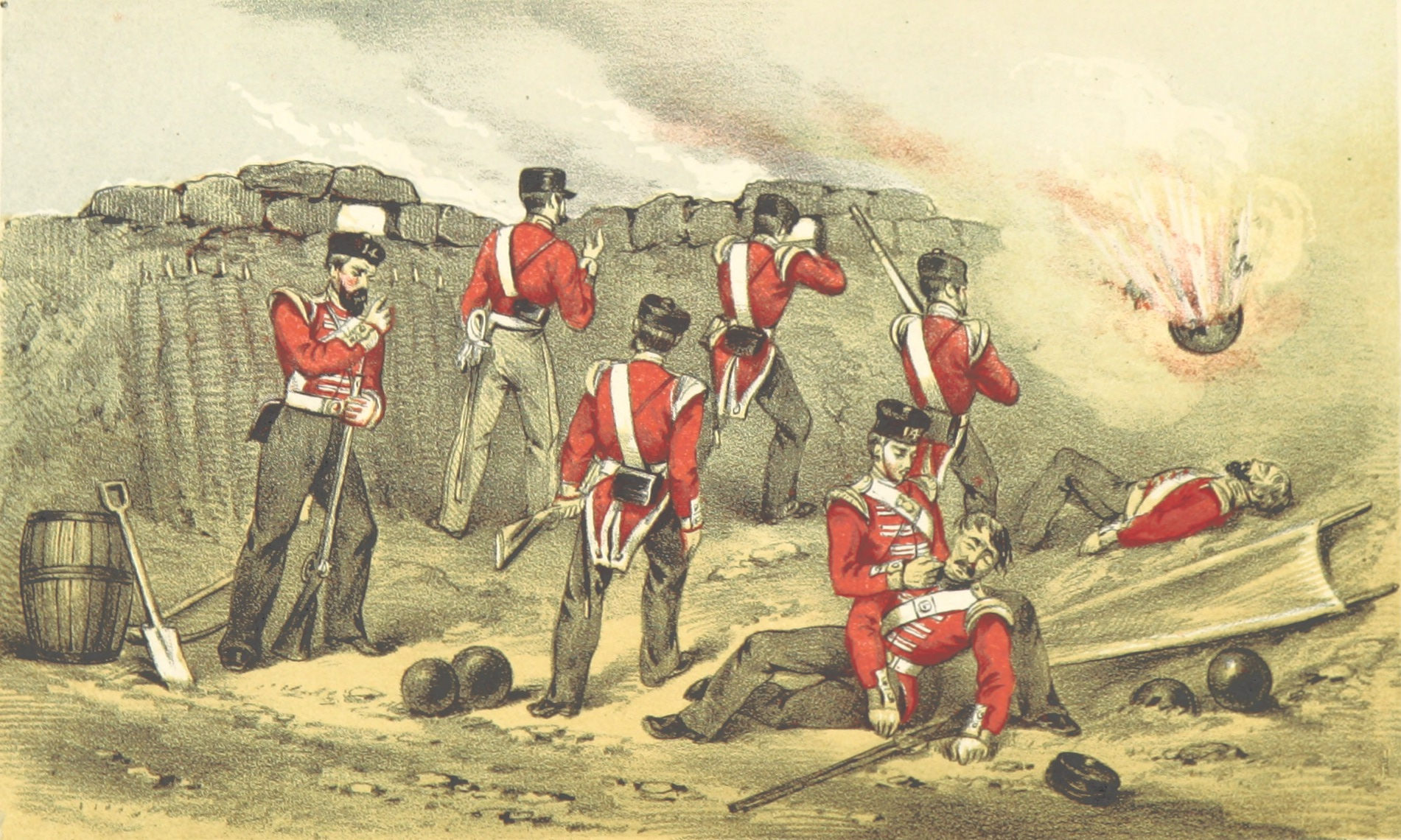
Regimental troops during the Crimean War

The 14th was then posted to the West Indies, Canada and Malta. In 1855, the Regiment served in the Crimean War. In 1876, the Prince of Wales presented new colours to the 1st Battalion and conferred on the 14th the honoured title of The Prince of Wales's Own. A second battalion was again raised in 1858 and took part in the New Zealand Wars and the Second Anglo-Afghan War.

The regiment was not fundamentally affected by the Cardwell Reforms of the 1870s, which gave it a depot at Bradford Moor Barracks from 1873, or by the Childers reforms of 1881 – as it already possessed two battalions, there was no need for it to amalgamate with another regiment. The regiment moved to Imphal Barracks in York in 1878. Under the reforms the regiment became The Prince of Wales's Own (West Yorkshire Regiment) on 1 July 1881.

Between 1895 and 1896 the 2nd Battalion served in the Gold Coast and took part in the Fourth Ashanti War.

=== Second Boer War ===
1899 saw the 2nd Battalion sent to the Second Boer War 1899–1902 in South Africa and after a number of engagements two members of the battalion were awarded the Victoria Cross: Captain (later Colonel) Mansel-Jones in February 1900, and Sergeant Traynor in February 1901. The 4th (Militia) Battalion was embodied in December 1899, and 500 officers and men left for South Africa in February 1900. The 1st, 2nd and 3rd Volunteer Battalions sent service companies to the Boer War and were granted the battle honour South Africa 1900–02.

The 3rd (Militia) Battalion was embodied on 4 May 1900, and served 14 months at Malta before being stationed at Chatham during autumn 1901. The battalion disembodied on 1 October 1902.

=== Early 20th century ===
In 1908, the Volunteers and Militia were reorganised nationally, with the former becoming the Territorial Force and the latter the Special Reserve; the regiment now had two Reserve and four Territorial battalions:

- 1st (V) Bn became 5th Bn (TF), with RHQ at Colliergate in York.
- 2nd (V) Bn became 6th Bn (TF), with RHQ at Belle Vue Barracks in Bradford (since demolished).
- 3rd (V) Bn became 7th and 8th (Leeds Rifles) Bns (TF), a double battalion with RHQ at Carlton Barracks in Leeds.

=== First World War ===
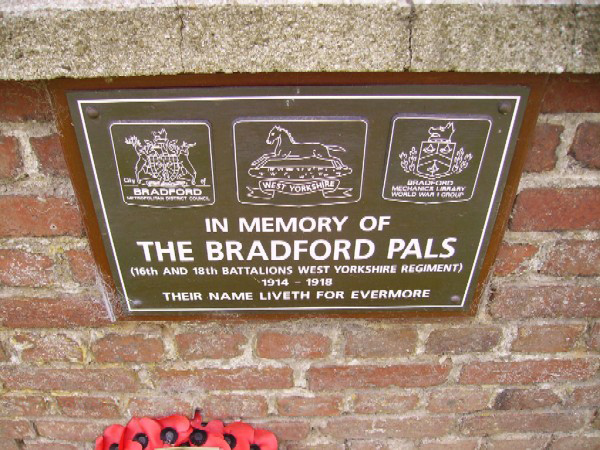
Memorial to the men of the 16th Battalion and the 18th Battalion of the regiment who died in the First World War

==== Regular Army ====
The 1st Battalion landed at Saint-Nazaire as part of the 18th Brigade in the 6th Division in September 1914 for service on the Western Front.

The 2nd Battalion landed at Le Havre as part of the 23rd Brigade in the 8th Division in November 1914 also for service on the Western Front.

==== Territorial Force ====
The 1/5th, 1/6th, 1/7th and 1/8th battalions landed at Boulogne-sur-Mer as part of the West Riding Brigade in the West Riding Division in April 1915 also for service on the Western Front.

The 2/5th, 2/6th, 2/7th and 2/8th battalions landed at Le Havre as part of the 185th (2/1st West Riding) Brigade in the 62nd (2nd West Riding) Division in January 1917 also for service on the Western Front.

==== New Armies ====
King George V inspecting the kit of a private of the 9th (Service) Battalion, West Yorkshire Regiment, at an infantry demonstration in preparation for the Third Battle of Ypres, at Wormhoudt, 6 July 1917. With him is Lieutenant Colonel F. P. Worsley, the battalion's commanding officer.

The 9th (Service) Battalion landed at Suvla Bay in Gallipoli as part of the 32nd Brigade in the 11th (Northern) Division in August 1915; the battalion was evacuated from Gallipoli in January 1916 and landed in Marseille in July 1916 for service on the Western Front.

The 10th (Service) Battalion landed at Boulogne-sur-Mer as part of the 50th Brigade in the 17th (Northern) Division in July 1915 for service on the Western Front.

The 11th (Service) Battalion landed at Le Havre as part of the 69th Brigade in the 23rd Division in August 1915 for service on the Western Front and then transferred to Italy in November 1917.

The 12th (Service) Battalion landed at Le Havre as part of the 63rd Infantry Brigade in the 21st Division in September 1915 also for service on the Western Front.

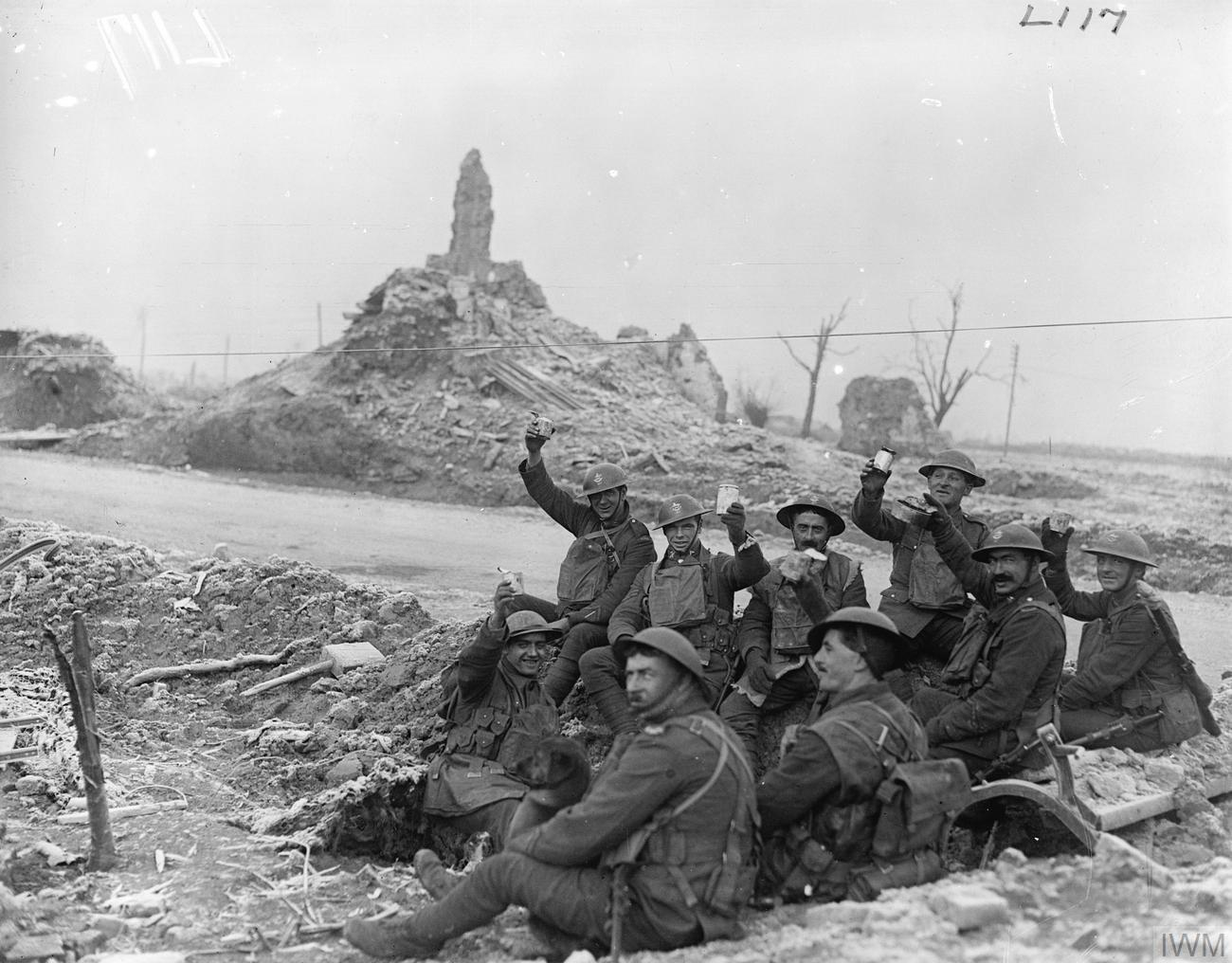
Men of a pioneer battalion of the West Yorkshire Regiment, possibly the 21st (Service) Battalion (Wool Textile Pioneers), having a meal in a shell hole on the roadside near Ypres, Belgium, 23 December 1917.

The 15th (Service) Battalion (1st Leeds), raised by the Lord Mayor and City of Leeds, and the 16th (Service) Battalion (1st Bradford), raised by the Lord Mayor and City of Bradford, landed in Egypt as part of the 93rd Brigade in the 31st Division in December 1915 and then moved to France in March 1916 for service on the Western Front.

The 17th (Service) Battalion (2nd Leeds), raised by the Lord Mayor and City of Leeds, landed at Le Havre as part of the 106th Brigade in the 35th Division in February 1916 for service on the Western Front.

The 18th (Service) Battalion (2nd Bradford), raised by the Lord Mayor and City of Bradford, landed in Egypt as part of the 93rd Brigade in the 31st Division in December 1915 and then moved to France in March 1916 for service on the Western Front.

The 21st (Service) Battalion (Wool Textile Pioneers) landed in France as pioneer battalion to the 4th Division in June 1916 also for service on the Western Front.

World War I Battalions
Regular	Territorial	War Raised	Reserve
1st Btn	5th Btn: 1/5th Btn (formed 1915, disembodied 1918); 2/5th Btn (formed 1914, disembodied 1918); 3/5th / 5th (Reserve) Btn (formed 1915, disbanded 1919)	10th (Service) Btn (formed 1914, disbanded 1919)	3rd (2nd West York Light Infantry) (Reserve) Btn
2nd Btn	6th Btn: 1/6th Btn (formed 1915, disembodied 1920); 6th (Reserve) Btn (formed 1915, absorbed in 1916)	11th (Service) Btn (formed 1914, disbanded 1919)	4th (4th West Yorkshire Militia) (Extra Reserve) Btn
	7th (Leeds Rifles) Btn: 1/7th Btn (formed 1915, disembodied 1919); 2/7th (Leeds Rifles) Btn (formed 1914, Cadre 1918, absorbed in 1918); 7th (Leeds Rifles) (Reserve) Btn (formed 1915, disbanded 1919)	12th (Service) Btn (formed 1914, amalgamated in 1918)	19th (Reserve) Btn (formed 1915, transferred 1916 to Territorial Reserve)
	8th (Leeds Rifles) Btn (formed 1914): 1/8th (Leeds Rifles) Btn (formed 1915, disembodied 1919); 2/8th (Leeds Rifles) Btn (formed 1914, amalgamated in 1918); 8th (Leeds Rifles) (Reserve) Btn (formed 1915, absorbed in 1919)	14th (Reserve) Btn (formed 1914, disbanded 1916)	20th (Reserve) Btn (formed 1915, transferred 1916 to Territorial Reserve)
	9th (Yorkshire Hussars) Btn (formed 1914, disbanded 1919)	15th (1st Leeds) (Service) Btn (formed 1914, absorbed 1917)	22nd (Labour) Btn (formed 1916, transferred 1917 to Labour Corps)
		16th (1st Bradford) (Service) Btn (formed 1914, disbanded 1918)	51st (Graduated) Btn (transferred in from Training Reserve 1917, became service btn 1919, disbanded 1919)
		17th (2nd Leeds) (Service) Btn (formed 1914, absorbed 1917)	52nd (Graduated) Btn (transferred in from Training Reserve 1917, became service btn 1919, disbanded 1919)
		18th (2nd Bradford) (Service) Btn (formed 1915, disbanded 1918)	53rd (Young Soldier) Btn (transferred in from Training Reserve 1917 (former 13th West Yorks), became service btn 1919, disbanded 1919)
		21st (Wool Textile Pioneers) (Service) Btn (formed 1915, disbanded 1919)	1st Garrison Btn (formed 1915, disbanded 1920)
		23rd (Service) Btn (formed 1918, absorbed 1918)	2nd (Home Service) Garrison Btn (formed 1916, transferred to Royal Defence Corps 1917)

=== Inter-war years ===
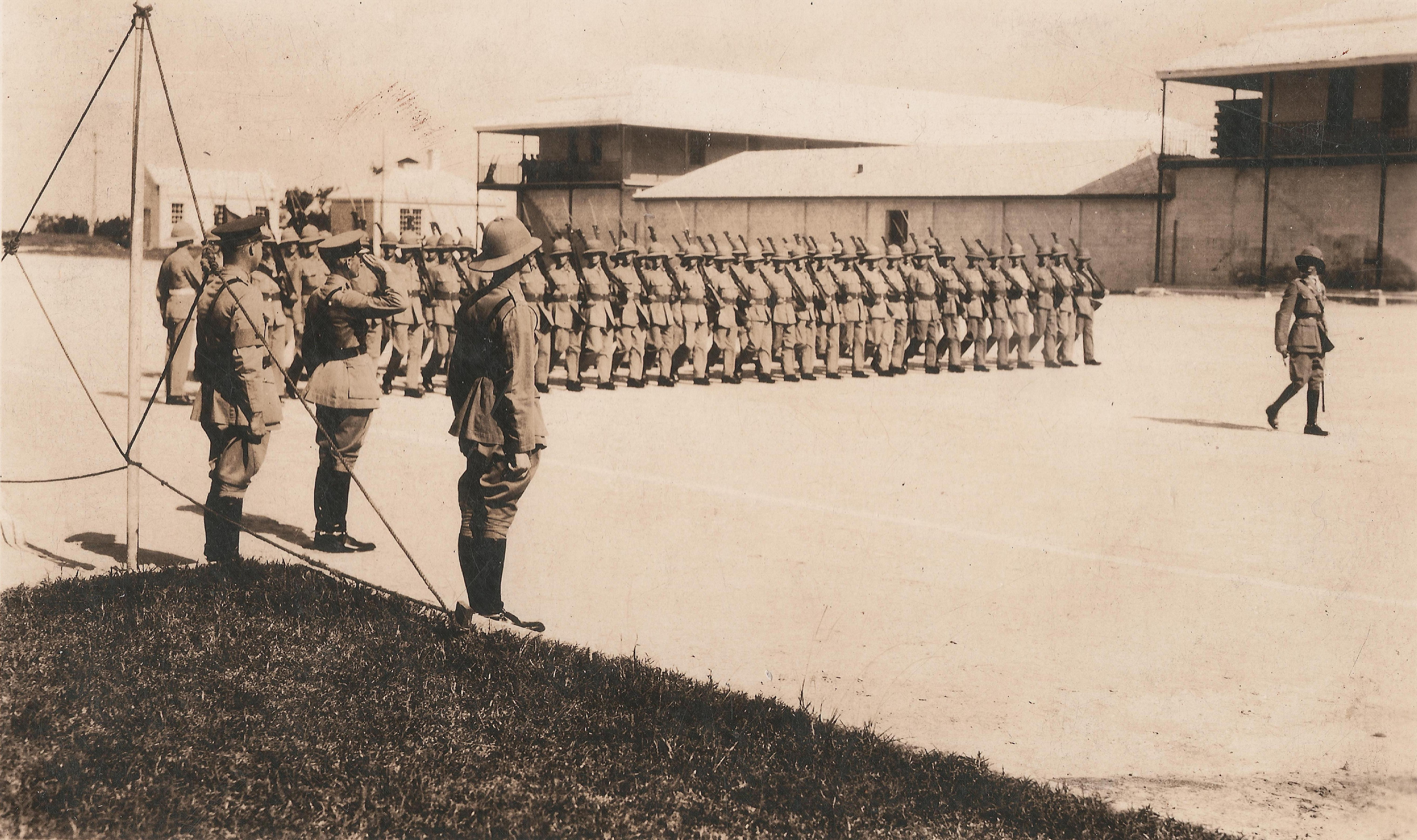
Governor and Commander-in-Chief of Bermuda Lieutenant-General Sir Louis Bols takes salute at Prospect Camp in 1930 (a Wing of the 1st Battalion was posted to the Bermuda Garrison from 1929 to 1931).

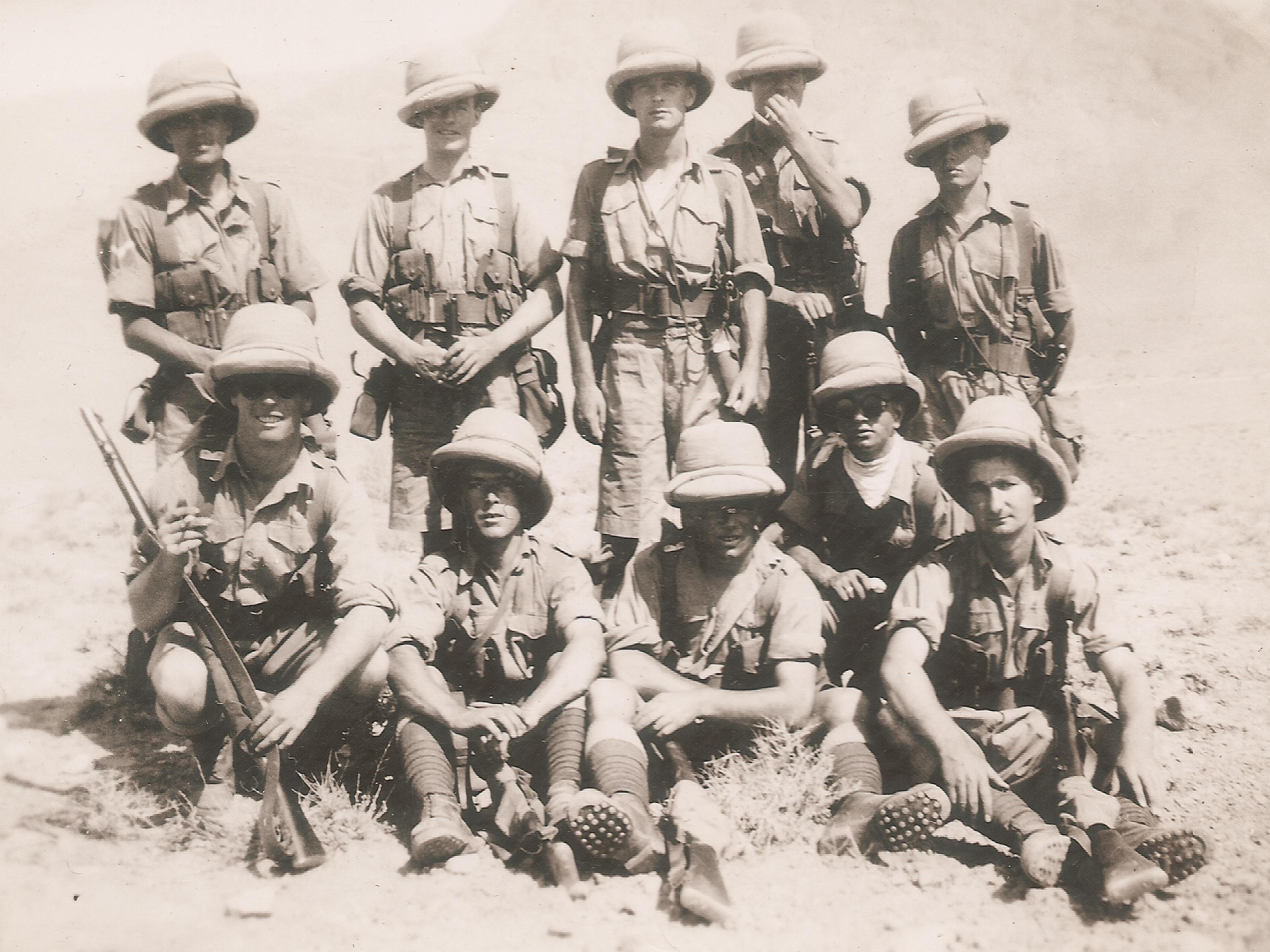
1st Battalion soldiers in Egypt, 1931-1933

A company of the 1st Battalion was posted to the Imperial fortress colony of Bermuda from 1929, relieving the 2nd Battalion, Argyll & Sutherland Highlanders, to 1931, when it was relieved by a company, 1st Battalion, Northumberland Fusiliers. This was at a time of significant cut backs to the British Army during the interwar period that saw the saw the disbandment or reduction of units such as the West India Regiment and Royal Guernsey Militia, while responsibility for coastal defence in Britain was transferred wholly to the Territorial Army. Garrisons throughout the Empire were removed or reduced. In the Bermuda Garrison, which could not be removed entirely given the colony's role as an Imperial fortress, the regular artillery and engineering companies were removed, with their duties transferred to reservists, while the regular infantry battalion was reduced to a company detached from whichever battalion was posted to Jamaica. Reservists again shouldered the additional responsibilities. The company in Bermuda rejoined the rest of the battalion on its return to Britain from Jamaica aboard the troopship "Lancashire". The unit would have a brief stay, disembarking briefly while other personnel were delivered to Southampton, but not permitted to leave the dock before reboarding for transport to its new station, Egypt.

In 1936 the 8th (Leeds Rifles) Battalion transferred to the Royal Artillery as 66th (Leeds Rifles, The West Yorkshire Regiment) Anti-Aircraft Brigade.

In 1937, the 6th Battalion became 49th (The West Yorkshire Regiment) Anti-Aircraft Battalion of the Royal Engineers, converting to a searchlight regiment of the Royal Artillery in 1940.

In April 1938, the 7th (Leeds Rifles) Battalion converted to the armoured role as 45th (Leeds Rifles) Bn, Royal Tank Regiment. In June 1939, the company at Morley was split off to form the cadre for a duplicate unit, the 51st (Leeds Rifles) Bn, Royal Tank Regiment.

=== Second World War ===
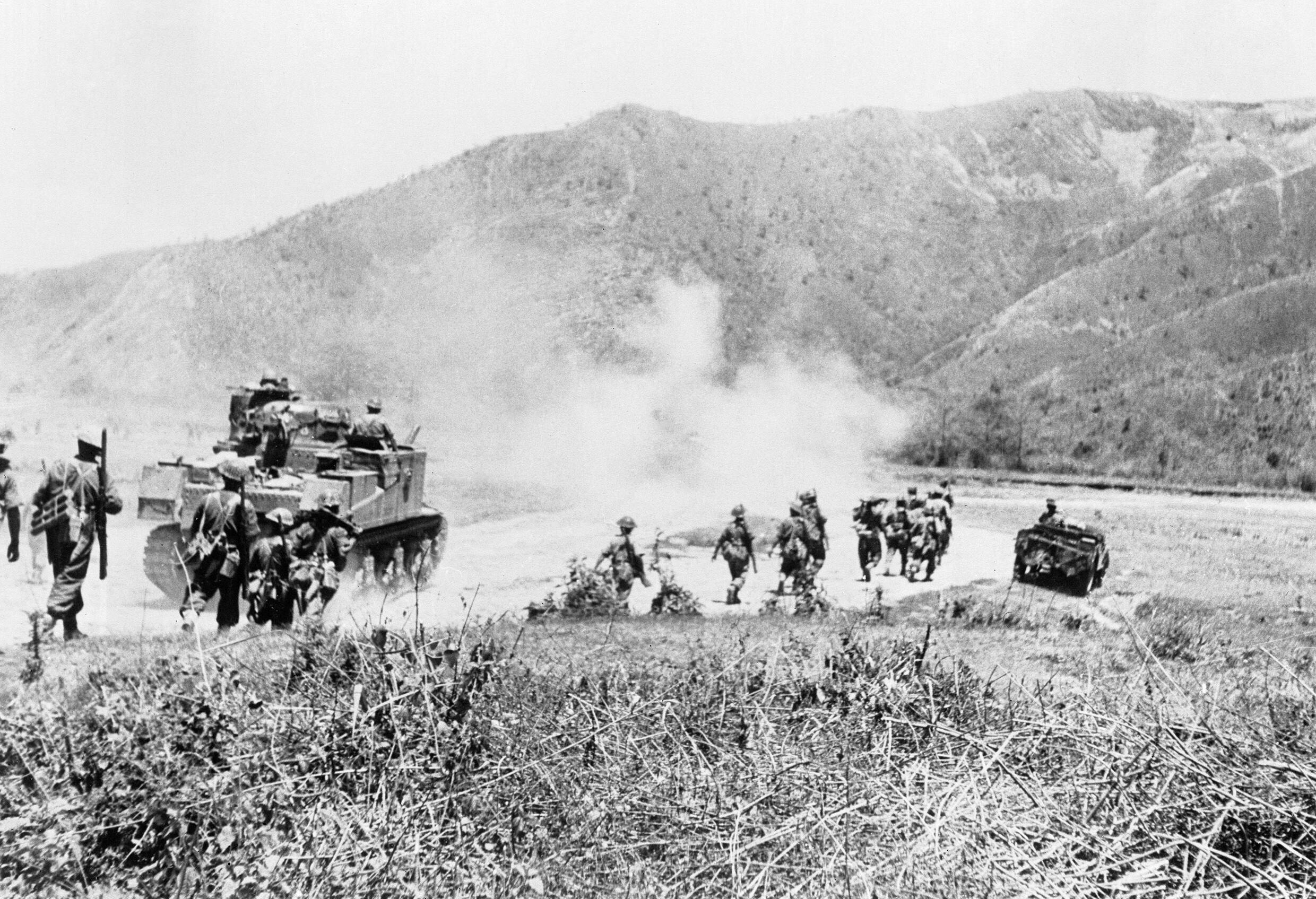
Men of the West Yorkshire Regiment and 10th Gurkha Rifles advance along the Imphal-Kohima road behind Lee-Grant tanks, July 1944

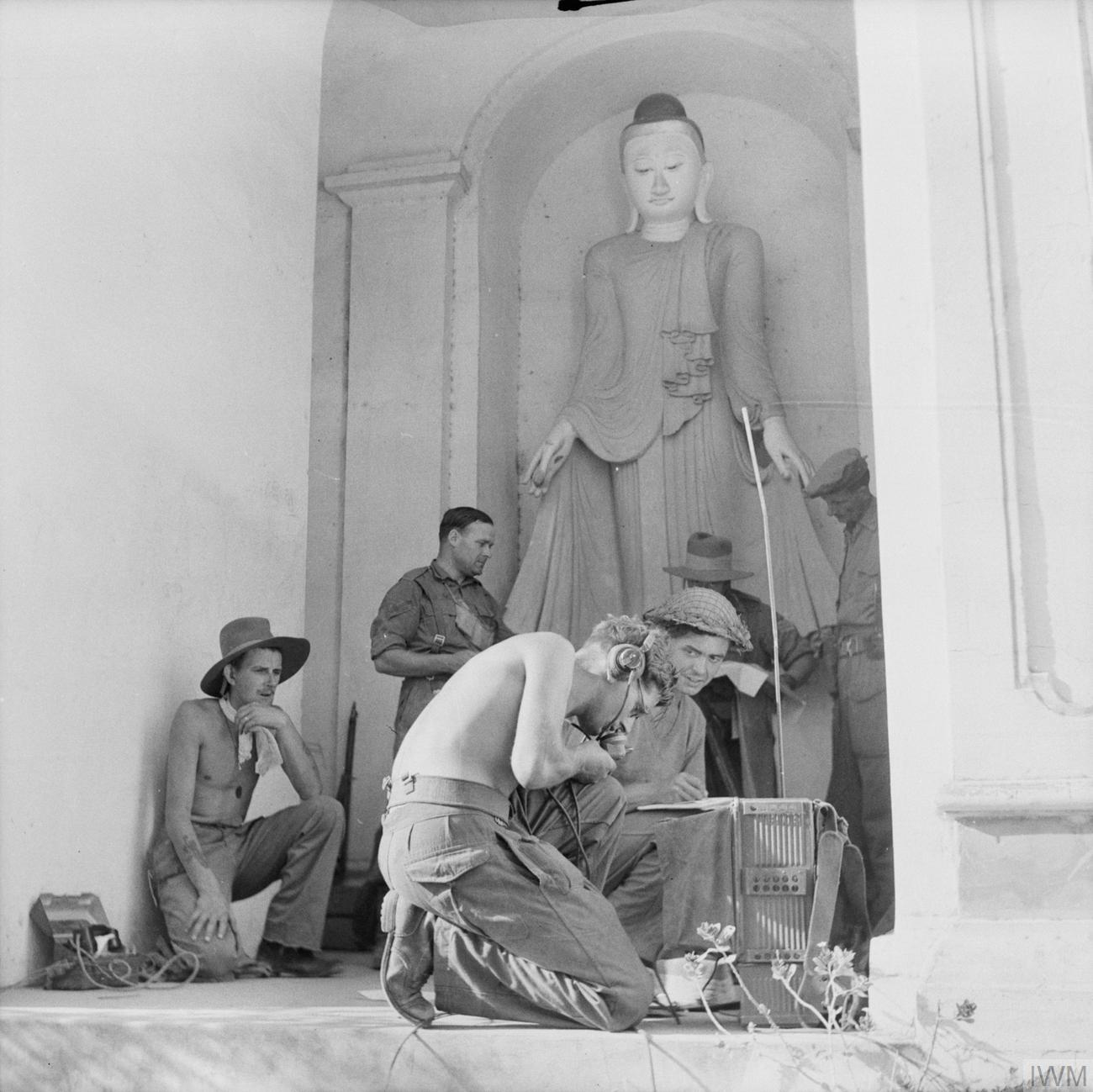
Battalion HQ of 1st West Yorkshire Regiment in a temple near Meiktila, 28 February 1945.

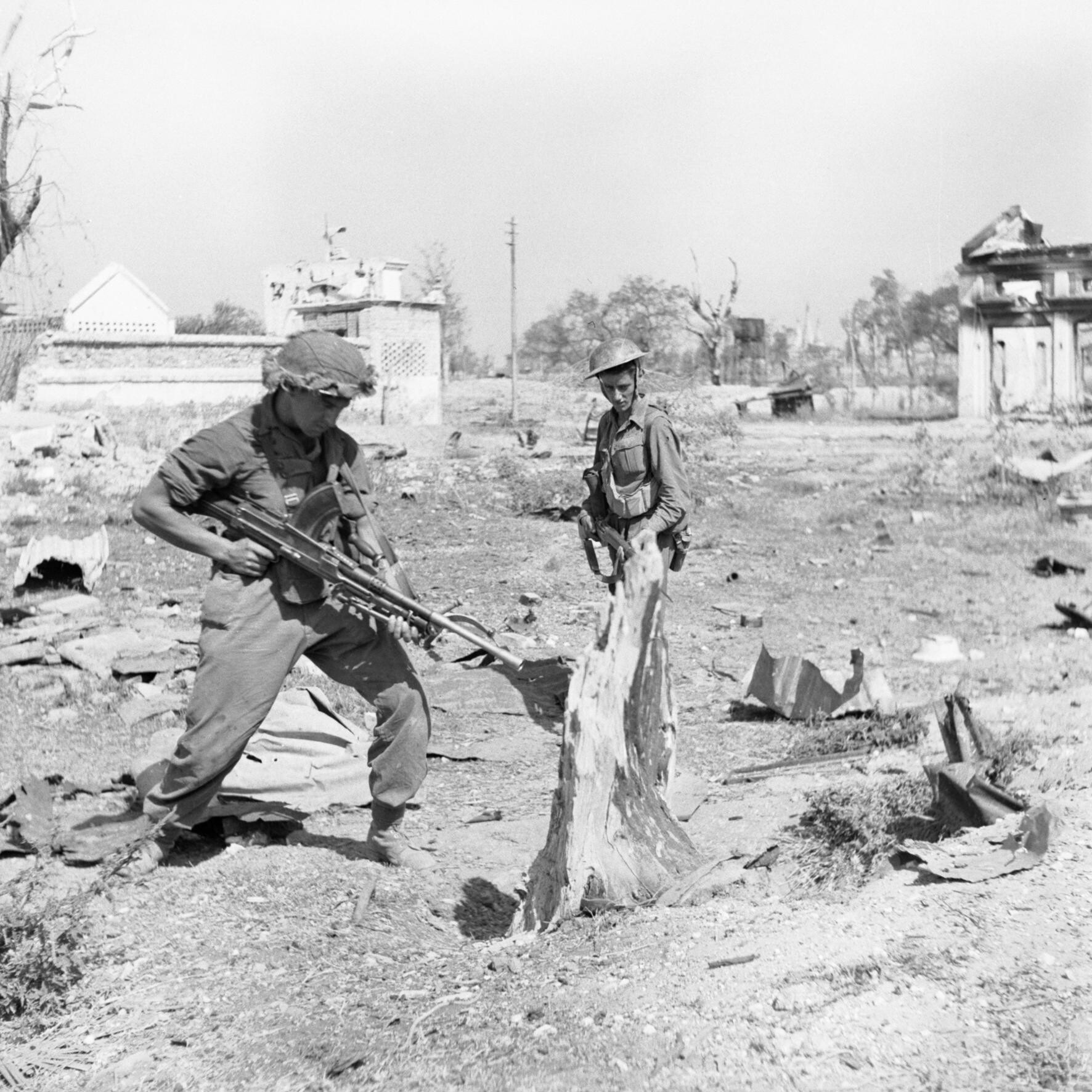
Men of the West Yorkshire Regiment search Japanese dugouts in Meiktila, 28 February 1945.

Both the 1st and 2nd battalions of the West Yorks served in the Far East throughout the Burma Campaign, fighting in the British Fourteenth Army. The 2nd Battalion served with the 9th Indian Infantry Brigade from November 1940.

In 1942, 2/5th Battalion West Yorkshire Regiment was converted to armour, becoming 113th Regiment Royal Armoured Corps. As with all infantry battalions converted in this way, they continued to wear their West Yorkshire cap badge on the black beret of the RAC.

The 11th Battalion formed a garrison in the Falkland Islands from June 1942 to January 1944, when it was relieved by troops of the Royal Scots.

51st (Leeds Rifles) Royal Tank Regiment, formed as a 2nd Line duplicate of 45th (Leeds Rifles) Royal Tank Regiment (previously the 7th (Leeds Rifles) Battalion of the West Yorks), served in 25th Army Tank Brigade in the Italian campaign under the command of Brigadier Noel Tetley of the Leeds Rifles, who was the only Territorial Army RTR officer to command a brigade on active service. The regiment distinguished itself in support of the 1st Canadian Infantry Division in the assault on the Hitler Line in May 1944. At the request of the Canadians, 51 RTR adopted the Maple Leaf as an additional badge, which is still worn by its successors, the Leeds Detachment (Leeds Rifles), Imphal (PWO) Company, The East and West Riding Regiment.

=== Postwar years ===
In 1948, the 1st and 2nd Battalions were amalgamated and were stationed in Austria. They then moved to Egypt and on to Malaya. After a tour of duty in Northern Ireland in 1955–56, the 1st Battalion took part in the Suez Operation and was then stationed in Dover until the amalgamation in July 1958.

In 1956, the merged 45th/51st (Leeds Rifles) RTR returned to the infantry role as 7th (Leeds Rifles) Bn West Yorkshire Regt and in 1961 it re-absorbed the 466th (Leeds Rifles) Light Anti-Aircraft Regt, RA, to form The Leeds Rifles, The Prince of Wales's Own Regiment of Yorkshire.

== Regimental Museum ==
The regimental collection is held by the York Army Museum which is based at the Tower Street drill hall in York.

== Battle honours ==
The regiment's battle honours were as follows:

- Namur 1695, Tournay, Corunna, India, Java, Waterloo, Bhurtpore, Sevastopol, New Zealand, Afghanistan 1879–80, Relief of Ladysmith, South Africa 1899–1902 (South Africa 1900–02 for Volunteer Battalions)
- The Great War [31 battalions]: Aisne 1914 '18, Armentières 1914, Neuve Chapelle, Aubers, Hooge 1915, Loos, Somme 1916 '18, Albert 1916 '18, Bazentin, Pozières, Flers-Courcelette, Morval, Thiepval, Le Transloy, Ancre Heights, Ancre 1916, Arras 1917 '18, Scarpe 1917 '18, Bullecourt, Hill 70, Messines 1917 '18, Ypres 1917 '18, Pilckem, Langemarck 1917, Menin Road, Polygon Wood, Poelcappelle, Passchendaele, Cambrai 1917 '18, St. Quentin, Rosières, Villers Bretonneux, Lys, Hazebrouck, Bailleul, Kemmel, Marne 1918, Tardenois, Amiens, Bapaume 1918, Drocourt-Quéant, Hindenburg Line, Havrincourt, Épéhy, Canal du Nord, Selle, Valenciennes, Sambre, France and Flanders 1914–18, Piave, Vittorio Veneto, Italy 1917–18, Suvla, Landing at Suvla, Scimitar Hill, Gallipoli 1915, Egypt 1915–16
- The Second World War: North-West Europe 1940, Jebel Dafeis, Keren, Ad Teclesan, Abyssinia 1940–41, Cauldron, Defence of Alamein Line, North Africa 1940–42, Pegu 1942, Yenangyaung 1942, North Arakan, Maungdaw, Defence of Sinzweya, Imphal, Bishenpur, Kanglatongbi, Meiktila, Capture of Meiktila, Defence of Meiktila, Rangoon Road, Pyawbwe, Sittang 1945, Burma 1942–45
- 7th Bn (Leeds Rifles) wore a Maple Leaf badge in commemoration of the assault on the Adolf Hitler Line, and bore the badge of the Royal Tank Regiment with dates '1942–45' and two scrolls inscribed 'North Africa' and 'Italy' as an honorary distinction on the colours and appointments.

== Victoria Crosses ==
The following members of the Regiment were awarded the Victoria Cross:

- Captain (later Colonel) Conwyn Mansel-Jones, Second Boer War
- Sergeant William Bernard Traynor, Second Boer War
- Private William Boynton Butler, Great War
- Corporal (later Major) Samuel Meekosha, Great War
- Sergeant Albert Mountain, Great War
- Corporal (later Captain) George Sanders, Great War
- Acting Sergeant Hanson Victor Turner, Second World War

== Colonels-in-Chief ==
- 1947: General HRH The Princess Royal, CI GCVO GBE RRC GCStJ TD

== Colonels of the Regiment ==
Colonels of the regiment included:

- 1685–1688: Lt-Gen. Sir Edward Hales, 3rd Baronet
- 1688–1692: Col. William Beveridge
- 1692–1713: Lt-Gen. John Tidcomb
- 1713–1743: Lt-Gen. Jasper Clayton
- 1743–1747: Brig-Gen. John Price
- 1747–1753: Maj-Gen. Hon. William Herbert

=== 14th Regiment of Foot ===
- 1753–1755: Maj-Gen. Edward Braddock
- 1755–1756: Lt-Gen. Thomas Fowke
- 1756–1765: Maj-Gen. Charles Jeffereys
- 1765–1775: Lt-Gen. Hon. William Keppel
- 1775–1787: Gen. The Rt. Hon. Robert Cuninghame, 1st Baron Rossmore, PC

=== 14th (Bedfordshire) Regiment of Foot ===
- 1787–1789: Lt-Gen. John Douglas
- 1789: Col. George Waldegrave, 4th Earl Waldegrave
- 1789–1806: Gen. George Hotham
- 1806–1826: Gen. Sir Harry Calvert, 1st Baronet, GCB, GCH

=== 14th (Buckinghamshire) Regiment ===
- 1826–1834: Gen. Thomas Graham, 1st Baron Lynedoch, GCB, GCMG
- 1834: Sir Charles Colville, GCB, GCH
- 1835–1837: Gen. Hon. Sir Alexander Hope, GCB
- 1837–1862: Gen. Sir James Watson, KCB
- 1862–1870: Gen. Sir William Wood, KCB, KH
- 1870–1875: Gen. Maurice Barlow, CB
- 1875–1879: Gen. James Webber Smith, CB

=== The 14th (Buckinghamshire) Prince of Wales's Own Regiment ===
- 1879–1880: Gen. Sir Alfred Hastings Horsford, GCB
- 1880–1897: Gen. Alfred Thomas Heyland, CB

=== The Prince of Wales's Own (West Yorkshire Regiment) ===
- 1897–1904: Gen. Sir Martin Andrew Dillon, GCB, CSI
- 1904–1914: Maj-Gen. William Hanbury Hawley
- 1914–1934: Maj-Gen. Sir William Fry, KCVO, CB

=== The West Yorkshire Regiment (The Prince of Wales's Own) ===
- 1934–1947: F.M. Sir Cyril John Deverell, GCB, KBE
- 1947–1956: F.M. Sir William Joseph Slim, 1st Viscount Slim, KG, GCB, GCMG, GCVO, GBE, DSO, MC
- 1956–1958: Brig. Gerald Hilary Cree, CBE, DSO

== Sources ==
- Frederick, J. B. M. (1984). Lineage Book of British Land Forces 1660-1978, Volume II. Wakefield, United Kingdom: Microform Academic Publishers. ISBN 1-85117-008-1.
- Cannon, Richard (1845). Historical Record of the Fourteenth, or, the Buckinghamshire Regiment of Foot. London: Parker, Furnivall, and Parker.
- Forty, George (1998). British Army Handbook 1939–1945. Sutton Publishing. ISBN 0-7509-1403-3.
- Knollenberg, Bernhard (1975). Growth of the American Revolution, 1766–1775. New York: Free Press. ISBN 978-0-02-917110-3. OCLC 1416300.
- Russell, David Lee (2000). The American Revolution in the Southern colonies. Jefferson, NC: McFarland. ISBN 978-0-7864-0783-5. OCLC 248087936.
