= Fulford, North Yorkshire =

Village and civil parish in North Yorkshire, England

Coordinates: 53.938000°N 1.073000°W

Fulford
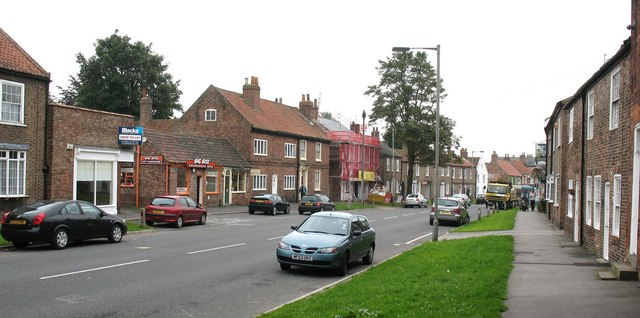
- Main Street, Fulford

- Location within North Yorkshire
- Population: 2,785 (2011 census)
- OS grid reference: SE608495
  - London: 175 mi (282 km) S
- Civil parish: Fulford
- Unitary authority: York
- Ceremonial county: North Yorkshire
- Region: Yorkshire and the Humber
- Country: England
- Sovereign state: United Kingdom
- Post town: YORK
- Postcode district: YO10, YO19
- Police: North Yorkshire
- Fire: North Yorkshire
- Ambulance: Yorkshire
- UK Parliament: York Outer
- Website: www.fulfordpc.org.uk

Fulford is a historic village and civil parish on the outskirts of York, within the York district, in the ceremonial county of North Yorkshire, England. It is located 2 miles (3 km) to the south of the city, on the east bank of the River Ouse.

The population of the civil parish at the 2011 census was 2,785. It is home to Imphal Barracks, headquarters of the British Army's 15th Infantry Brigade; soldiers and their families live in married quarters outside the barracks. Fulford is a headquarters for the Royal Military Police.

Fulford was the site of the Battle of Fulford won by the invading Vikings in 1066, a precursor to the nearby Battle of Stamford Bridge lost by the Vikings, and then the Battle of Hastings in Sussex won by the invading Normans in the following weeks.

== History ==
St Oswald's Hall, the former church, was built about 1150, on a site near the Ouse, west of the current village centre. A new St Oswald's Church was built, on a different site, in 1866, and the old church also survives.

Cavalry barracks were established in Fulford as early as 1795 but these have now been largely demolished. The infantry barracks, now known as Imphal Barracks were built between 1877 and 1880.

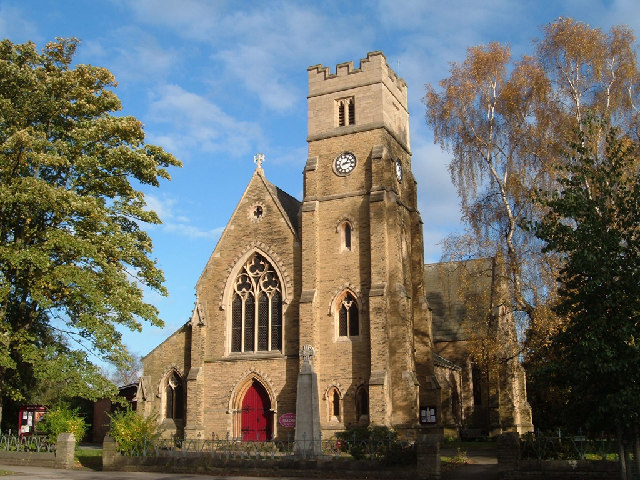
St Oswald's Church

Fulford Cross, a 15th-century Grade II listed boundary cross stands opposite the barracks, beyond the present parish boundary. The cross has been removed, but an octagonal shaft on a three-stepped pedestal remains.

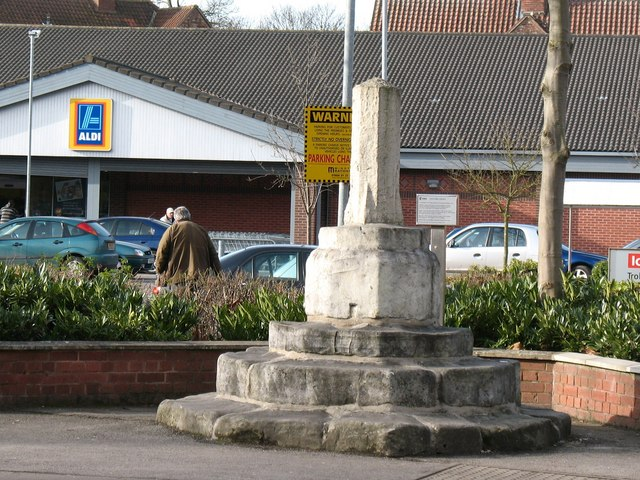
Fulford Cross

In 1823 Fulford, known as "Fulford Gate", was a village in the parish of Fulford Ambo in the East Riding of Yorkshire and the Wapentake of Ouse and Derwent. Population at the time was 182, with occupations including two farmers, two blacksmiths, two wheelwrights, two shoemakers, a butcher, a tailor, a shopkeeper, a coal dealer, a corn miller, and the landlords of The Light Horseman, The Saddle, The Board, The Plough, and The Bay Horse public houses. Also within the village was a druggist, a manufacturing chemist, a schoolmaster, nine gentlemen, three gentlewomen, two bankers and seven yeomen. A school existed for 20 boys and girls. Within the parish of Fulford Ambo, and 1 mile (1.6 km) to the south of Fulford Gate, was the settlement of Fulford Water, with a population of 35 which included three farmers, and a gentleman at the Hall.

The ancient parish of Fulford consisted of two townships, Gate Fulford (also known as Over Fulford) in the north and Water Fulford (also known as Nether Fulford) to the south. From the two townships the parish took the name of Fulfords Ambo in the 19th century. The two townships became separate civil parishes in 1866. In 1900 the civil parish of Gate Fulford was abolished and absorbed into the city of York. The civil parish of Water Fulford was renamed Fulford in 1935.

In 1974 Fulford was transferred from the East Riding of Yorkshire to Selby District in the new county of North Yorkshire. In 1996 the parish was transferred to the City of York unitary authority.

== Geography and governance ==
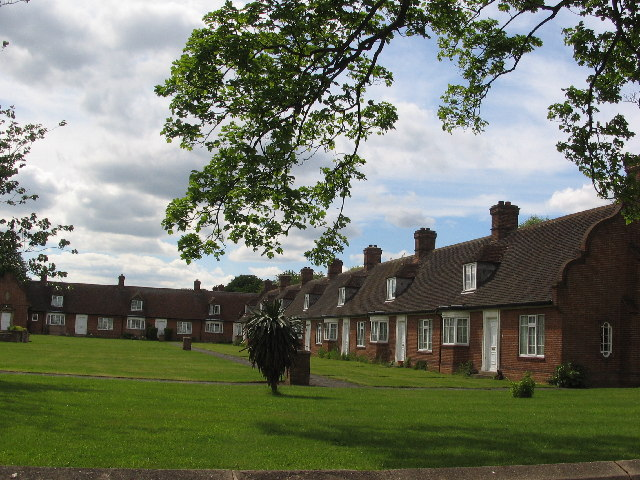
Almshouses in Fulford

According to the 2001 Census the parish had a population of 2,595. The modern village incorporates the old settlements of Water Fulford to the south and Gate Fulford on the road to York. The current civil parish is co-terminous with the unitary authority ward boundary. The parish is much reduced in size, having once extended north up the A19 past Fulford Barracks as far as Heslington Road and including York Cemetery. Between Fulford and the university is Walmgate Stray. Low-lying land near the River Ouse is prone to flooding.

The parish council maintains a website with local information which includes a directory of organisations and shops, a list of links and contact details for services, a guide to local issues and a record of parish council minutes.

== Education ==
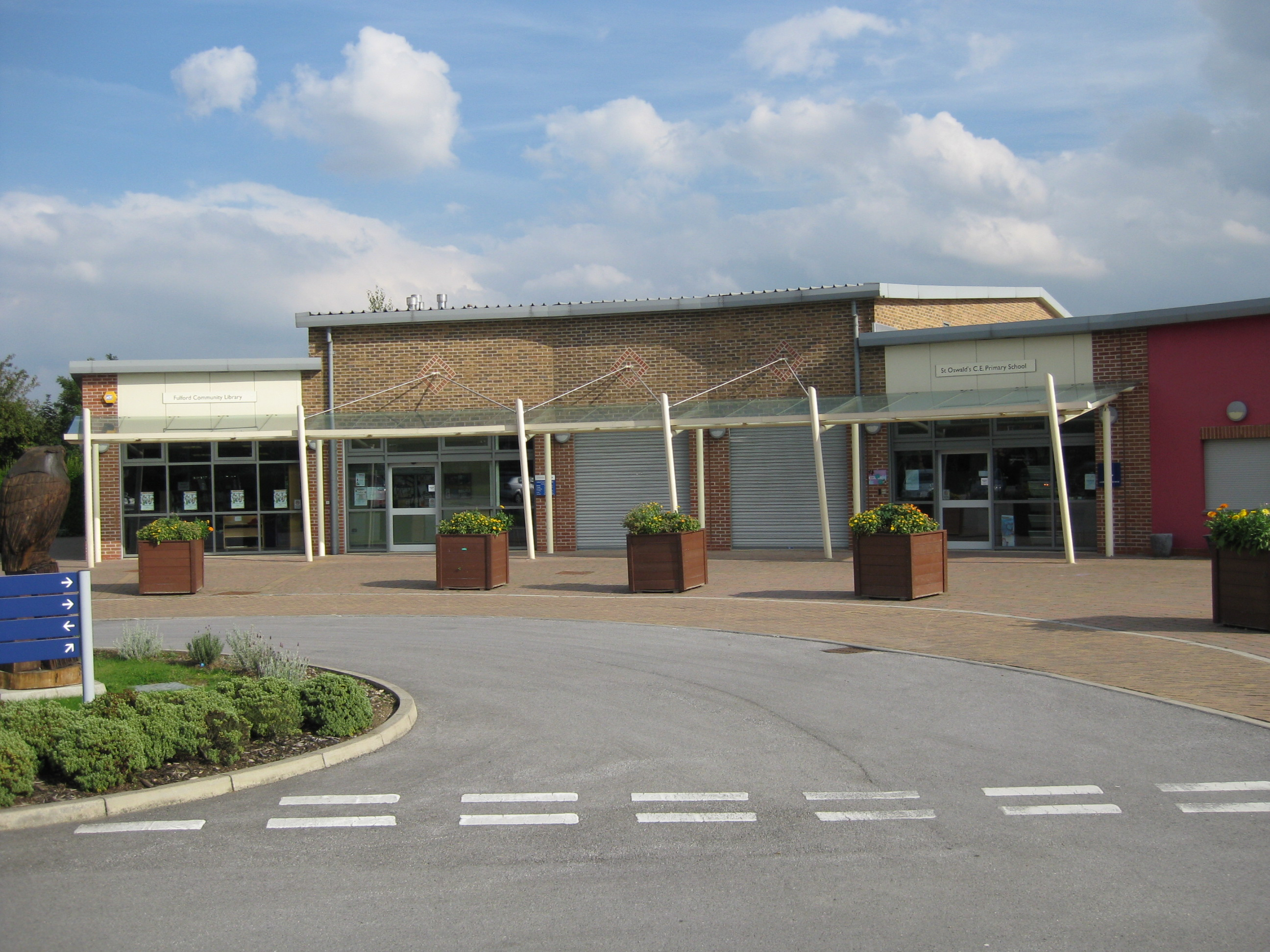
St Oswald's Primary School

Schools in the area include St. Oswald's Primary School and Fulford School, a Mathematics and Computing College.

== Transport ==
Fulford main street is the A19. Near the intersection stands the York Designer Outlet shopping mall. A pedestrian Millennium Bridge with a cycle path was opened in 2001, linking Fulford to the South Bank area of York on the other side of the river. Several bus services operate between York and Fulford.

== Sport ==
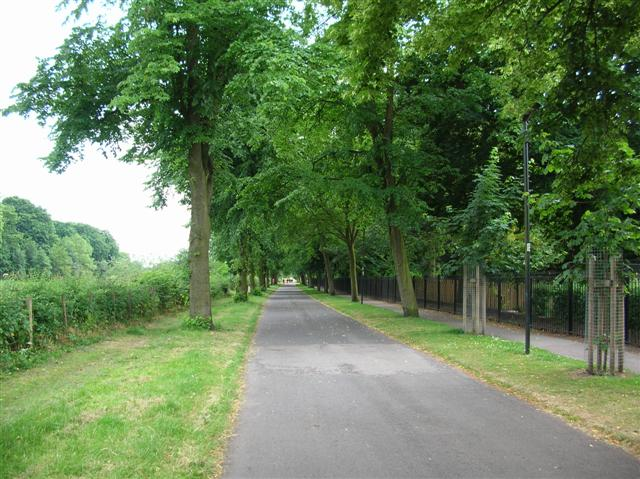
White Rose cycle route

Fulford Golf Club, which celebrated its centenary in 2006, was home to the Benson and Hedges International Open between 1971 and 1989. During the 1981 tournament, Bernard Langer climbed 20 feet (6.1 m) up an ash tree by the 17th green to play his third shot. York City F.C. were once based in Fulford, at their Fulfordgate stadium, before moving to Bootham Crescent in 1932. The area is now occupied by Eastward Avenue and lies close to Fulford School.

A 6.4 miles (10.3 km) long scale model of the Solar System starts across the Ouse, west of Fulford, and runs via Naburn to Riccall along a disused railway line from York to Selby, now a Sustrans cycle path and part of the White Rose cycle route.

Besides having the Minster Way and the Wilberforce Way, the route of the White Rose Way, a long-distance walk from Leeds to Scarborough also passes through Fulford.

== Notable people ==
- Annie Coultate – teacher and leading suffragist in York
- Steve McClaren – former England football manager, was born in Fulford.

== See also ==
- Listed buildings in Fulford, North Yorkshire

== Gallery ==
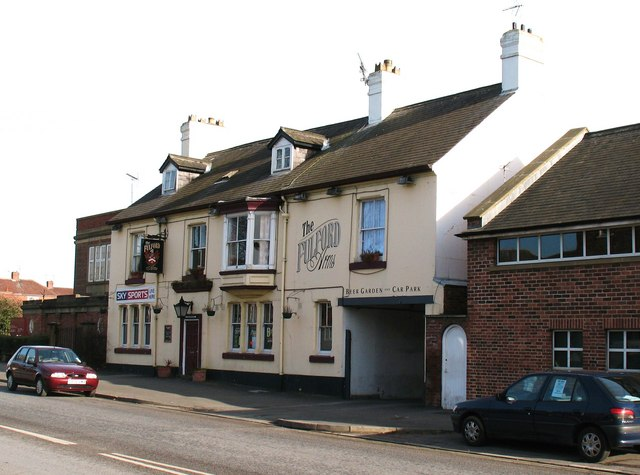
The Fulford Arms

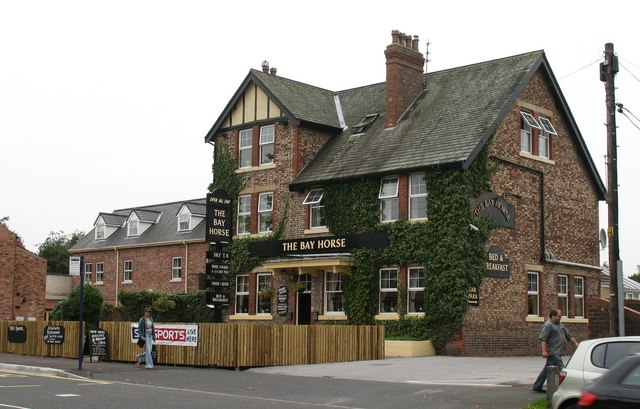
The Bay Horse

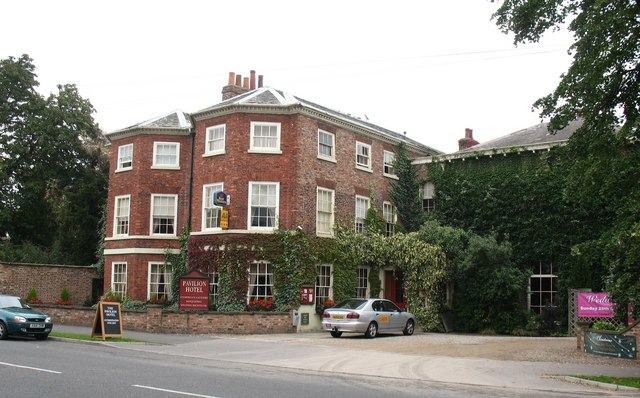
Pavilion Hotel

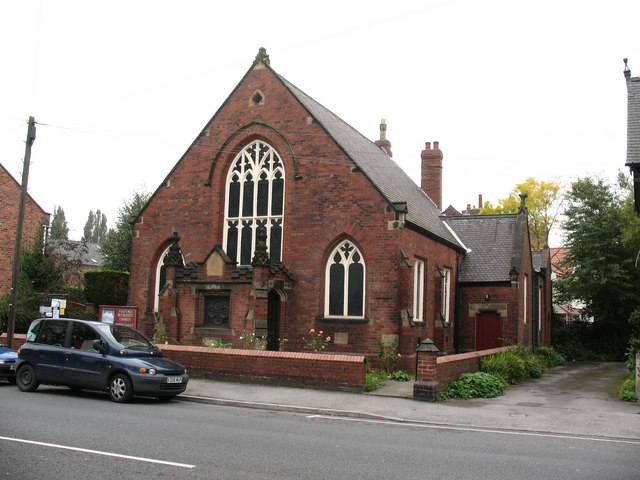
Fulford Methodist Church

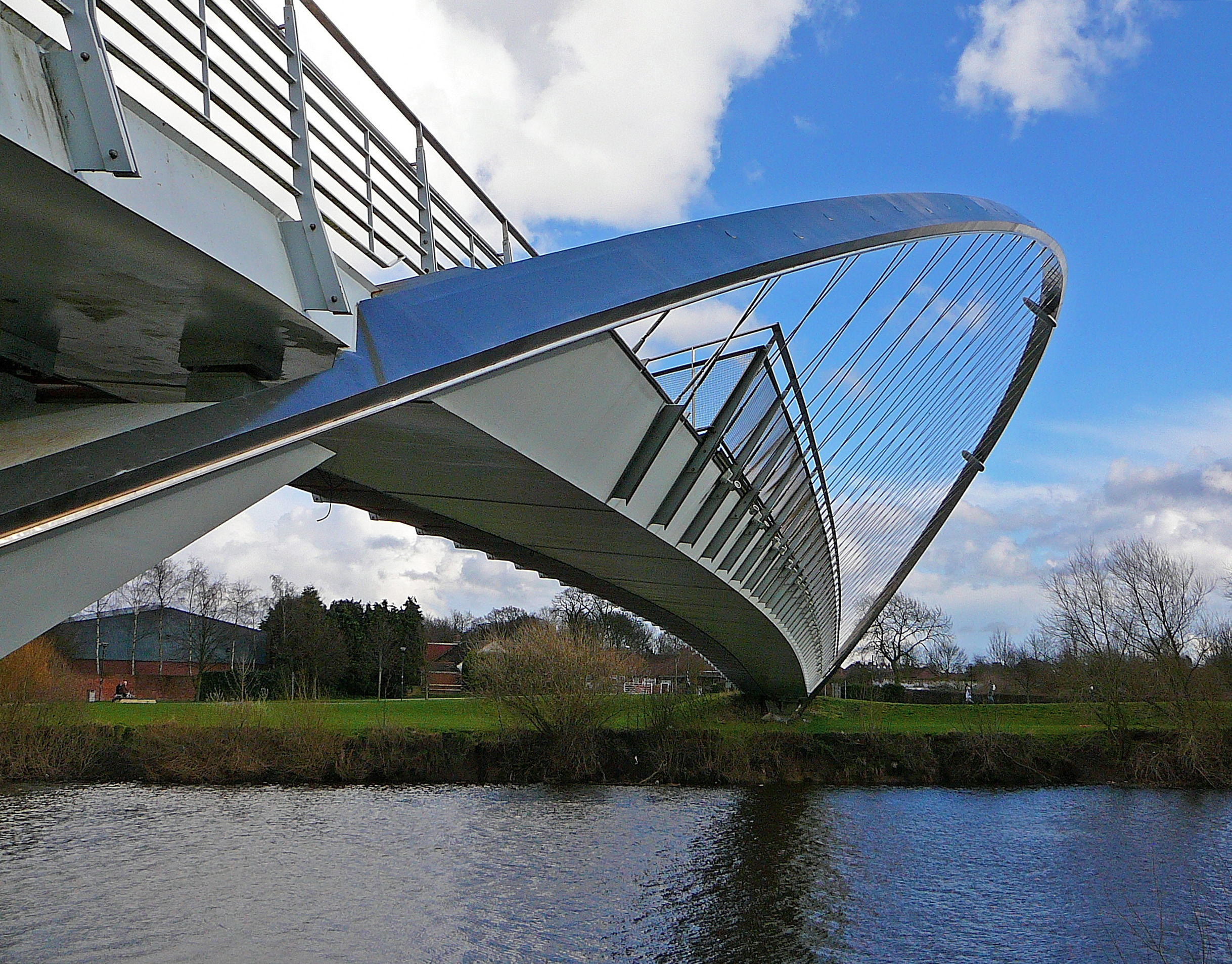
Millennium Bridge

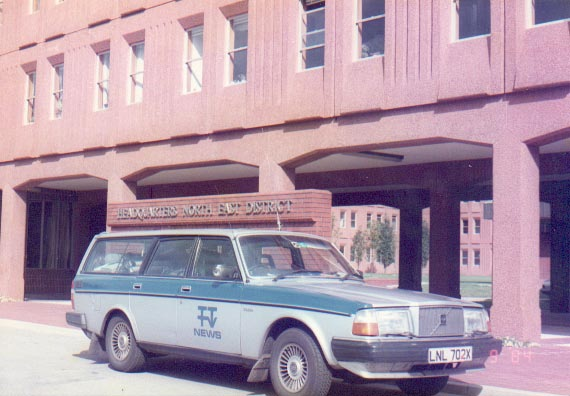
Imphal Barracks
