= Imphal Barracks =

Military building in York, England

- York
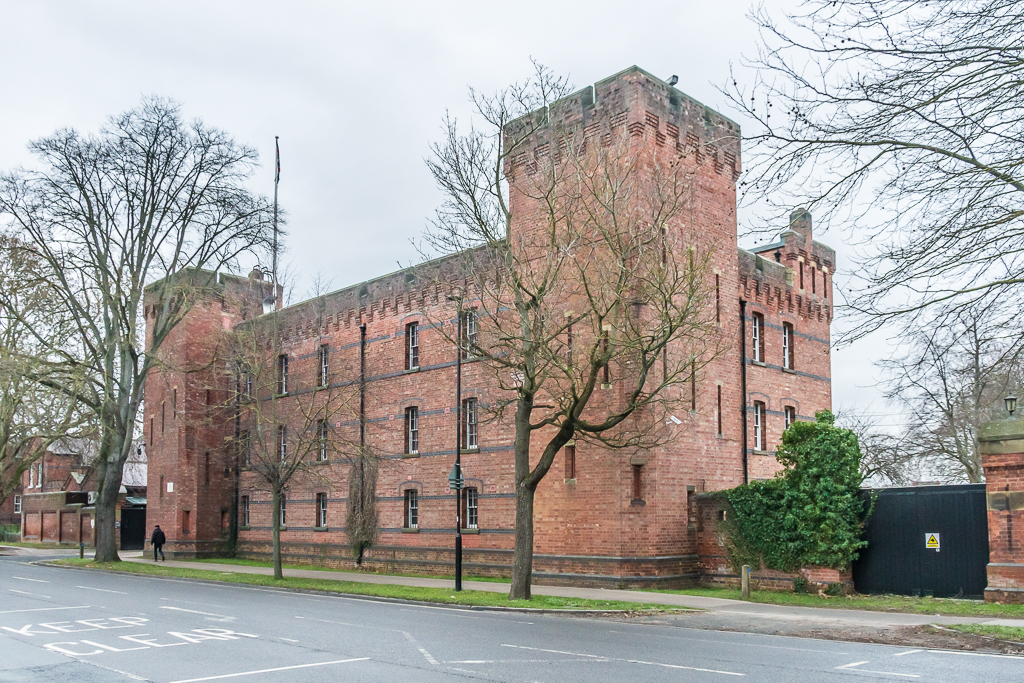
- The keep in 2023

Site information
- Type: Barracks
- Owner: Ministry of Defence
- Operator: British Army

Location
- Location within North Yorkshire
- Coordinates: 53°56′37″N 01°04′26″W

Site history
- Built: 1877–78
- Built for: War Office
- In use: 1878–present

Garrison information
- Occupants: Headquarters 1st (UK) Division Headquarters 19th Light Brigade 2nd Signal Regiment

Listed Building – Grade II
- Official name: Imphal Barracks the Keep
- Designated: 24 June 1983
- Reference no.: 1257808

Imphal Barracks is a military installation located in Fulford, a village on the outskirts of York, England.

== History ==
=== Early history ===
Cavalry barracks were built in Fulford as part of the British response to the threat of the French Revolution and were completed in 1795, but these have now been largely demolished. The infantry barracks, which were built between 1877 and 1878, were initially the depot of the 14th Regiment of Foot who arrived from Bradford Moor Barracks in 1878. Their creation took place as part of the Cardwell Reforms which encouraged the localisation of British military forces. Following the Childers Reforms, the 14th Regiment of Foot evolved to become the West Yorkshire Regiment with its depot at the barracks in 1881. Under the Cardwell Reforms the two battalions of the 25th (Sussex) Regiment of Foot also established a depot at the barracks but following the Childers Reforms that regiment evolved to become the King's Own Scottish Borderers and moved to Berwick Barracks in 1881.

=== Post Second World War ===
In the 1950s, the barracks were renamed Imphal Barracks to reflect the battle honours won by the West Yorkshire Regiment at the Battle of Imphal in spring 1944 during the Second World War. The barracks became the home of the Prince of Wales's Own Regiment of Yorkshire when the West Yorkshire Regiment amalgamated with the East Yorkshire Regiment in 1958.

The barracks also became the home of Northern Command in 1958. North East District was established at the barracks in 1967 and Northern Command was disbanded in 1972; the barracks additionally became the home of 2nd Division in 1982. On 24 June 1983, the keep of the barracks was designated a Grade II listed building. North East District merged with Eastern District to form an enlarged Eastern District at Imphal Barracks in 1992. The enlarged district was disbanded on the formation of HQ Land Command in 1995. 2nd Division, having absorbed Scotland District, moved its headquarters to Craigiehall, near Edinburgh in April 2000.

=== 21st century ===
In June 2006, a ceremony celebrating the formation of the Yorkshire Regiment was held at Imphal Barracks. The new divisional headquarters of 6th Division marked its formation with a parade and flag presentation at Imphal Barracks on 5 August 2008. It had a clear focus on preparing brigades for Afghanistan: during summer 2009, the divisional headquarters was significantly reinforced and transformed into Combined Joint Task Force 6 before deploying to Afghanistan as Regional Command South in November 2009. The 6th division headquarters closed in April 2011.

Imphal Barracks was the home of 15th Infantry Brigade until 1 December 2014 when it merged with the former 4th Mechanised Brigade to form an infantry brigade known as 4th Infantry Brigade and Headquarters North East based in Catterick. The barracks became headquarters of the 1st (United Kingdom) Division on 1 June 2015.

== Future ==
In November 2016, the Ministry of Defence announced that the site would close in 2031. This was later brought forward to 2030.

== Current units ==
Current units at the site are:

- Headquarters 1st (UK) Division
- Headquarters 19th Light Brigade
- 2nd Signal Regiment, Royal Corps of Signals
- 12 Military Intelligence Company, 1 Military Intelligence Battalion
- Kohima Troop, 37 Signal Regiment
- 3 AEC Gp (York), ETS

== Narrow gauge railway ==
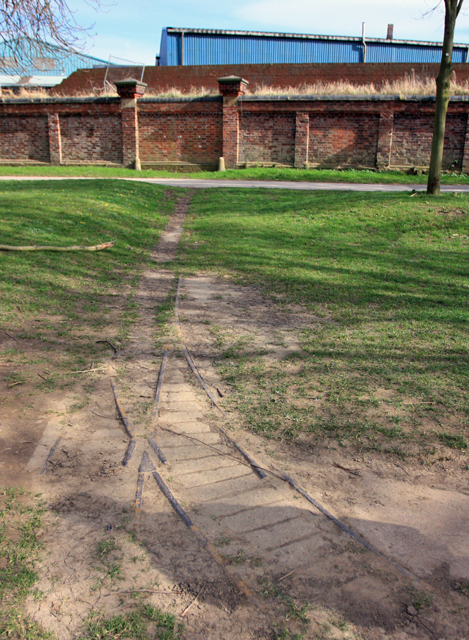
Fragment of the narrow gauge railway line just upstream from the Millennium Bridge

A horse-drawn narrow gauge railway with a gauge of 18 inch (457 mm) ran from the Ordnance Wharf at the River Ouse parallel to Hospital Fields Road to the army depot. Military supplies and explosives were delivered by the schooner Princess, known locally as the "Powder boat".

== See also ==
- Listed buildings in York (outside the city walls, southern part)
