= Listed buildings in Fulford, North Yorkshire =

Fulford is a civil parish in the unitary authority of the City of York, North Yorkshire, England. It contains 20 listed buildings that are recorded in the National Heritage List for England. Of these, one is listed at Grade II*, the middle of the three grades, and the others are at Grade II, the lowest grade. The parish contains the village of Fulford and the surrounding area. Most of the listed buildings are houses and associated structures, and the others consist of two churches, one redundant, with items in its former churchyard, and a telephone kiosk.

== Key ==
Grade	Criteria
II*	Particularly important buildings of more than special interest
II	Buildings of national importance and special interest

== Buildings ==
Name and location	Photograph	Date	Notes	Grade
Coffin lid 53.93934°N 1.08090°W		Roman {possible)	The coffin lid in the grounds of St Oswald's Hall is in millstone grit. It has an oblong plan with a raised spine, and measures about 1 metre (3 ft 3 in) by 2.5 metres (8 ft 2 in).	II
Fulford Hall; 53.92847°N 1.07641°W		11th century (possible)	The house, which has been altered and extended through the centuries, has a partly exposed core in magnesian limestone, and is otherwise in pinkish-orange brick, with dressings in red brick and sandstone, quoins, a four-course floor band, a dentilled eaves band, and a tile roof. There are two storeys and a front of ten bays. The porch is in Tudor style with a round-arched opening under a heraldic motif, a cornice and a low parapet. Most of the windows are sashes under flat arches of red rubbed brick, and there is a staircase window with under a round arch and with quoined jambs.	II
St Oswald's Hall; 53.93942°N 1.08102°W		Early 12th century	Originally a church, the tower was added in 1795, the church was declared redundant in 1973, and later converted into a private house. It is built in magnesian limestone, the tower is in pinkish-red brick, and the roof is tiled. The building consists of a three-bay nave, a two-bay chancel and a west tower. The tower has three stages, a plinth, quoins, a three-light west window, and a pyramidal roof. On the north side is an octagonal stair turret. The south entrance has a round-arched opening with chamfered voussoirs and chamfered jambs.	II*
Dovecote to Garden House, Fulford Hall; 53.92817°N 1.07461°W		Early to mid-18th century	The dovecote is in orange brick with a hipped slate roof. There is a square plan, and it contains a central entrance, and a casement window on the right side. On the roof is a wooden cupola with a weathervane. The interior is lined with brick nesting boxes.	II
Gates and piers, Fulford Hall; 53.92780°N 1.07524°W		Early to mid-18th century	The gate piers are in magnesian limestone, they have a square plan, they are rusticated, and are about 2 metres (6 ft 7 in) in height. Each pier has a cornice and an ogival cap. The gates are in wrought iron, and have bars surmounted by finials and a scrollwork lock rail.	II
17 York Road; 53.93747°N 1.07307°W		1737	The house is in pinkish-brown brick with a Welsh slate roof. There are two storeys and three bays. The central doorway has attached Doric columns, a radial fanlight, a frieze and a hood, and on the extreme right is a passage doorway under a cambered arch. On the left bay is a full-height bow window with tripartite sash windows, and the other windows are sashes with wedge lintels.	II
6 and 8 York Road; 53.93733°N 1.0734°W		Mid-18th century	The house, later divided into two, in pinkish-brown brick, with a floor band, a dentilled eaves cornice, and a pantile roof with brick coping on the left gable. There are two storeys and three bays. On the left is a carriage entrance, to the right are two doorways, the right doorway with a fanlight under an elliptical arch. The windows are sashes.	II
Cart house, stables and wall, Fulford Hall; 53.92783°N 1.07577°W	—	Mid-18th century	The cart house and stables are in pinkish-orange brick, with magnesian limestone dressings, a stepped eaves band, and a pantile roof with brick coping to the gable ends. There is a single tall storey and three bays. In the centre is a cart entrance with an elliptical arch, imposts and a keystone, and is flanked by doorways, one with a fanlight. The wall has stone coping and ramped ends, it is about 2.5 metres (8 ft 2 in) in height, and extends for about 12 metres (39 ft).	II
Fulford House; 53.93639°N 1.07214°W		Mid-18th century	The house, that was later extended and subsequently converted into a hotel, is in pinkish-brown brick, the front in reddish-brown brick, with dressings in stone and brick, on a stone plinth, with sill and floor bands, a double-dentilled cornice and a hipped Welsh slate roof. There are three storeys, and two full-height canted bays on the front. The entrance is on the left side and has a hood on wrought iron scrolled brackets. The windows are sashes under flat arches of gauged brick. On the left side is a wrought iron trellis verandah.	II
30 and 32 York Road; 53.93555°N 1.07210°W		Mid to late 18th century	The house, later divided into two, is in pinkish-brown brick, with red brick dressings, quoins, a three-course floor band and a pantile roof. There are two storeys and two bays. The doorway on the right has a divided fanlight, to its left is a bow window on each floor, and on the left bay are sashes, the ground window under an elliptical arch.	II
Stables, Fulford Hall; 53.92806°N 1.07616°W		Mid to late 18th century	The stables are in orange-red brick, with dressings in red brick and magnesian limestone, quoins, a floor band, and a pantile roof with stone copings. There are two storeys, a projecting central bay and three-bay wings. The stable contains elliptical-arched openings, that in the centre with moulded impost blocks and a keystone.	II
Delwood Croft; 53.93482°N 1.07335°W		Late 18th century	The house, that was remodelled in the 19th century, is rendered and colourwashed, with sill bands, a cogged eaves band, and a hipped Welsh slate roof. The garden front has three storeys and three bays, the outer two bays canted, and a two-storey canted bay on the left. The entrance is on the side and has a Doric portico with a frieze and a dentilled cornice, and a doorway with a radial fanlight. The windows are sashes, some with fluted wedge lintels and keystones. The original entrance in the centre of the garden front has been converted into a sash window with a frieze and a hood.	II
Holly House and The Old Manor House; 53.93669°N 1.07240°W		Late 18th century	The house, later divided into two, is in pinkish-brown brick, on a plinth, with stone dressings, sill bands, and a roof of pantile at the front and stone slate at the rear. There are three storeys and three bays. The central doorway has slender pilasters, a radial fanlight and a pediment, and is flanked by two-storey canted bay windows. The other windows on the front are sashes, with flat arches of rubbed brick on the left, and under replacement soldier arches on the right. Elsewhere, there are staircase windows with radial glazing bars at the heads.	II
The Old House; 53.93744°N 1.07353°W		Late 18th century	The house is in pinkish-brown brick, with dressings in red gauged brick, four-course floor bands, a dentilled cornice and a Welsh slate roof. There are three storeys and five bays. The central doorway has attached columns, a fanlight with radial glazing, and an open dentilled pediment. The windows are sashes with stone sills and flat arches of gauged red brick.	II
Memorial; 53.93938°N 1.08094°W	—	c. 1780	The memorial to the south of St Oswald's Hall is in magnesian limestone. It consists of an oblong slab measuring about 1 metre (3 ft 3 in) by 2 metres (6 ft 7 in) on six vase-shaped legs.	II
19 York Road; 53.93739°N 1.07301°W		Early 19th century	The house is in pinkish-brown brick with a Welsh slate roof. There are two storeys and three bays. The doorway on the right has a Doric doorcase with a frieze and a hood, and a doorway with a patterned fanlight, and on the left is a doorway with a divided fanlight and a wedge lintel. In the centre is a full-height bow window with tripartite sash windows, and the other windows are sashes with wedge lintels.	II
The Cottage; 53.93942°N 1.07676°W		Early 19th century	The house is in pinkish-brown brick with a swept tile roof. There is a single storey and three bays. The doorway has pilasters, and a round-arched fanlight with Gothick glazing. It is flanked by round-arched windows with radial glazing.	II
The White House; 53.93686°N 1.07306°W		Early 19th century	The house, later divided into three, is in colourwashed render, with a floor band, a dentilled cornice, and hipped Welsh slate roofs. There are two storeys and five bays, the middle three bays projecting slightly. The central doorway has fluted pilasters, a radial fanlight and a dentilled frieze on consoles. The windows are sashes, tripartite on the ground floor, and two upper floor windows have wrought iron balconies.	II
St Oswald's Church; 53.93839°N 1.07307°W		1877–78	The church was designed by James Pigott Pritchett Jr, the vestry was added in 1875, and the spire was removed in 1923–24 by Walter Brierley. It is built in sandstone with a Welsh slate roof, and consists of a nave with a clerestory, north and south aisles, north and south transepts, a chancel with a south vestry, chapel and organ chamber, and a southwest tower. The tower has five stages, a plinth, angle buttresses, a pointed south doorway, paired lancet windows on the west side, two-light windows, clock faces, two-light bell openings, and an embattled parapet.	II
Telephone kiosk 53.93586°N 1.07192°W		1935	The telephone kiosk is of the K6 type designed by Giles Gilbert Scott. Constructed in cast iron with a square plan and a dome, it has three unperforated crowns in the top panels.	II
