= William Traynor =

Recipient of the Victoria Cross (1870–1954)

William Bernard Traynor VC
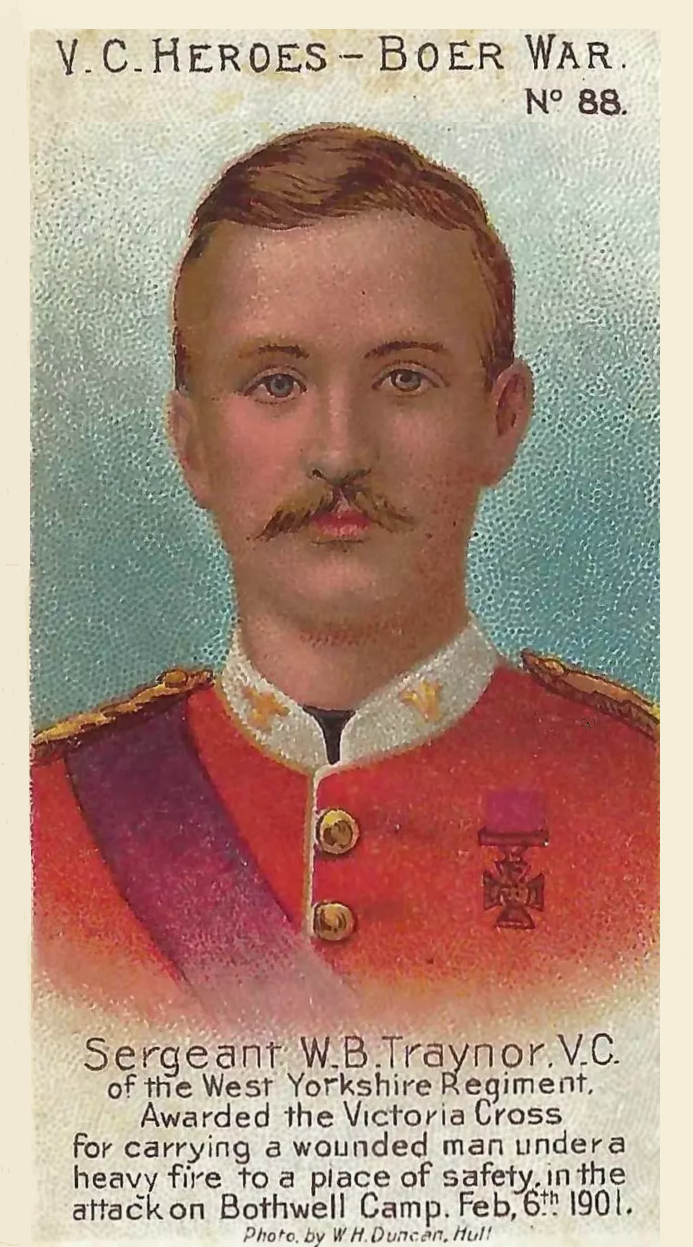
- Traynor depicted on a cigarette card
- Born: 31 December 1870; Hull, East Riding of Yorkshire
- Died: 20 October 1954 (aged 83); Dover, Kent
- Burial place: Charlton Cemetery, Dover
- Military career
- Allegiance: United Kingdom
- Branch: British Army
- Service years: 1888-1901
- Rank: Sergeant
- Units: The West Yorkshire Regiment
- Conflicts: Second Boer War; World War I
- Awards: Victoria Cross

For the Canadian-American political activist, see W. J. H. Traynor

William Bernard Traynor VC (31 December 1870 – 20 October 1954) was an English recipient of the Victoria Cross, the highest and most prestigious award for gallantry in the face of the enemy that can be awarded to British and Commonwealth forces.

== Details ==
Traynor was born at 29 Moxon Street, Hull, East Riding of Yorkshire. He joined the West Yorkshire Regiment in November 1888 and served in India and, from October 1899, in South Africa.

He was a 30 year old sergeant in the 2nd Battalion, The West Yorkshire Regiment (The Prince of Wales's Own), British Army during the Second Boer War when the following act led to the award of the Victoria Cross:

During the night attack on Bothwell Camp on the 6th February, 1901, Sergeant Traynor jumped out of a trench and ran out under an extremely heavy fire to the assistance of a wounded man. While running out he was severely wounded, and being unable to carry the man by himself he called for assistance. Lance-Corporal Lintott at once came to him and between them they carried the wounded soldier into shelter. After this, although severely wounded, Sergeant Traynor remained in command of his section, and was most cheerful, encouraging his men till the attack failed.

Lance-Corporal Lintott was awarded the Distinguished Conduct Medal for the same action.

In September 1901 Traynor was discharged from the Army as medically unfit for further service. Settling in Dover in Kent in 1902, he served as a civilian orderly room clerk, then a barrack warden, until he retired in 1935.

Traynor was a member of the Dover branch of the British Legion, serving as its vice chairman for 10 years. He also served on Whitfield Parish Council and was a Freemason.

Traynor died on 20 October 1954 at Buckland Hospital in Dover aged 83, and is buried at Charlton Cemetery, Dover.

Traynor's medals, including his Victoria Cross, are held at the Lord Ashcroft Gallery at the Imperial War Museum, London.

== Bibliography ==
- Monuments to Courage (David Harvey, 1999)
- The Register of the Victoria Cross (This England, 1997)
- Victoria Crosses of the Anglo-Boer War (Ian Uys, 2000)
