= St Oswald's Hall =

Grade II* listed building in York, England

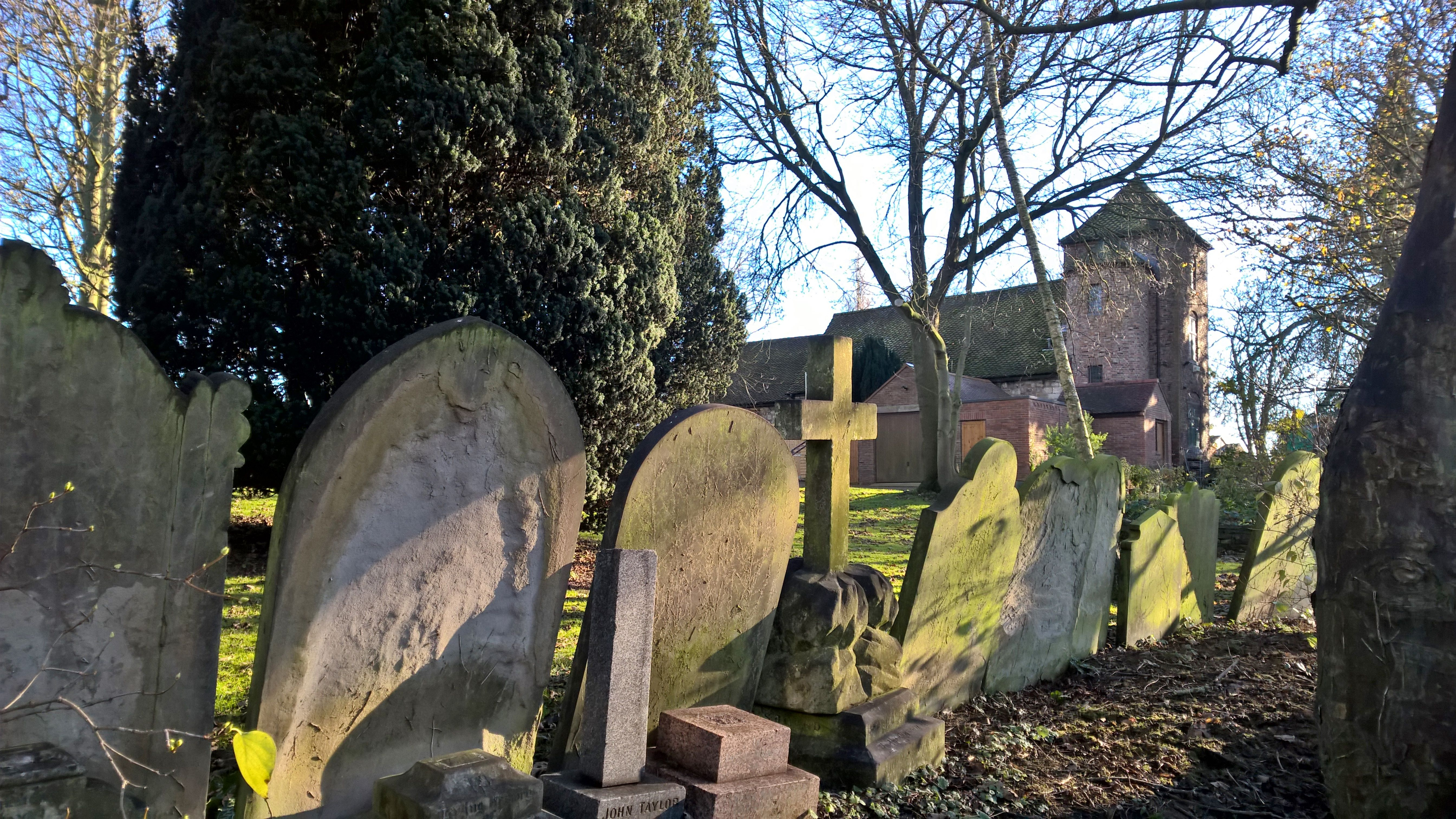
- The hall, in 2017

General information
- Location: Fulford, York, England
- Coordinates: 53.9394°N 1.0810°W
- Year built: 12th century
- Renovated: 1795, 19th century, 1980

Technical details
- Material: Stone

Design and construction
- Designations

Listed Building – Grade II*
- Official name: Saint Oswald's Hall
- Designated: 17 January 1973
- Reference no.: 1316301

St Oswald's Hall is a Grade II* listed former church in Fulford, in south-eastern York, in England.

The church lies west of the main part of Fulford, near the River Ouse. It is possible that this was the original site of the village, which is now centred on the main road.

The church was built in the 12th century, a small building of stone from Tadcaster. The nave has been tentatively dated to about 1150, and the chancel to around 1180. The south door and windows on the north side of the chancel are original, while the east window dates from the 14th century, and the southern windows are 17th-century. The church originally had a steeple, but already in 1577 it was recorded as being "in decay", and it was later demolished. In 1795, a brick tower was added, with a pyramidal roof, and a new west window was added. A vestry was also added, along with a west gallery.

The church was further altered in 1809, when new pews and a new pulpit were added, and the ceiling plaster is from this date. The roof tiles are acorn shaped, made by Wade and Cherry around 1870. In 1890, a lych gate was constructed at the entrance to the churchyard. Inside the church, the floor in the chancel is tiled, with the tiles thought to be 13th-century, having originally been laid at Jervaulx Abbey, but other fittings have been removed.

A new St Oswald's Church was constructed in the village in 1866, and the old church was converted into a house in 1980.

== See also ==
- Grade II* listed buildings in the City of York
- Listed buildings in Fulford, North Yorkshire
