= 2nd Signal Regiment (United Kingdom) =

2 Signal Regiment
- Active: 1907 - Present
- Country: United Kingdom
- Branch: British Army
- Type: Signals
- Role: Multi Role Signals
- Size: Regiment; 517 personnel (2020)
- Part of: 1st (United Kingdom) Division
- Garrison/HQ: Imphal Barracks, York
- Website: 2 Signal Regiment

Insignia
- Cap Badge

- Tactical Recognition Flash

2 Signal Regiment is a signal regiment of the Royal Corps of Signals within the British Army.

In November 2021, the 'Future Soldier reform' saw the regiment's two squadrons (214 & 219) re-role to provide brigade-level communications for the 4th Light Brigade Combat Team and 7th Light Mechanised Brigade Combat Team respectively.

== History ==
The regiment can trace its history back to 2nd Company, The Telegraph Battalion, Royal Engineers. In 1907, it was designated as the Divisional Telegraph Company of the 2nd Infantry Division.

During the Cold War, the regiment remained the divisional signals regiment of the 2nd Infantry Division. After the end of the Cold War, the regiment was designated as a support signals regiment within 11th Signal Brigade.

Under the Army 2020 reforms, the regiment fell under the command of 7th Signal Group of 11th Signal Brigade. After the disbandment of 2 Signal Brigade the regiment moved to the direct support role for the 11th Signal Brigade.

== Future ==
Under the Future Soldier reforms, the regiment will move from their current base at Imphal Barracks, York to Catterick Garrison by 2028.

The regiment was to form part of the Divisional Integrated Effects Group (DIEG), alongside 37 Signal Regiment, and the 1st and 5th Military Intelligence Battalions from the Intelligence Corps.

2 Signal Regiment will continue to provide support for the 1st (UK) Division. Under the Future Soldier programme, the divisional headquarters will also move from York to Catterick Garrison by 2028.

== Organisation ==
The current organisation of the regiment is:

- Regimental Headquarters, at Imphal Barracks, York
- 214 Signal Squadron (Hawk)
- 219 Signal Squadron (Tripoli)
- Support (Jorvik) Squadron

== Alliances and Affiliations ==
- United Kingdom - Leeds University Officer Training Corps
- United Kingdom - Sheffield University Officer Training Corps

== Honours ==
- 1977 - Gained Freedom of Lübbecke
- 2001 - Gained Freedom of York
- 2017 - Awarded Firmin Sword of Peace
