= Conwyn Mansel-Jones =

Recipient of the Victoria Cross

Colonel Conwyn Mansel-Jones VC CMG DSO
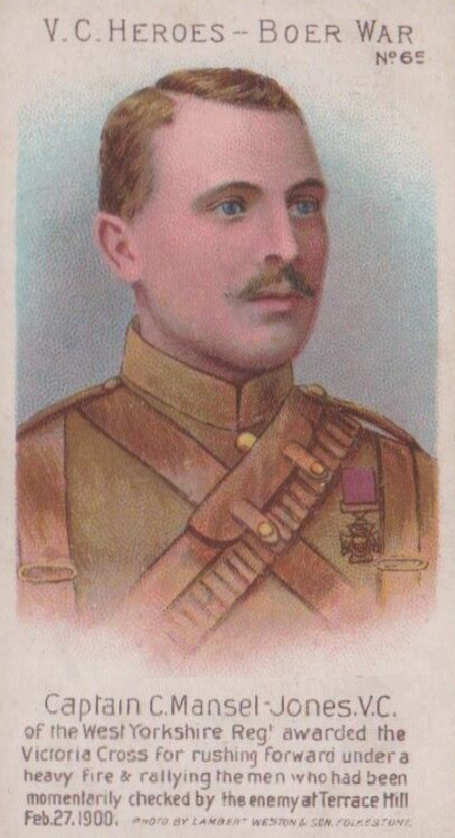
- Mansel-Jones depicted on a cigarette card
- Born: 14 June 1871; Beddington, Surrey
- Died: 29 May 1942 (aged 70); Brockenhurst, Hampshire
- Burial place: St Nicholas Churchyard, Brockenhurst
- Military career
- Allegiance: United Kingdom
- Branch: British Army
- Service years: 1890–1910, 1914–1918
- Rank: Colonel
- Units: The West Yorkshire Regiment
- Conflicts: Fourth Anglo-Ashanti War; Second Boer War; First World War
- Awards: Victoria Cross; Order of St Michael and St George; Distinguished Service Order; Légion d'honneur
- Other work: Barrister

Colonel Conwyn Mansel-Jones VC CMG DSO (14 June 1871 – 29 May 1942) was an English British Army officer. He was a recipient of the Victoria Cross, the highest and most prestigious award for gallantry in the face of the enemy that can be awarded to British and Commonwealth forces.

== Early career ==
Born in Beddington, Surrey, and educated at Haileybury College and the Royal Military College Sandhurst, Mansel-Jones was commissioned a second lieutenant in The West Yorkshire Regiment (The Prince of Wales's Own) on 8 October 1890. He was promoted to lieutenant on 1 July 1892, and served with his regiment in the Fourth Anglo-Ashanti War of 1895–96 and in British Central Africa in 1898, where he was promoted to captain supernumerary to his regiment on 20 March 1899. He was recalled to the West Yorkshire Regiment at the outset of the Second Boer War in late 1899, and sent to South Africa.

== Victoria Cross ==
Mansel-Jones took part in the Ladysmith relief force, and was confirmed as a captain in his regiment in February 1900. He was wounded on 27 February 1900, during the battle of the Tugela Heights, two days before the actual relief of Ladysmith.

It was during the battle of the Tugela Heights that Mansel-Jones, then 28 years old, undertook the following deed for which he was awarded the VC:

On the 27th February, 1900, during the assault on Terrace Hill, north of the Tugela, in Natal, the companies of the West Yorkshire Regiment on the northern slope of the hill met with a severe shell, Vickers-Maxim, and rifle fire, and their advance was for a few moments checked. Captain C. Mansel-Jones, however, by his strong initiative, restored confidence, and, in spite of his falling very seriously wounded, the men took the whole ridge without further check, this Officer's self-sacrificing devotion to duty at a critical moment having averted what might have proved a serious check to the whole assault.

== Later career ==
He remained in the army in recruiting until he retired due to his wounds in 1910. He was called to the bar at Lincoln's Inn, but returned to the colours in 1914, serving in staff positions. He became a temporary lieutenant-colonel in December 1915, and a brevet lieutenant-colonel in June 1917. He was awarded the Distinguished Service Order in June 1915, received the French Legion of Honour, was made a Companion of the Order of St Michael and St George in 1918 and was six times mentioned in Despatches.

Retiring at the end of the war, he was a member of the Honourable Corps of Gentlemen at Arms from 1920 until his death. He died aged 70 on 29 May 1942 in Brockenhurst, and is buried in the churchyard of St Nicholas Church.

His medals are held privately.
