= Bradford Moor Barracks =

Defunct military installation in England

- Bradford, West Yorkshire
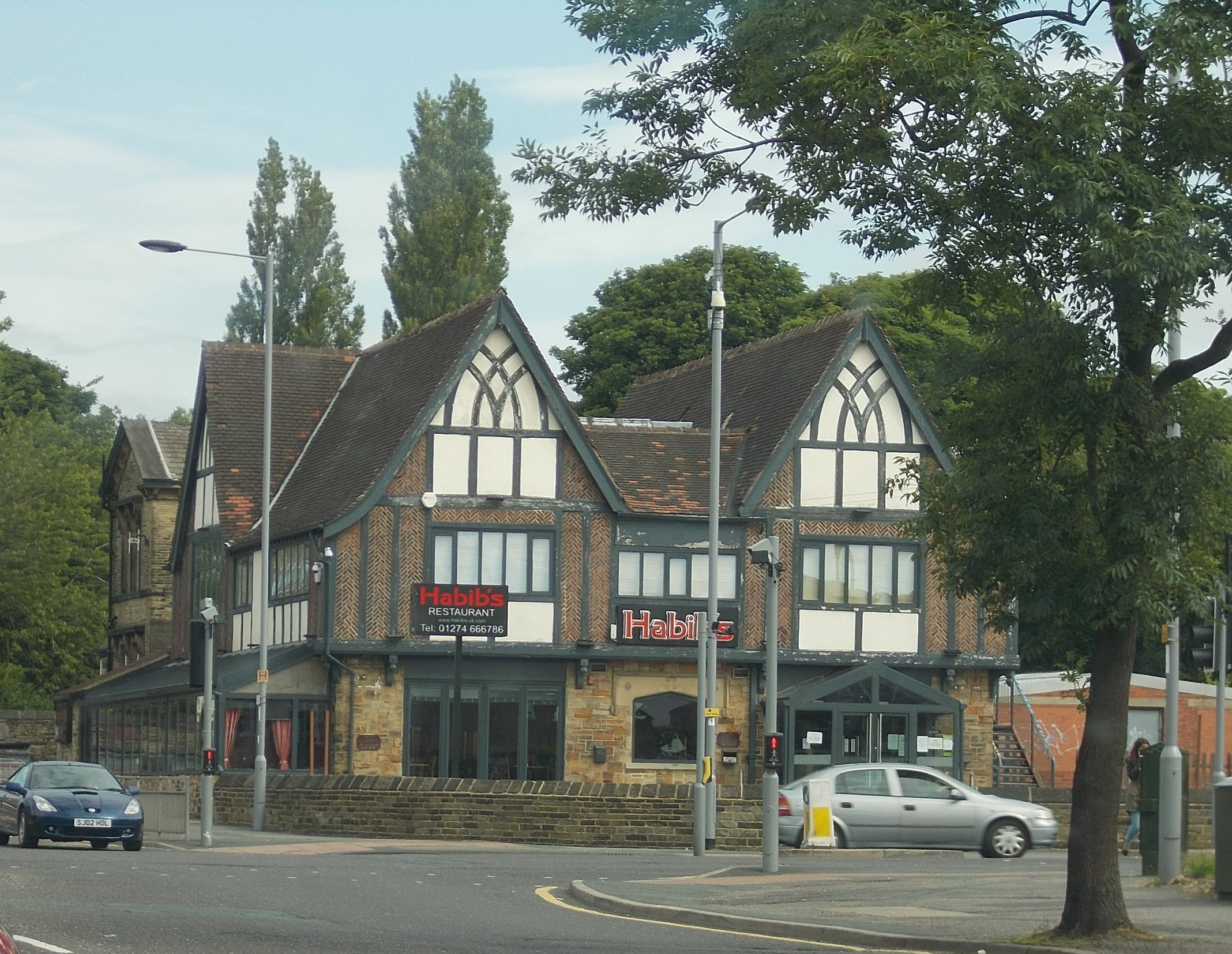
- The now-reopened Barrack Tavern, which used to be frequented by soldiers, is opposite the site of the former barracks.

Site information
- Type: Barracks
- Owner: War Office
- Operator: British Army

Location
- Location within West Yorkshire
- Coordinates: 53.7982°N 1.7196°W

Site history
- Built: 1843–1844
- In use: 1844–1931

Bradford Moor Barracks was a military installation at Bradford in West Yorkshire, England.

== History ==
The barracks were built between 1843 and 1844 as part of the response to the Chartist riots. In 1873 a system of recruiting areas based on counties was instituted and the barracks became the depot for the 14th Regiment of Foot. In 1878 the 14th Regiment of Foot moved to Imphal Barracks in York but other troops from the barracks were deployed to suppress the riots in Bradford in 1891. During the First World War the barracks were used to accommodate German prisoners of war. By 1931 the barracks had been decommissioned and were in a poor state: they were demolished to make way for a housing scheme.
