= Lewis Lyne =

British Army general (1899–1970)

Major-General Lewis Lyne CB DSO
- Lyne in 1946
- Born: 19 August 1899; Newport, Wales
- Died: 4 November 1970 (aged 71); Kersey, Suffolk, England
- Military career
- Allegiance: United Kingdom
- Branch: British Army
- Service years: 1919–1949
- Rank: Major-General
- Nickname: "Lou"
- Service number: 22301
- Unit: Lancashire Fusiliers
- Commands: British Forces in Berlin (1945); 7th Armoured Division (1944–1945); 50th (Northumbrian) Infantry Division (1944); 59th (Staffordshire) Infantry Division (1944); 169th (London) Infantry Brigade (1942–1944); 9th Battalion, Lancashire Fusiliers (1940–1941)
- Conflicts: Second World War
- Awards: Companion of the Order of the Bath; Distinguished Service Order; Mentioned in Despatches (2); Order of Kutuzov, 1st Class (Soviet Union); Legion of Honour (France); Croix de Guerre (France)

Major-General Lewis Owen Lyne, CB, DSO (21 August 1899 – 4 November 1970) was a British Army officer who served before and during the Second World War, rising from the rank of lieutenant-colonel in 1939 to major-general in early 1944. His active service began in mid-1943 when in command of the 169th Brigade in action in North Africa and Italy from 1943 to 1944, followed by the 59th Division during the Battle of Normandy in mid-1944, finally commanding the 7th Armoured Division during the final stages of the Northwestern Europe Campaign until Victory in Europe Day in May 1945. He retired from the army in 1949.

== Early life and military career ==
Born on 21 August 1899 in Newport, Wales, the second son of Charles Lyne, Lewis Lyne was educated at Haileybury and Imperial Service College. He graduated from the Royal Military College, Sandhurst, and was commissioned as a temporary second lieutenant into the Lancashire Fusiliers on 2 April 1919. He gained a regular army commission on 24 July 1921. Posted to the 1st Battalion, Lancashire Fusiliers, he spent most of the interwar period serving with the battalion in various parts of the world, including Ireland, Egypt, Gibraltar and China. He was promoted to lieutenant on 14 July 1923.

Lyne returned to England to attend the Staff College, Camberley, from 1935 to 1936, where his fellow students included Eric Bols, Terence Airey, Joseph Charles Haydon, Geoffrey Bourne, Walter Lentaigne, Freddie de Guingand and Charles Keightley, along with both Henry Wells of the Australian Army and Rod Keller of the Canadian Army. While there, on 16 October 1935, he was promoted to captain. After graduating he became a staff officer at the War Office in 1938 until the outbreak of war the following year. He was made a brevet major on 1 July 1938, a major on 1 August, and brevet lieutenant colonel on 1 July 1939.

== Second World War ==
By the outbreak of the Second World War in September 1939, Lyne was deputy assistant military secretary at the War Office. In November, he was promoted to acting lieutenant colonel (made temporary in late February) and became assistant military secretary, where he was responsible for the minor details of officer appointments. In August 1940, after the British Expeditionary Force (BEF) was evacuated from Dunkirk, Lyne with a small cadre of Regular soldiers was appointed commanding officer of the 9th Battalion, Lancashire Fusiliers in Bury, a war service battalion composed largely of conscripts.

In October the battalion became part of the 208th Independent Infantry Brigade (Home), then serving in Scotland under Scottish Command, but in December was transferred to Brigadier The O'Donovan's 125th Infantry Brigade (which also included the 1/5th and 1/6th Battalions of the Lancashire Fusiliers), part of the 42nd (East Lancashire) Infantry Division commanded by Major General Henry Willcox, which had fought with distinction in France with the BEF and was now stationed in East Anglia on anti-invasion duties. In late June 1941, after commanding his battalion for over 10 months, he went on to be Chief Instructor at the Senior Officers' School, Sheerness, and was promoted to the local rank of colonel in late July. The school was then focused on preparing relatively junior officers, mainly majors, for the command of battalions and regiments.

Promoted to the acting rank of brigadier in March 1942 (and acting colonel on the same date, six months later temporary colonel and temporary brigadier), Lyne was given command of the 169th (London) Infantry Brigade, part of the 56th (London) Infantry Division, then commanded by Major General Eric Miles, who Lyne knew briefly when the latter was general officer commanding (GOC) of the 42nd Division from late April 1941. The brigade, which Lyne would command for the next two years in several different countries and in some of the most difficult battles of the war, was known as the "Queen's Brigade" as it contained three second-line Territorial Army battalions of the Queen's Royal Regiment (West Surrey). The 169th Brigade had formerly been the 35th Infantry Brigade, part of the 12th (Eastern) Division, which had been severely mauled while serving with the BEF before joining the 56th Division in July 1940, after the 12th Division was broken up; the 35th Brigade was redesignated the 169th Brigade in November. The 56th Division was then serving in East Anglia, Lyne's brigade being stationed in Nacton, Suffolk, and in June orders were received to prepare to mobilise for active service overseas.

=== Middle East and North Africa ===
The next few weeks for the 56th Division were hectic as it began to mobilise for service overseas, which was completed by late August. The division left England soon after, arriving in Kirkup, Iraq, in November 1942. The division formed part of the Indian XXI Corps of the Tenth Army, which was given the role of preventing the Germans from reaching the Persian Gulf from the Caucasus. However, with the German defeat at Stalingrad in February 1943, the threat receded and the 56th Division focused its attention on training for offensive operations, and began training in mountain warfare. In March, the division (minus the 168th Brigade) was ordered to join the British Eighth Army, then fighting in the final stages of the Tunisian Campaign. The two brigades of the division then began a 3,200-mile journey from Kirkup to Enfidaville, Tunisia. The journey took four weeks and is the longest approach march in the history of the British Army.

Arriving there in late April, Lyne's brigade began to relieve elements of the veteran 2nd New Zealand Division, in contact with the enemy, in the mountains north of Enfidaville on the night of 26 April. Two days later, the X Corps (which the 56th Division formed part) commander, Lieutenant General Brian Horrocks, ordered the brigade to seize Djebel Srafi and Djebel Terhouna. Although the attack began well, a counterattack on the first objective sent men of the 2/5th Queen's, commanded by Lieutenant Colonel John Whitfield (who would later be GOC 56th Division), back to their own start lines. However, the Tunisian Campaign itself was finished just over two weeks later, with most of the Allied strength being diverted to the British First Army, advancing on the city of Tunis from the west, soon falling to the Allies on 7 May, and the campaign officially ending on 13 May 1943, with some 238,000 Axis soldiers surrendering.

=== Italy ===
With the campaign over, the division, now commanded by Major General Douglas Graham after Miles was severely injured on 5 May, was in late May sent to Libya to rest and absorb reinforcements, as well as to train for amphibious operations in preparation for the Allied invasion of Italy. Lyne was made a colonel on 3 July (with seniority dating back to 1 July 1942), mentioned in despatches on 5 August for his services in Persia and Iraq, and two weeks later awarded the Distinguished Service Order (DSO) for his services in the Middle East.

The division landed on the beaches of Salerno, Italy on 9 September, with Lyne's brigade landing on the 56th Division's left, and aiming for the objective, Montecorvino airfield. The 169th Brigade destroyed thirty-nine aircraft on the ground but, despite support from a squadron of Sherman tanks of the Royal Scots Greys, German resistance was stubborn and they refused to move off the airfield and only fell, almost four days later, after fierce fighting, with heavy losses to all three Queen's battalions. Even then, the brigade was within range of German artillery fire, thus temporarily negating the use of the airfields to the Allies.

Over the next few days Lyne's brigade, holding a large sector of the front with too few troops, was reinforced with a company of Royal Engineers acting as infantry. With the Germans, who had been concerned mainly with attacking the division's right – where there had emerged a large gap between the US and British forces – on the retreat from Salerno on 17 September, due to the situation turning in favour of the Allies, the brigade, along with the rest of the heavily battered 56th Division, spent the next few days in further fighting in an attempt to break through the mountain passes on the path to Naples. On 27 September Lyne's brigade was relieved by Brigadier "Bolo" Whistler's 131st Brigade.

The capture of Naples followed days later, with Lieutenant General Richard McCreery's British X Corps (under which command the 56th Division was serving) advancing on the left of the US Fifth Army, reaching the defensive line on the Volturno river by 9 October. The day after, the division's GOC, Major General Graham, was injured and Lyne, the most senior brigade commander, took temporary command of the division for the Volturno crossing. Although the other two X Corps divisions, the 7th Armoured and 46th, gained a foothold across the river, the 56th Division managed only to gain a weak foothold, which was not exploited. The division had to use the US 3rd Division's crossing point. Around this time the 168th Brigade (which was detached from the division in April) also returned to the 56th Division. On 15 October Major General Gerald Templer arrived to take command of the division, and Lyne returned to the 169th Brigade.

The division's next task was to assault Monte Camino, the last major feature before the Winter Line (or Gustav Line), which failed in mid-November with heavy losses, mainly to the 201st Guards Brigade, with Lyne himself being wounded on 13 November. Returning by early December, the division, with Lyne's brigade playing a major role, was supported by a very heavy artillery barrage and took part in the second attempt to capture Monte Camino, which was taken and the Germans finally thrown off the mountain. On 8 January 1944, however, Lyne returned to hospital and so missed the division's crossing of the Garigliano river during the first Battle of Monte Cassino. He returned to the brigade on 21 January, as it captured the first peaks of the Aurunci Mountains. After holding its positions for the next few weeks, the 56th Division was ordered to the Anzio beachhead in early February, where the Allied forces there were in serious trouble.

=== Northwest Europe ===
In early March the heavily battered 56th Division was relieved by the 5th Division, with Lyne's 169th Brigade being relieved by the 13th Brigade. The intention was to return to Egypt for rest and retraining. Just before the division set sail, however, Lyne was ordered to return to England to become GOC of the 59th (Staffordshire) Infantry Division, taking over from Major General William Bradshaw. He was promoted to the acting rank of major general on 29 March. The division – comprising the 176th, 177th and 197th Infantry Brigades plus supporting divisional troops – had been training in the United Kingdom since its creation in August 1939 as a second-line duplicate of the 55th (West Lancashire) Infantry Division. Despite a few of its units having seen action in France in 1940, for the most part the division was inexperienced, although well trained, and had been selected to take part in the Allied invasion of Normandy as part of the 21st Army Group, commanded by General Sir Bernard Montgomery. The division was serving in Kent as part of XII Corps of the Second Army, commanded by Lieutenant General Miles Dempsey.

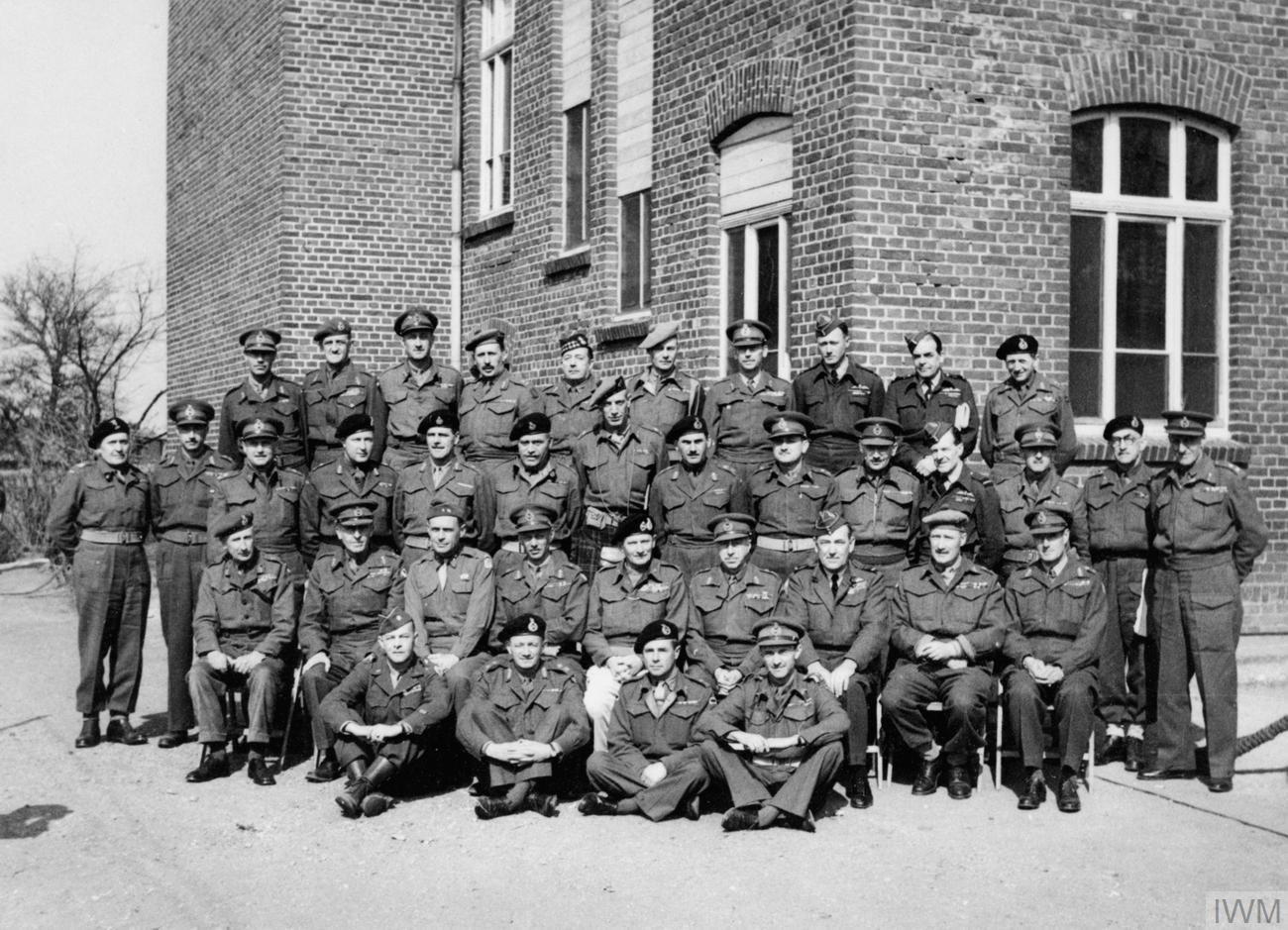
Field Marshal Sir Bernard Montgomery with his staff, army, corps and division GOCs at Walbeck, Germany, on 22 March 1945. Lyne is second from the left, seated on the ground.

The 59th Division landed in Normandy in late June 1944, almost three weeks after the D-Day landings on 6 June. Soon after arrival the division transferred from XII Corps to Lieutenant General John Crocker's I Corps and, on 8 July, took part in Operation Charnwood, a frontal assault aimed at capturing Caen. Although a D-Day objective for the British 3rd Division, stubborn resistance from the German 21st Panzer Division prevented the division from capturing the city, as had numerous attempts afterwards. Lyne's 59th Division, supported by elements of the 27th Armoured Brigade, and with the British 3rd Division on its left and the 3rd Canadian Division on its right, attacking through La Bijude and Galmanche, were faced by the 12th SS Panzer Division and fierce fighting took place. By 9 July most of Caen was in Allied hands. The 59th Division, in its first major operation, suffered over 1,200 casualties.

The division soon moved back on 11 July to XII Corps, two days later transferring to Lieutenant General Gerard Bucknall's XXX Corps. In mid-July the division fought in the Second Battle of the Odon, where it had to capture Noyers and Missy, operating with the 49th (West Riding) Infantry Division. The operation was intended to divert German attention away from Operation Goodwood, but failed and cost the 59th Division further casualties. The division again joined XII Corps and, after the Americans launched Operation Cobra, XXX Corps, now commanded by Lieutenant General Brian Horrocks after Bucknall was sacked, launched Operation Bluecoat and the Germans began withdrawing to Falaise. At the same time, in the first week of August, the 59th Division, with the 56th Independent Brigade temporarily under command and supported by elements of the 34th Tank Brigade, launched an attack over the Orne river and after much hard fighting – with Captain David Jamieson of the 7th Battalion, Royal Norfolks securing the 59th Division's first and only Victoria Cross – secured a bridgehead at Grimbosq, before advancing to Falaise where it held the edge of the "pocket".

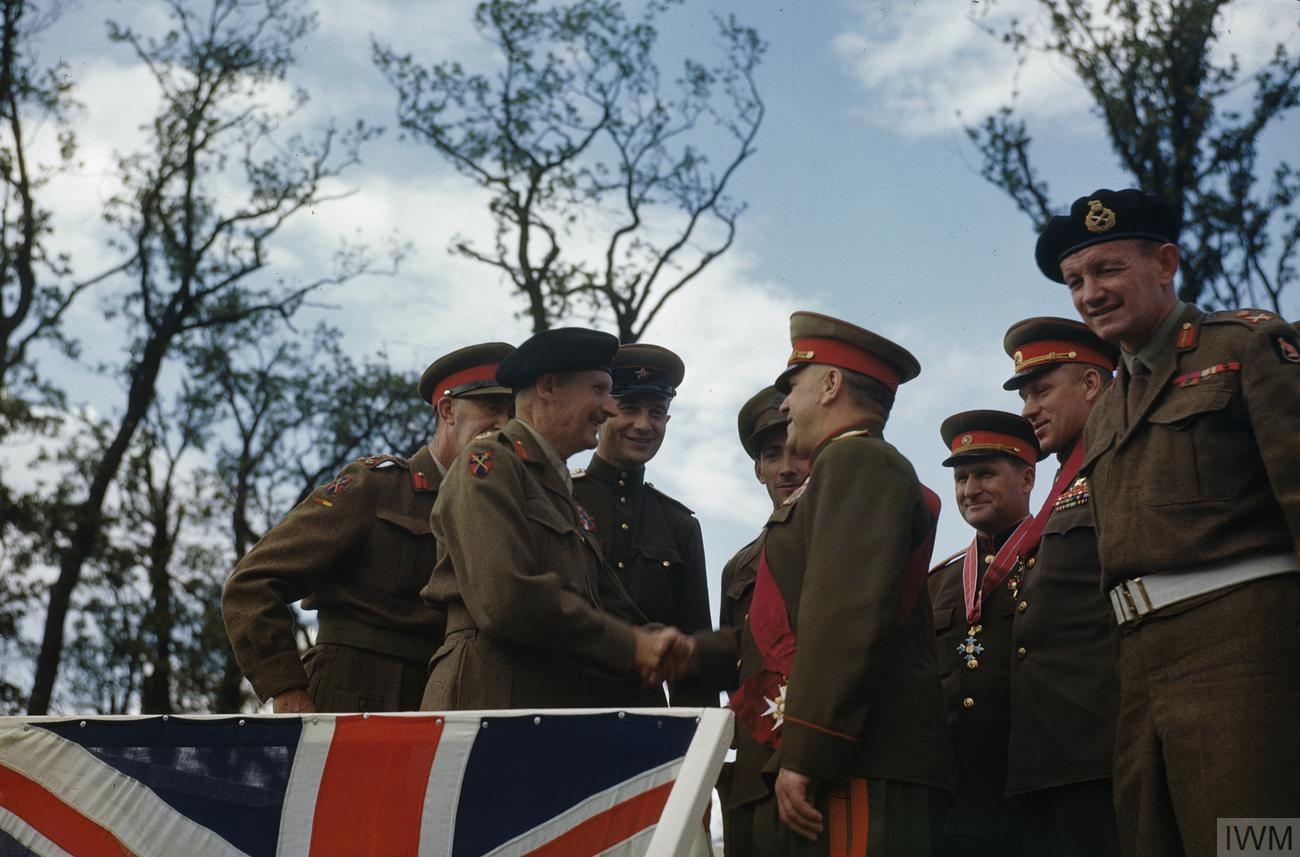
Marshal Georgy Zhukov shakes hands with Field Marshal Sir Bernard Montgomery following a ceremony at the Brandenburg Gate, Berlin, on 12 July 1945. Lyne is at left; his 7th Armoured Division had formed a Guard of Honour at the ceremony.

The end of the Normandy Campaign also saw the disbandment of the 59th Division. By this stage of the war, Britain had reached the limits of its manpower, replacements for casualties were severely lacking and some units were broken up and their men posted to other units to fill gaps. With Lyne's 59th Division being the most junior British division in France, it was broken up, although not as a reflection of its performance, with Montgomery, the army group commander, and Dempsey, the army commander, both being highly impressed with the division. The division HQ remained in suspended animation until October and Lyne temporarily commanded the 50th (Northumbrian) Infantry Division in place of the GOC, Major General Douglas Graham, who had been Lyne's superior as GOC 56th Division in Italy. Graham returned in late November, only for the 50th Division to suffer the same fate as the 59th Division, again due to manpower shortages, although the division was reduced to a training reserve formation.

On 22 November, Lyne was, unusually for an infantryman, selected to become GOC of the veteran 7th Armoured Division, in place of Major General Gerald Lloyd-Verney who, his superiors believed, had been over-promoted. The division was a much changed formation to the one which had fought in the Western Desert and consisted of the 22nd Armoured and 131st Infantry Brigades, having gone through changes of command. Lyne did not see his first action as an armoured commander until mid-January 1945 when, serving in XII Corps, it fought in Operation Blackcock, the attempt to clear the Roer triangle. The operation was successful, with the division managing to seize its objective, despite the frozen ground, with relatively light casualties. The division remained in its positions until relieved in late February.

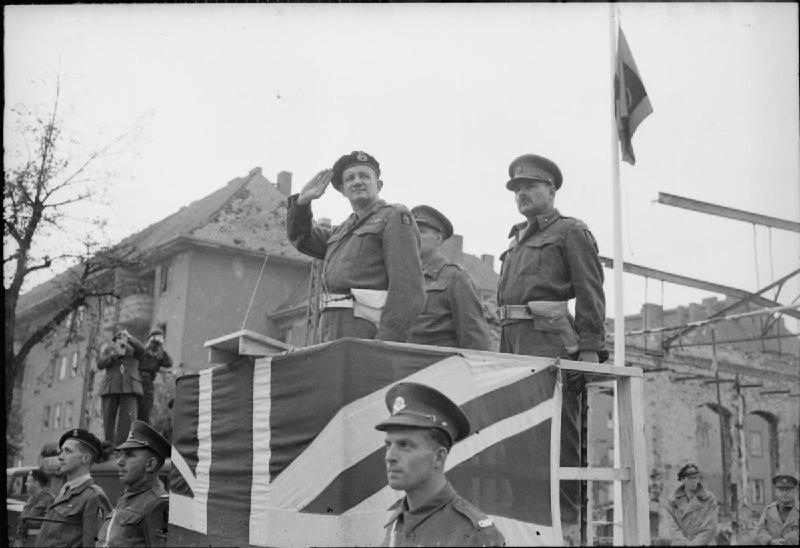
Lyne and Brigadier J. W. K. Spurling, commanding the 131st Brigade take the salute during the entry of British forces into Berlin, 1945.

The division's next assignment was the crossing of the River Rhine into Germany, codenamed Operation Plunder, although the division did not take part in the initial stages, crossing the river on 27 March, three days after the operation began, spearheaded by the 11th Hussars. Two days later Lyne's rank of major general was made temporary. The division, against token resistance, then raced across Germany, capturing thousands of German troops along the way, by 8 April reaching the outskirts of the city of Bremen, which fell to the 3rd Division, and crossed the River Weser a week later. The end of the war in Europe arrived soon after. Lyne took part in the Victory Parade in Berlin on 21 July 1945. He was mentioned in despatches on 7 August for his services in Northwest Europe.

== Postwar ==
Lyne became Commandant of the British Sector in Berlin on 6 July 1945, a position he held while still retaining command of the 7th Armoured Division. He was made Director of Staff Duties at the War Office from 1946 to 1949. He retired from the army due to ill health in early 1949, aged just 49. Never marrying, he died in Kersey, Suffolk, on 4 November 1970. Although he remains largely unknown, Lyne was a highly competent and experienced battlefield commander, gaining respect from both his superiors, most notably Montgomery and Dempsey, and subordinates alike.

== Bibliography ==
- Converse, Alan (2011). Armies of Empire: The 9th Australian and 50th British Divisions in Battle 1939–1945. Cambridge University Press. ISBN 978-0-521-19480-8.
- Heathcote, Tony (1999). The British Field Marshals 1736–1997. Barnsley: Pen & Sword. ISBN 0-85052-696-5.
- Mead, Richard (2007). Churchill's Lions: A Biographical Guide to the Key British Generals of World War II. Stroud: Spellmount. ISBN 978-1-86227-431-0.
- Smart, Nick (2005). Biographical Dictionary of British Generals of the Second World War. Barnsley: Pen & Sword. ISBN 1-84415-049-6.

Military offices
Preceded by William Bradshaw	GOC 59th (Staffordshire) Infantry Division; March–August 1944	Post disbanded
Preceded by Douglas Graham	GOC 50th (Northumbrian) Infantry Division; October–November 1944	Succeeded by Douglas Graham
Preceded by Gerald Lloyd-Verney	GOC 7th Armoured Division; 1944–1945	Succeeded by Philip Roberts
New command	Commandant, British Sector in Berlin; July–August 1945	Succeeded by Eric Nares
