= 59th (Staffordshire) Infantry Division =

Second World War British Army unit

59th (Staffordshire) Motor Division 59th (Staffordshire) Infantry Division
- The shoulder insignia of the division: a slag heap and a pit winding gear tower, denoting the association of the division with the Staffordshire area.
- Active: 1939–1944
- Branch: Territorial Army
- Type: Motorised infantry
- Role: Infantry
- Size: War establishment strength: 10,136–18,347 men (Note: This is the war establishment, the on-paper strength. The war establishment of a motor division was 10,136 men; for an infantry division during 1939–1941, it was 13,863 men; following 1941, it was increased to 17,298 men; for the final two years of the war, the war establishment was 18,347 men.)
- Engagements: Operation Charnwood

Commanders
- Notable commanders: Sir Ralph Eastwood; Major-General Frederick Witts; Sir James Steele; Lewis Lyne

The 59th (Staffordshire) Infantry Division was an infantry division of the British Army that was formed during the Second World War and fought in the Battle of Normandy. In March 1939, after Germany re-emerged as a significant military power and invaded Czechoslovakia, the British Army increased the number of divisions in the Territorial Army (TA) by duplicating existing units. The 59th (Staffordshire) Motor Division was formed in September 1939, as a second-line duplicate of the 55th (West Lancashire) Motor Division. The division's battalions were all, initially, raised in Staffordshire.

Established using the motor division concept, the division was formed with only two infantry brigades, rather than the usual three for an infantry division, and was fully mobile. The intention was to increase battlefield mobility, enabling the motor divisions to follow armoured forces through breaches in the enemy frontline to rapidly consolidate captured territory. Following the Battle of France, the concept was abandoned. The division was allocated a third infantry brigade, and became the 59th (Staffordshire) Infantry Division. It remained within the United Kingdom until 1944, assigned to anti-invasion and guard duties, while training for combat overseas.

In late June 1944, the division was assigned to the Second Army and transferred to France to take part in the Battle for Normandy. On 7 July, the division saw action in Operation Charnwood, which resulted in the capture of the German-occupied city of Caen. A week later, the division fought in Operation Pomegranate. The territorial goal of this operation was to capture the town of Noyers, which was not accomplished due to determined German resistance. The fighting played an important role in distracting German forces from the major British offensive, Operation Goodwood, which was launched soon after. By late July, the German frontline was crumbling, and a general offensive was launched. The division advanced and captured a bridgehead over the River Orne, fending off several counter-attacks to maintain its hold; during these actions one member of the division earned the Victoria Cross. The division's final combat was a protracted battle to capture the town of Thury-Harcourt. Historians have praised the effort of the division in these battles, during which it suffered several thousand casualties. By August 1944, the British Army was badly short of manpower in many of its units. As the division was the most recently established formation serving within the Second Army in France, and not as a result of its performance, it was chosen to be disbanded and its men transferred to other units to bring them up to strength. The division was broken up on 26 August, and officially disbanded on 19 October 1944.

== Background ==
During the 1930s, tensions increased between Germany and the United Kingdom and its allies. In late 1937 and throughout 1938, German demands for the annexation of the Sudetenland in Czechoslovakia led to an international crisis. To avoid war, the British Prime Minister Neville Chamberlain met with German Chancellor Adolf Hitler in September and brokered the Munich Agreement. The agreement averted a war and allowed Germany to annex the Sudetenland. Although Chamberlain had intended the agreement to lead to further peaceful resolution of issues, relations between both countries soon deteriorated. On 15 March 1939, Germany breached the terms of the agreement by invading and occupying the remnants of the Czech state.

On 29 March, British Secretary of State for War Leslie Hore-Belisha announced plans to increase the part-time Territorial Army (TA) from 130,000 to 340,000 men and double the number of TA divisions. (Note: The Territorial Army (TA) was a reserve of the British regular army made up of part-time volunteers. By 1939, its intended role was the sole method of expanding the size of the British Army. (This is comparable to the creation of Kitchener's Army during the First World War.) Existing territorial formations would create a second division using a cadre of trained personnel and, if needed, a third division would be created. All TA recruits were required to take the general service obligation: if the British Government decided, territorial soldiers could be deployed overseas for combat. (This avoided the complications of the First World War-era Territorial Force, whose members were not required to leave Britain unless they volunteered for overseas service.)) The plan was for existing TA divisions, referred to as the first-line, to recruit over their establishments (aided by an increase in pay for Territorials, the removal of restrictions on promotion which had hindered recruiting, construction of better-quality barracks and an increase in supper rations) and then form a new division, known as the second-line, from cadres around which the divisions could be expanded. This process was dubbed "duplicating". The 59th Division was to be a second-line unit, a duplicate of the first-line 55th (West Lancashire) Motor Division. In April, limited conscription was introduced. This resulted in 34,500 twenty-year-old militiamen being conscripted into the regular army, initially to be trained for six months before deployment to the forming second-line units. It was envisioned that the duplicating process and recruiting the required numbers of men would take no more than six months. Some TA divisions had made little progress by the time the Second World War began; others were able to complete this work within a matter of weeks.

== Formation and home defence ==
On 15 September, the 59th (Staffordshire) Motor Division became active. The division took control of the 176th and the 177th Brigades, as well as divisional support units, which had previously been administered by the 55th (West Lancashire) Motor Division. The 176th Brigade initially consisted of the 7th Battalion, South Staffordshire Regiment (7SSR), and the 6th and 7th Battalions, North Staffordshire Regiment (6NSR and 7NSR). When transferred to the division, the 177th Infantry Brigade was made up of the 1/6th, 2/6th, and 5th Battalions, South Staffordshire Regiment (1/6SSR, 2/6SSR, 5SSR). The division was assigned to Western Command, Major-General John Blakiston-Houston becoming the division's first General Officer Commanding (GOC). Blakiston-Houston, who had retired in 1938, was the former Commandant of the Army School of Equitation and the Inspector of Cavalry. To denote the association of the division with the Staffordshire area, where most of the division's battalions were raised, its insignia referred to the Staffordshire coalfields: a black triangle denoting a slag heap, with a pit winding gear tower in red.

The division was formed as a motor division, one of five such divisions in the British Army. (Note: The other four being the 1st London, 2nd London, 50th (Northumbrian) and 55th (West Lancashire) divisions.) British military doctrine development during the inter-war period resulted in three types of division by the end of the 1930s: the infantry division; the mobile division (later called the armoured division); and the motor division. David French, a historian, wrote "The main role of the infantry ... was to break into the enemy's defensive position." This would then be exploited by the mobile division, followed by the motor divisions that would "carry out the rapid consolidation of the ground captured by the mobile divisions" therefore "transform[ing] the 'break-in' into a 'break-through'." Per French, the motor division "matched that of the German army's motorized and light divisions. But there the similarities ended." German motorised divisions contained three brigades and were as fully equipped as a regular infantry division, while their smaller light divisions contained a tank battalion. The British motor division, while being fully motorised and capable of transporting all their infantry, was "otherwise much weaker than normal infantry divisions" or their German counterparts as it was made up of only two brigades, had two artillery regiments as opposed to an infantry division's three, and contained no tanks.

The TA's war deployment plan envisioned the divisions being deployed, as equipment became available, to reinforce the British Expeditionary Force (BEF) already dispatched to Europe. The TA would join regular army divisions in waves as its divisions completed their training, the final divisions deploying a year after the war began. The 59th Division spent the early months of the war training new recruits including conscripts; a task made difficult by the need for the division to provide guards for important locations, and a severe shortage of equipment and trained officers and non-commissioned officers. On 1 December 1939, Major-General Thomas Ralph Eastwood, previously the commandant of the Royal Military College, Sandhurst, took command of the division and held this position until May 1940. During this period, the 1/6SSR was the only element of the division to go abroad. It was dispatched to France, while officially remaining part of the division's 177th Brigade, as part of the attempt to address manpower shortages among the BEF's rear-echelon units, and its personnel were utilised in a pioneer capacity digging anti-tank ditches and constructing breastworks. (Note: The military historian Lionel Ellis stated that by the end of April 1940 there were "78,864 [men employed on] lines-of-communication duties; 23,545 were in headquarters of various services and missions, hospitals and miscellaneous employment; 9,051 were in drafts en route; 2,515 were not yet allocated, and 6,859 were with the Advanced Air Striking Force". Included in these figures, was "upwards of 10,000 men, and other large units [who] were engaged on railway and building construction, at bases and on the long lines of communication". More men were needed to work along the line of communication, and the army had estimated that by mid-1940 it would need at least 60,000 pioneers. The lack of such men had taxed the Royal Engineers (RE) and Auxiliary Military Pioneer Corps (AMPC) as well as impacting frontline units, which had to be diverted from training to help construct defensive positions along the Franco-Belgian border. To address this issue, it was decided to deploy untrained territorial units as an unskilled workforce; thereby alleviating the strain on the logistical units and freeing up regular units to complete training.) The battalion was caught up in the latter stages of the Battle of France and the withdrawal to Dunkirk harbour; on 2 June, the battalion was evacuated via the harbour's mole. The rest of the division was not deployed, and as a result of the evacuation was not deployed to France per the original deployment timeline.

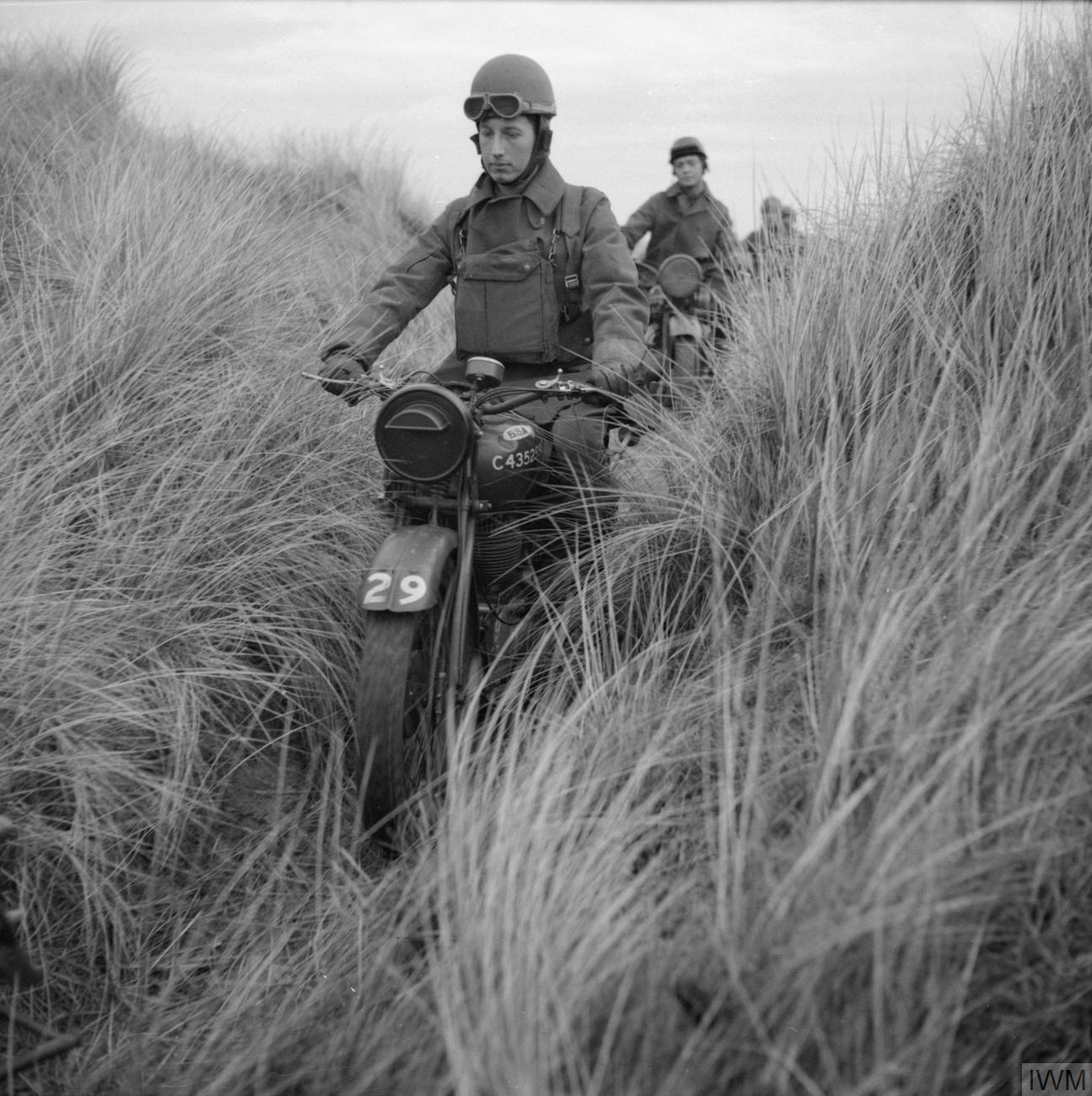
Motorcyclists of the 59th Battalion, Reconnaissance Corps at Ballykinlar, Northern Ireland, 6 December 1941.

In May, Eastwood was selected by Lieutenant-General Alan Brooke for a staff role within the Second BEF (Note: Following the evacuation at Dunkirk, 140,000 British soldiers remained in France. Most were lines-of-communication troops (including those organised as the Beauman Division), as well as the 1st Armoured and the 51st (Highland) Infantry Divisions. The British government, determined to reinforce the French, prepared to dispatch a new BEF as soon as forces became available. The first wave of reinforcements would include the 1st Canadian Division and 52nd (Lowland) Infantry Division. Brooke and the vanguard arrived in Cherbourg on 12 June; the French suggested the formation of a national redoubt in Brittany, using the new BEF and whatever French forces could be mustered. With such a plan impractical, the French Army disintegrating and large numbers of the remaining British forces already evacuated, Brooke fought for an end to further deployments and withdrew what forces he could back to the United Kingdom.) and was replaced by Major-General Frederick Witts, who arrived from a General Staff position. As soon as the Battle of France ended, the British Army began implementing lessons learnt from the campaign. This included a decision that the standard division would be based around three brigades, and the abandonment of the motor division concept. This process involved the break up of four second-line territorial divisions to reinforce depleted formations and aid in transforming the Army's five motor divisions, each made up of two brigades, into infantry divisions made up of three brigades. As part of this process, on 23 June, the 66th Infantry Division was disbanded. This freed up the 197th Infantry Brigade and an artillery regiment to be transferred to the 59th (Staffordshire) Motor Division, which became the 59th (Staffordshire) Infantry Division. (Note: The other brigades of 66th Division were transferred to the 1st London and 55th (West Lancashire) divisions to complete their transition to infantry formations. 12th (Eastern) Infantry Division was disbanded on 11 July 1940, its brigades being allocated to 1st London and 2nd London Motor Divisions as part of their transition to infantry formations. 23rd (Northumbrian) Division was broken up on 30 June, one brigade being transferred to 50th (Northumberland) Motor Division.)

During June, the division moved to defend the Humber estuary and was deployed in Lincolnshire and Yorkshire, assigned to Northern Command, before joining the newly formed X Corps on 24 June. The division alternated between anti-invasion and beach defence duties against a potential German invasion, and training for offensive operations. Priority for new equipment was given to a handful of formations in Southern England that would launch the riposte to any German landing. The 59th Division, at the end of May 1940, was short of equipment and had to requisition civilian transport. On paper, an infantry division was to have seventy-two 25-pounder field guns, but the 59th was only equipped with four First World War-vintage 18-pounder field guns and seven 4.5 in (110 mm) howitzers of similar vintage. Furthermore, the division had no anti-tank guns against a nominal establishment of 48. As the year progressed, the British Army raised 140 infantry battalions. In October, these battalions were formed into independent infantry brigades for static beach defence. Several brigades were assigned to Northern Command, which allowed the 59th Division to be relieved of its defensive role and begin brigade and division exercises.

On 15 February 1941, Witts was replaced by newly promoted Major-General James Steele (who had commanded the 132nd Brigade during the Battle of France). On 20 June, Brooke, now Commander-in-Chief, Home Forces, inspected the division and left highly satisfied, believing the men possessed an "eagerness in the eyes". Brooke recorded in his diary, "Spent day inspecting 59th Div, which has made great progress during the last year". Intensive training began and new equipment started to arrive; in September the division joined IX Corps as a mobile reserve, behind the Durham and North Riding County Division, the corps' static beach defence formation.

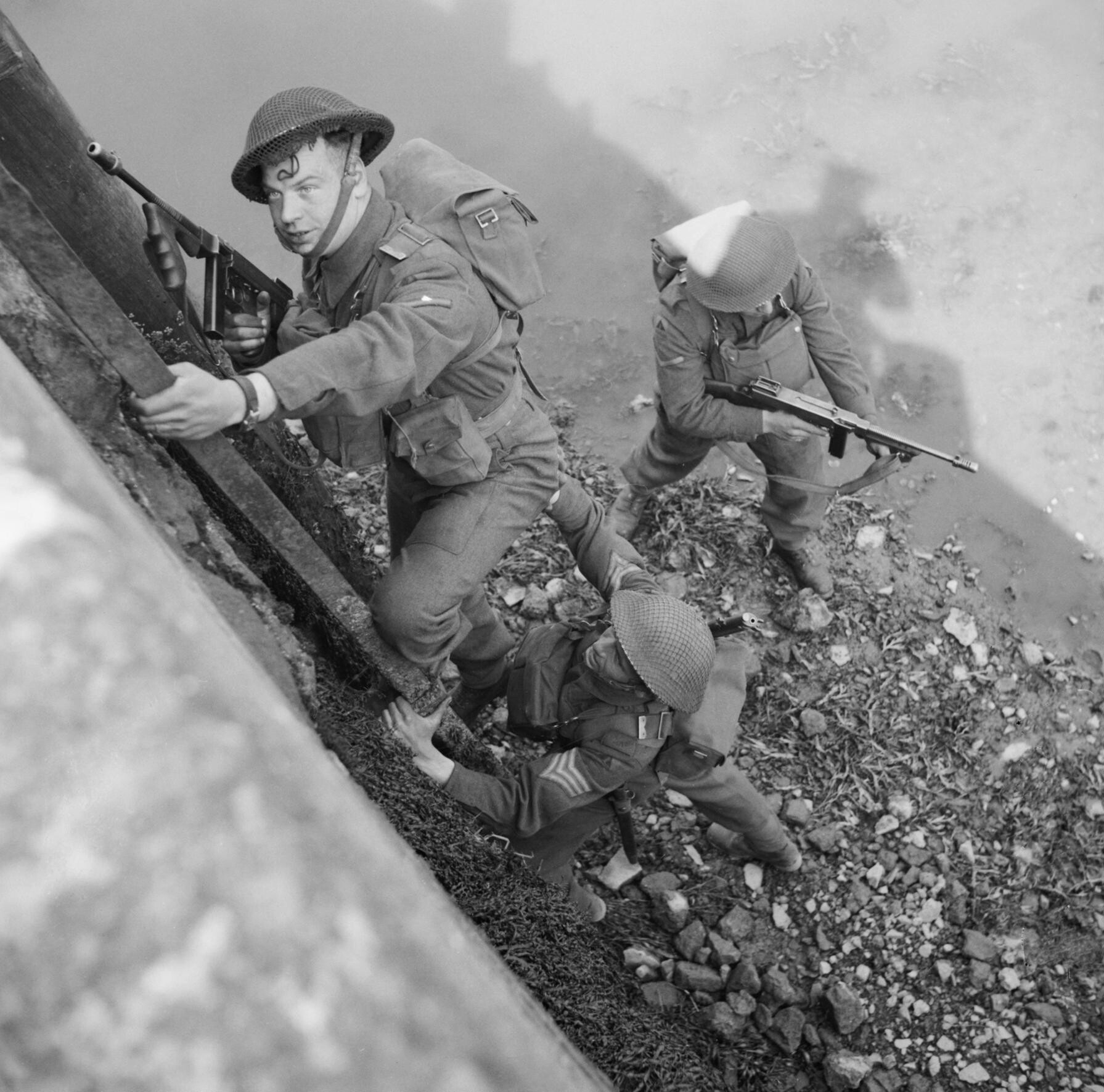
Men of the South Staffordshire Regiment of the 59th Division climb up onto a harbour wall during an amphibious exercise in Northern Ireland, 24 April 1942.

In November, the division was deployed to Northern Ireland where it came under the command of III Corps in Western Command. On 8 April, Steele was promoted and left the division; he was replaced by Major-General William Bradshaw (who had held a series of brigade appointments within the United Kingdom). In June, the division was assigned to British Forces Northern Ireland. For the majority of 1942, the division conducted extensive field exercises. In June 1942, the division was visited by King George VI and his wife Queen Elizabeth. Later in the month, it took part in the first major joint Anglo-American exercise, a ten-day event codenamed Atlantic, in which the United States V Corps (US 1st Armored Division, 59th (Staffordshire), and British 72nd Infantry Brigade) engaged British Forces Northern Ireland (US 34th, and British 61st Divisions).

On 22 March 1943, the division returned to England. It was placed under the command of XII Corps, and based in Kent. The intensity of divisional training increased for amphibious landings and combined operations. As the division had had little in the way of tank-infantry co-operation training or experience, the 34th Tank Brigade was attached in September. In November, the division took part in exercise "Canute II". In December, General Bernard Montgomery arrived in the United Kingdom and took over the 21st Army Group. Montgomery met with division commanders and replaced inexperienced commanders with ones who had served under him in North Africa and Italy. Bradshaw and two of his brigade commanders were removed. Bradshaw was replaced by the highly experienced Major-General Lewis Lyne, who had commanded infantry brigades in Africa and Italy. Lyne concluded that the divisional training lacked realism, and arranged further training exercises to prepare the division for combat. In April 1944, the division received several Canadian officers as part of the CANLOAN scheme (a project that saw the Canadian Army loan 673 officers, mostly lieutenants, to the British Army (Note: This was the result of the 7th and 8th Canadian Divisions being disbanded, and to an excess of junior officers being trained, which created a surplus. The 635 Canadian officers would soon see combat, being deployed with numerous formations, during the Battle of Normandy. Many of the officers were in command of platoons, and saw heavy fighting and casualties. By 27 July 1944, 465 of the officers had become casualties, including 127 killed or dying of wounds; 41 received the Military Cross.)). The men of the division continued training until they were ordered to Normandy.

== Overseas service ==
=== Operation Charnwood ===
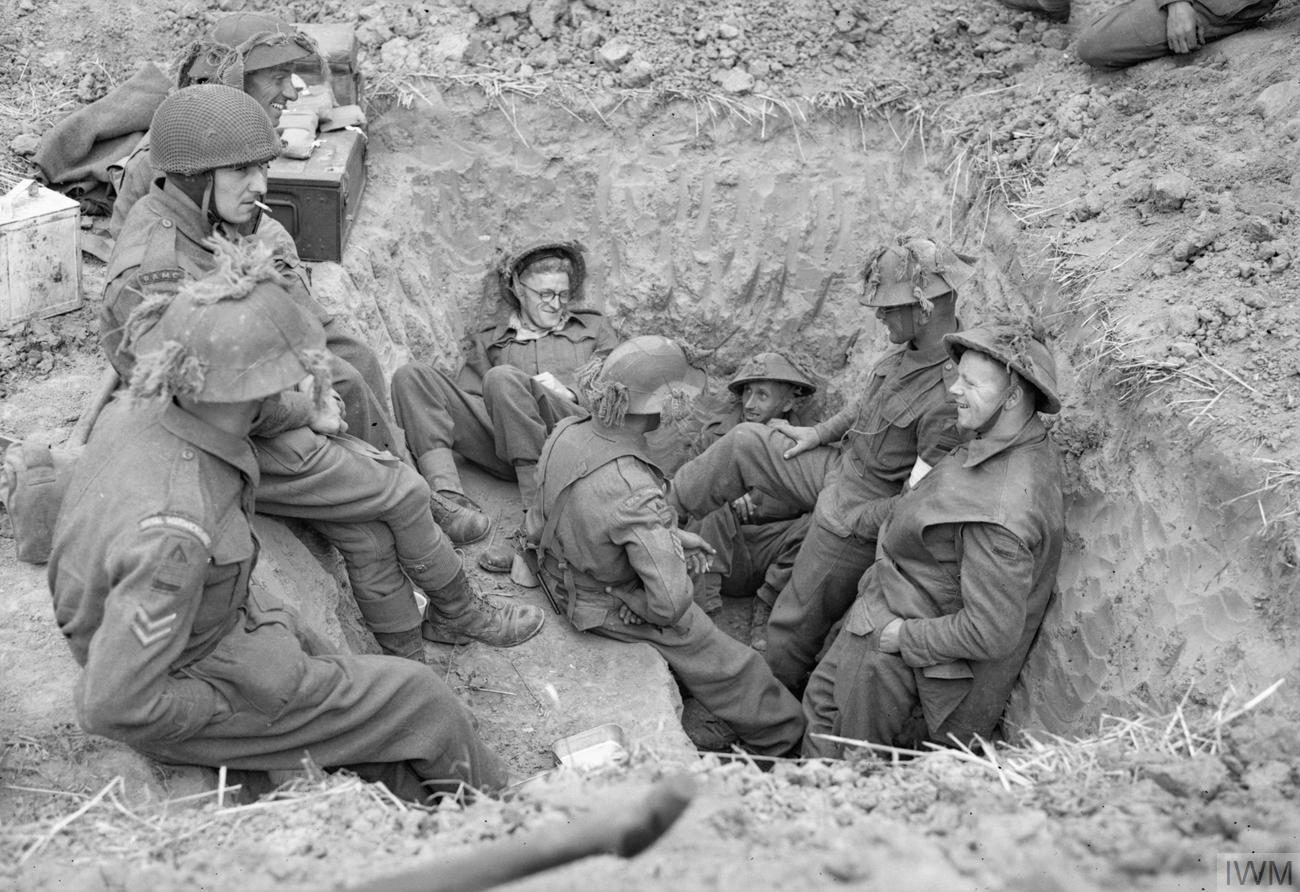
Infantrymen of the 1/7th Battalion, Royal Warwickshire Regiment dug in on the outskirts of Caen, France, 9 July 1944.

On 6 June 1944, the Allies launched Operation Overlord, the invasion of German-occupied Western Europe, with landings at several points along the Normandy coastline in France. The primary objective of the 21st Army Group was the capture of the city of Caen. The initial assault, carried out by the 3rd Infantry Division, was unable to capture the city resulting in the prolonged Battle of Caen. Subsequent operations, including Operations Perch and Epsom, also failed in their attempts to capture the city. In late June, Montgomery ordered XII Corps, part of the British Second Army and of the 21st Army Group, to be shipped to France due to the need for fresh infantry formations. The 59th Division, which was still part of XII Corps, started transferring to Normandy on 21 June and completed the move on the 27th. Elements of the division landed at Le Hamel, on Gold Beach. The 59th was the final British infantry division to arrive in Normandy. (Note: By the time the division landed, the Second Army had suffered 24,698 casualties and the German military an estimated 35,000 casualties in the attrition warfare around Caen.) The next large-scale attack (Note: Montgomery adopted an operational technique of carefully planned large-scale attack to reduce casualties, increase morale, and compensate for infantry shortages. This involved the build-up of infantry, supported by massed artillery and armour support, that would strike along a narrow front.) in the attempt to seize Caen was Operation Charnwood. While previous attacks had utilised flanking manoeuvres, Charnwood was intended as a frontal assault on the city. The attack would be undertaken by I Corps, and on 4 July the 59th Division was assigned to the corps to take part in the impending operation.

During the evening of 7 July, around 2,500 long tons (2,500 metric tons) of bombs were dropped on northern Caen. The first divisional casualties were also suffered, due to German shelling. (Note: The effect of the bombing is debated, as few bombs hit military targets. General Miles Dempsey, commander of the Second Army, argued that he was more concerned with the morale-boosting effect of the bombing on his troops, than any material losses it might inflict on the Germans.) The 59th Division, supported by the 27th Armoured Brigade, with the British 3rd Division on the left and the 3rd Canadian Division on the right, launched their attack the following morning. Charnwood began at 04:20, with the 176th and 177th Brigades leading the division's effort. On the western flank, 2/6SSR spearheaded the 177th Brigade's attack on Galmanche and the surrounding wood; on the eastern flank, 6NSR led the 177th Brigade's move to capture La Bijude. The division was initially opposed by elements of the 12th SS Panzer Division Hitlerjugend's 1st and 2nd Battalions of the 25th SS-Panzergrenadier Regiment, which put up a determined resistance inside the villages and from a trench system located between the two.

At 07:30, following the capture of the first objectives, including La Bijude, the next stage of the offensive began. Fresh troops moved forward. The 176th Brigade's 7th Battalion, Royal Norfolk Regiment advanced on Épron; the 197th Brigade's 2/5th Lancashire Fusiliers moved towards Mâlon; and the 1/7th Royal Warwickshire Regiment pushed towards St-Contest. The area had not been thoroughly cleared, and surviving Hitlerjugend troops reoccupied La Bijude, Galmanche, and the nearby trench system. Panzer IV tanks, which were based in Buron, moved forward to reinforce the frontline German infantry. The ensuing day-long battle saw mixed results, and the use of flamethrowers. Heavy casualties were suffered in the attempt to capture Épron. The approach to the village was covered by thick hedges, steep banks, and cornfields. These factors, along with Épron's location on a reverse slope from the direction of the British advance, provided excellent terrain advantage to the German defenders. As the Norfolks emerged from the cornfields, they were engaged by heavy German defensive fire. Pinned down, the men were subjected to artillery and mortar fire, which took a heavy toll. The German reoccupation of La Bijude further impeded attempts to capture Épron, as both positions were able to engage the attacking British troops. The 59th Division consolidated its hold on La Bijude and captured St-Contest; Épron fell following a German withdrawal; and Hitlerjugend retained its hold on Galmanche and Mâlon.

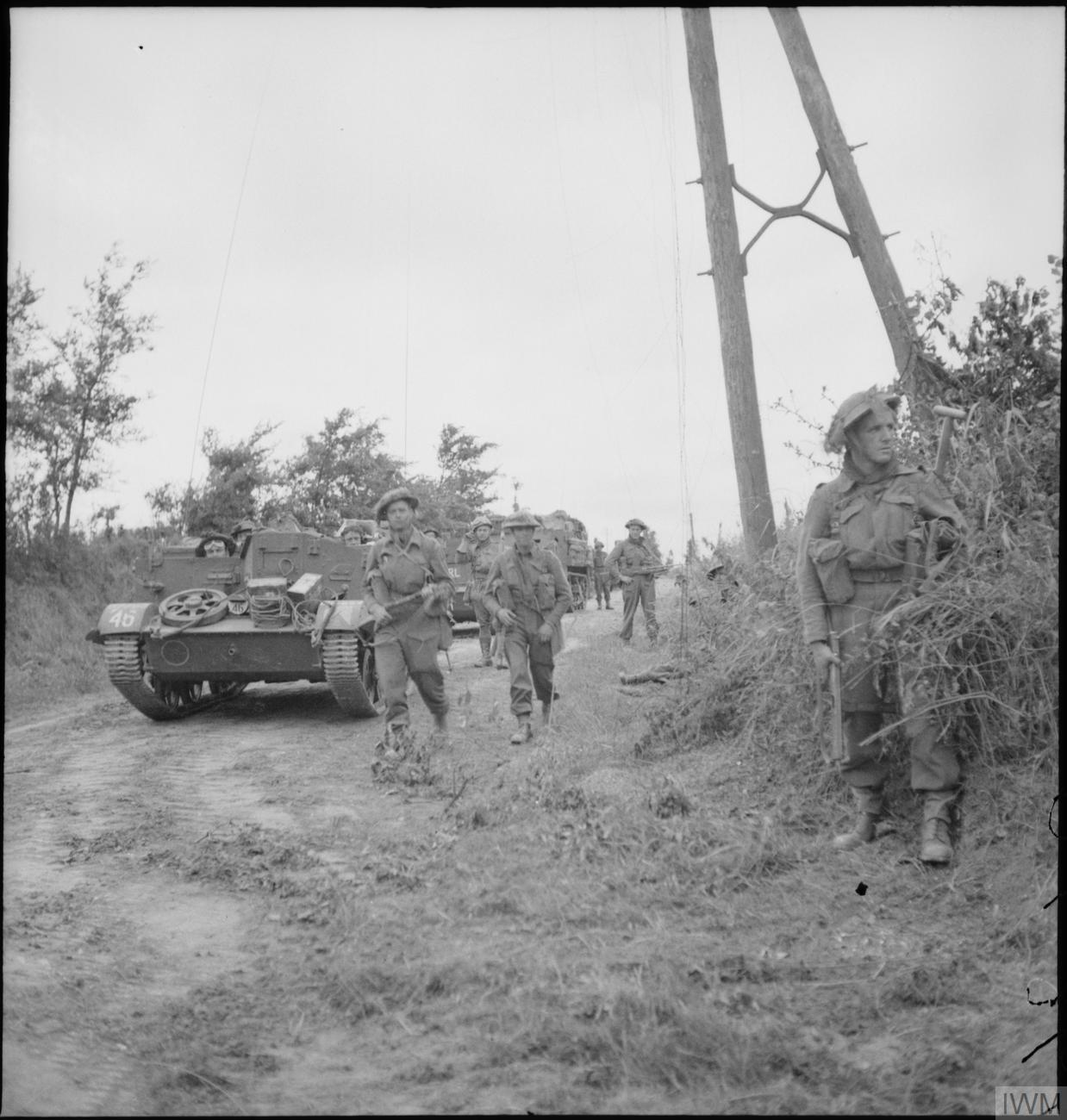
Infantry of the 59th Division near Caen

On 9 July, the 59th Division was ordered to consolidate the area it had captured and search for German holdouts, before advancing to capture the next line of German positions in the villages and farms of Bitot, Couvrechef, and La Folie. At midday, the 33rd Armoured Brigade, attached to the 3rd Infantry Division, moved across the division's line of advance and captured Couvrechef. The 3rd Infantry's advance threatened to cut off the Germans still resisting the 59th's push south. The delay in capturing Bitot also impacted moves by the Canadians, who came under fire from the German positions there. The 3rd British and 3rd Canadian Divisions entered Caen during the day. The following morning, the 59th Division moved through the villages north of the city, mopping up remaining German units, before entering the city. During the operation, the division suffered 1,200 casualties including 239 men killed. The historian John Buckley wrote "for the inexperienced troops of 59th Division for whom Charnwood was their baptism of fire, the grim and appalling realities of combat were a chastening experience."

=== Battle of Noyers ===
With Operation Charnwood over, the division was transferred to XII Corps and withdrawn into reserve. It was allowed to rest, refit, and absorb replacements; these included men who had been left out of battle – a practice intended to preserve a cadre of experienced troops and leaders, who would be able to absorb new troops and rebuild in the event of catastrophic losses. Detailed planning for the next attack, Operation Goodwood, soon began. As part of this effort, the Second Army intended to launch several diversionary attacks by XII and XXX Corps to divert German attention from the location of the main Goodwood thrust. On 13 July, the division was allocated to XXX Corps, and the next day moved into the area incorporating Loucelles, Cristot, and Fontenay-le-Pesnel in preparation for the upcoming fight. Following the move, the division was subjected to German harassing artillery fire and suffered losses. The XXX Corps attack, code-named Operation Pomegranate, would form part of the larger Second Battle of the Odon. The division's objectives were the capture of Landelle, Noyers, Missy and the nearby orchard, and the destruction of German forces within these areas. Noyers, the main objective, is north of the Odon river valley, astride the main road from Caen to Villers-Bocage. British corps commander Lieutenant-General Richard O'Connor believed that Noyers, which could not be dominated from the high ground south of the river, was key to controlling the river valley, and subsequent operations to cross the river. The area was held by the German 276th and 277th Infantry Divisions. To assist the 59th Division, it was assigned elements of the 33rd Armoured Brigade and 79th Armoured Division; the latter was a formation that provided specialist armoured vehicles as needed.

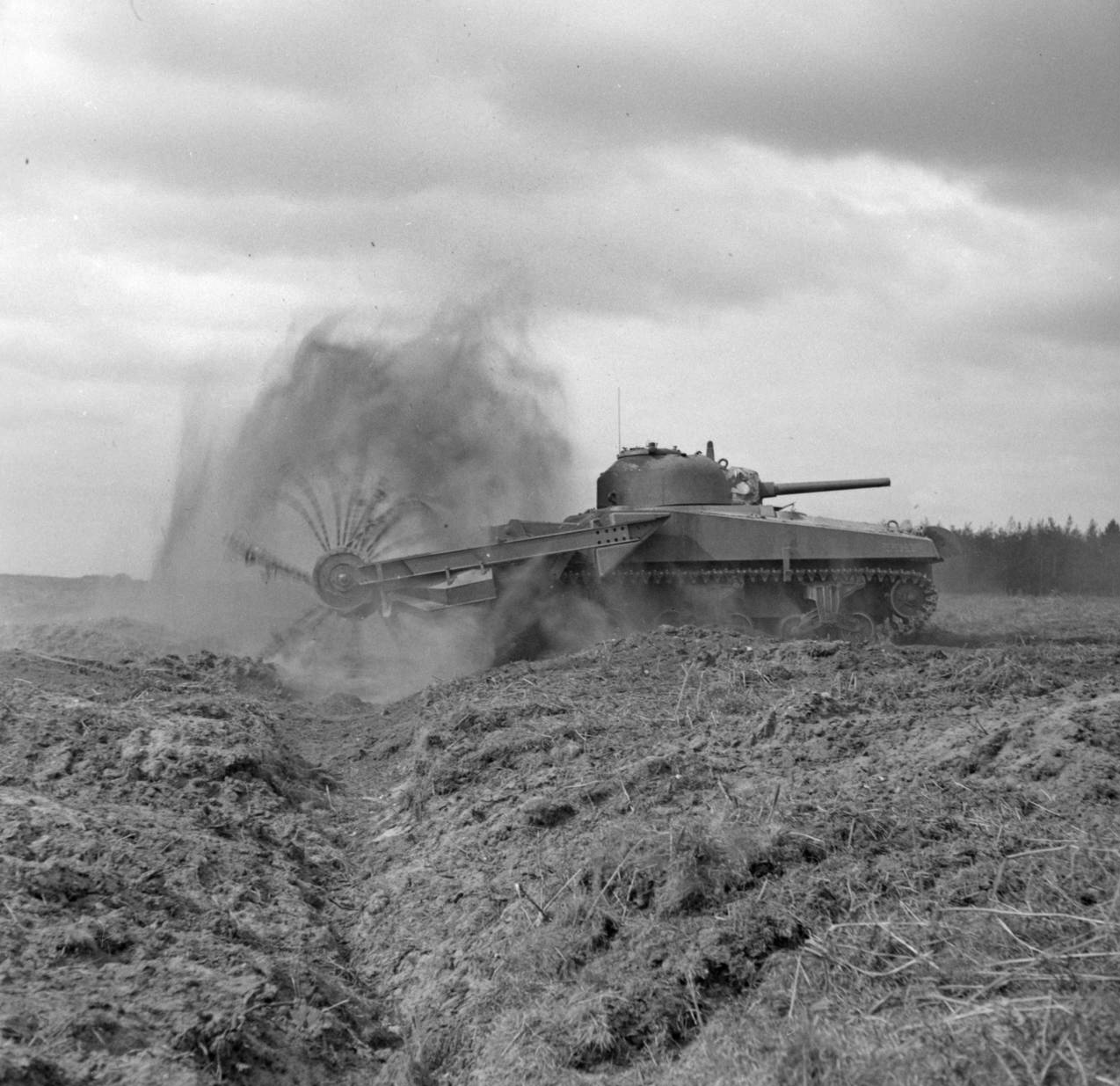
An example of a flail tank: heavy chains spin in front of the tank, pounding the ground, in an attempt to detonate buried mines.

The first phase of the attack was assigned to three battalions, from the 197th and 177th Brigades, and intended to clear several villages and farms on the approach to Noyers. On 16 July, at 05:30, the attack started. The 5th East Lancashire Regiment, on the right, met stiff German resistance which delayed their advance. By 08:00, they had reached their first objective and captured part of Vendes. Subsequent German counter-attacks, supported by tanks, overran some of the East Lancashire troops and pushed them back to their start line. Two South Staffordshire battalions, on the left flank, fared better. The 1/6SSR rapidly captured Brettevillette and Queudeville, but suffered heavy losses in the process. Further losses were suffered as a result of anti-personnel mines, and most of the battalion's supporting tanks were lost on anti-tank mines. The 5SSR captured the orchards near Grainville-sur-Odon, and then advanced to capture Les Nouillons. With most of the first-phase objectives captured, flail tanks were brought up to breach German minefields. Due to the mixed results of the initial fighting, the second phase of the attack, to secure the line Landelle-Noyers-Missy, was delayed. At 17:30, the 2/6SSR launched an attack directly against Noyers. After initial progress, against determined German resistance, they entered the village but were forced back. At 18:15, the 6NSR launched an attack towards Haut des Forges, and captured the area. After dark, the 2/5th Lancashire Fusiliers of the 197th Brigade made a second attempt to seize the uncaptured first-phase objectives. Heavy German mortar fire put a stop to this effort.

On 17 July, the 176th Brigade launched an attack towards Bordel, and captured the area the following day. The 197th Brigade made a further attempt to capture its first-phase objectives, which it finally achieved and then advanced to capture Ferme de Guiberon. Meanwhile, repeated attempts were made to take Noyers. The 1/6SSR, 2/6SSR, and 5SSR made several attempts throughout the 17th, but their attacks were defeated by the German 277th Division holding the village, which had been reinforced by the 9th-SS Panzer Division's reconnaissance battalion. The following day, the 177th Brigade launched two major attacks on Noyers that were also repulsed. Preparations were made for the 197th Brigade to assault Noyers on the 19th, but Operation Pomegranate was closed down following the launch of Goodwood. Peter Knight, author of the 59th Divisional history, wrote "The aim of Pomegranate had been to attract enemy attention ... away from the Caen Sector. In this we had succeeded, and Noyers itself had little tactical significance for us." Simon Trew, a historian, supports this position, indicating that the attacks made by XII and XXX Corps forced the Germans to keep the 2nd Panzer, 9th-SS Panzer, and 10th-SS Panzer divisions committed to the wrong sector of the battlefield and away from where Goodwood was launched. Ian Daglish, a historian, wrote "the results [of the fighting] were inconclusive", but they had the result of "keeping the defenders busy (and drawing in important parts of the elite 9. SS-Panzerdivision, Hohenstaufen)." The fighting cost the division 1,250 men killed, wounded or missing. In exchange, 575 prisoners were taken.

Following the battle, the division took over part of the front held by 49th (West Riding) Infantry Division. This resulted in all three of its brigades being committed to the frontline, to hold the entire sector. The following ten days involved manning the frontline, conducting patrols into German-held territory, engaging in small-scale skirmishing with the Germans, and mutual mortar bombardments.

=== Battle of the Orne ===
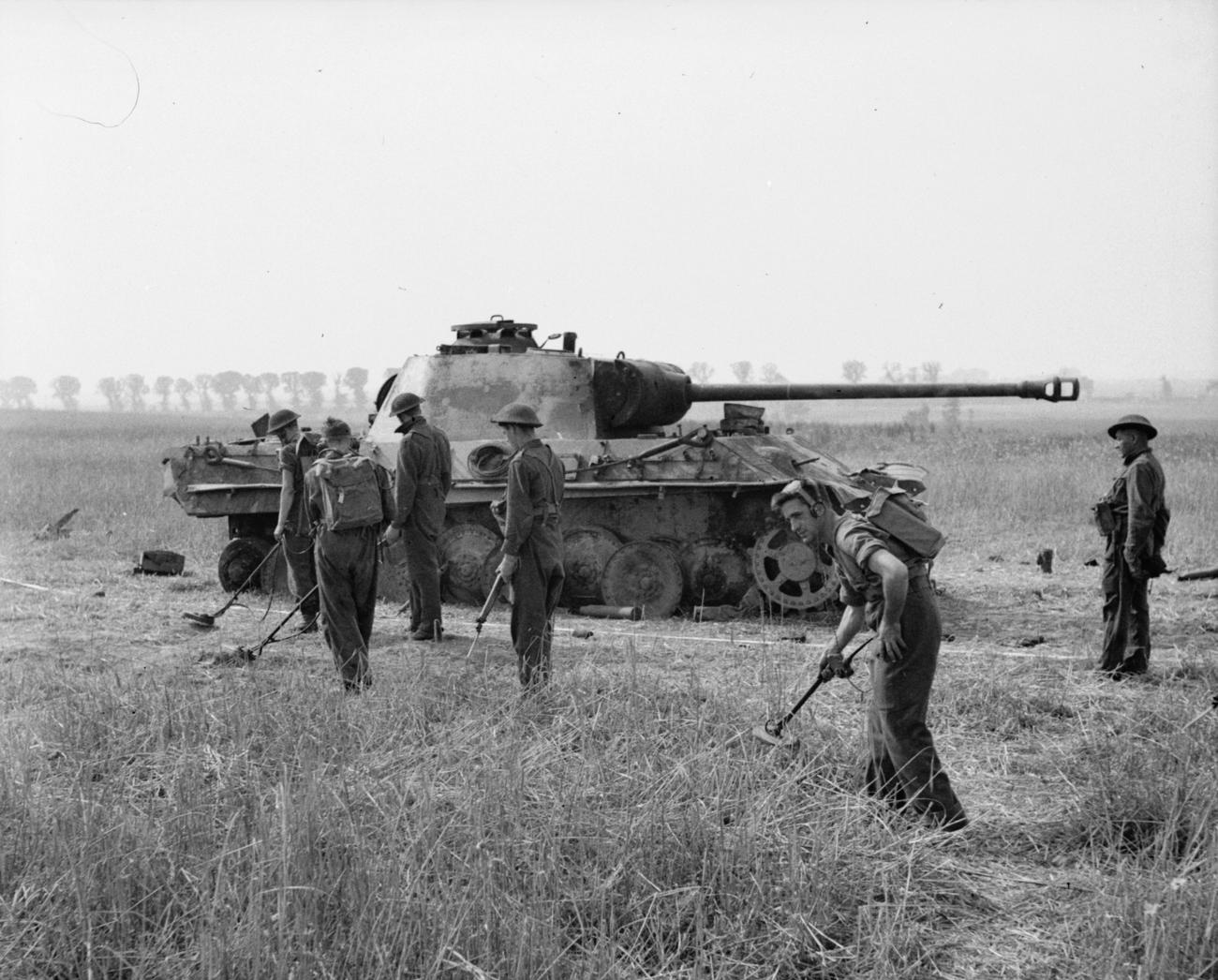
Royal Engineers sweeping for mines near Villers Bocage

On 24 July, the division returned to XII Corps. The following day, the American First Army launched a major offensive, codenamed Operation Cobra, on the western flank of the Normandy beachhead. On 27 July, Montgomery ordered the Second Army to launch a major assault west of Noyers, codenamed Operation Bluecoat, and maintain the pressure on the German forces along the rest of the front east of Noyers. As part of the latter, XII Corps was to push towards the Orne River. The task assigned to the 59th Division was to clear the area around Villers-Bocage, and then exploit towards Thury-Harcourt on the Orne and attempt to establish a bridgehead.

On 29 July, as a preliminary to any major move and to improve the division's position, the 197th Brigade launched an attack on Juvigny. In a three-day battle for the village, the brigade suffered 402 casualties. On 3 August, following German withdrawals along XII Corps' front, the division advanced, supported by elements of the 34th Tank Brigade. The 197th led the attack, encountering German forces north of Villers-Bocage; however, the Germans soon withdrew and the town was captured without any fighting. On 4 August, the 176th Brigade took over the lead and engaged German forces near the Orne, losing several of their supporting tanks in the process. Churchill AVRE tanks were moved up to engage and destroy German strongpoints. The northern riverbank was secured by nightfall. Patrols and reconnaissance missions were launched across the river, but a major effort was not conducted until the evening of 6 August. Near Ouffières, elements of the 176th Brigade waded across the river, initially achieving surprise by using decoy smokescreens. A Bailey bridge was erected, allowing the remainder of the brigade to cross as well as two squadrons of Churchill tanks from the 107th Regiment Royal Armoured Corps, part of the 34th Tank Brigade. Resistance to the crossing soon intensified, and the German 271st Infantry Division launched several counter-attacks that failed to dislodge the 59th, although it did result in some British positions being overrun. The division captured Grimbosq, and further German counter-attacks were launched over the next two days, which included elements of the Hitlerjugend. During these engagements, several German tanks were knocked out by the division's anti-tank guns, and several of the supporting Churchill tanks were lost.

The 36-hour battle the division fought once across the Orne resulted in the Victoria Cross (VC) being awarded to Captain David Jamieson of the 7th Royal Norfolk Regiment. Despite having been severely wounded and evacuated from the battlefield, Jamieson returned to the frontline to direct and inspire his men, reporting targets and ordering artillery strikes. His VC citation stated: "He personally was largely responsible for the holding of this important bridgehead over the River Orne and for the repulse of seven German counter-attacks with great loss to the enemy." The Norfolks, who bore the brunt of the fighting, lost 226 men. German losses were reported to be heavy, and at least 200 prisoners were taken by the brigade.

Lyne praised the brigade "... for the magnificent fight which they successfully waged in the Orne bridgehead", and commented that the front "is literally strewn with bodies of men of the 12th S.S. Division, killed during their repeated counter-attacks, which you so ably repulsed." Buckley described the division as having "battled hard in generally non-glamorous roles", and in this particular battle "displayed grit, determination and intelligence in securing and holding a crossing over the River Orne". More critically, as part of an examination of the Second Army's morale by the end of July, David French stated at least seven men of the 2/6SSR were found guilty of mutiny for refusing to follow orders, and at least eight members of the 2/5th Lancashire Fusiliers were found with self-inflicted wounds.

=== Final fighting and disbandment ===
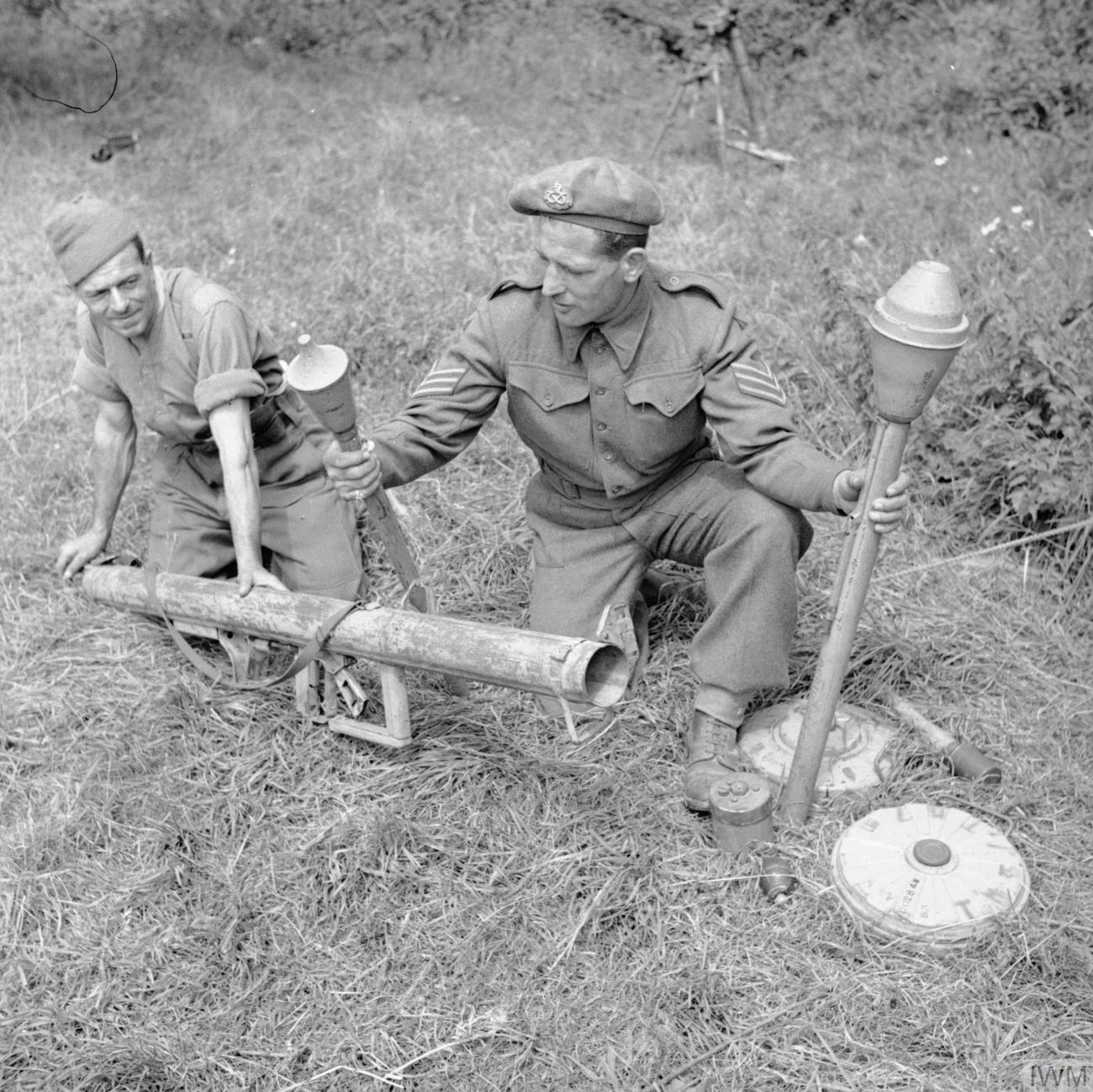
Instructors at the division's battle school, at Vienne-en-Bessin, demonstrate various German weapons.

By mid-1944, the British Army was facing a manpower crisis as it did not have enough men to replace the losses suffered by frontline infantry units. While efforts were made to address this, such as transferring men from the Royal Artillery and the Royal Air Force to be retrained as infantry, the War Office began disbanding formations and transferring their men to other units to keep these as close to full strength as possible. This policy impacted the division shortly after the fighting along the Orne. Due to heavy losses within the division, as well as the 21st Army Group as a whole, along with a lack of infantry replacements, a reorganization was undertaken. An infantry battalion from each of the 177th and the 197th Brigades was disbanded, and these were replaced by battalions from the 176th Brigade. The remaining battalion of the 176th was also broken up, rendering the brigade non-existent, although it was not officially disbanded. The troops from the disbanded units were used to reinforce other formations to bring them up to strength. The 56th Independent Infantry Brigade, a formation under the direct command of the 21st Army Group, was temporarily assigned to the division on 5 August to bring the division back up to three brigades. The brigade consisted of the 2nd Battalion, South Wales Borderers, the 2nd Battalion, Gloucestershire Regiment (2nd Glosters), and the 2nd Battalion, 2nd Essex Regiment (2nd Essex).

The German 271st Infantry Division maintained its position around the 59th Division's bridgehead, and was able to make use of the rugged terrain north of Thury-Harcourt in its defensive effort. On 8 August, the 177th Brigade opened up the new phase of fighting. The brigade suffered casualties in an unsuccessful attempt to push south along the west bank of the Orne. Meanwhile, the 56th Brigade crossed the Orne near Brieux, 3 miles (5 km) north of Thury-Harcourt. The next day, the 197th Brigade renewed the effort to expand the bridgehead by attacking south-east; Knight described this as "literally uphill fighting". The brigade was able to push through the German positions and secure the area around La Moissonière and Le Mesnil, a few miles north of Thury-Harcourt. Meanwhile, the 56th Brigade attacked south; taking the village of La Forge a Cambro, south of the 197th Brigade's positions, on the last ridge before Thury-Harcourt and captured upwards of 200 prisoners. Patrols from the brigade entered Thury-Harcourt by midnight and found it to be still held by the Germans.

Efforts on 11 August by the 56th Brigade to take the town were thwarted, as were efforts by the 177th Brigade to force the Orne. While the 56th Brigade advanced south, securing the area around the village of Esson, south of Thury-Harcourt, the 53rd (Welsh) Infantry Division crossed the Orne further south. Between the lead elements of that division and the 56th Brigade, Thury-Harcourt was almost completely surrounded. The historian Andrew Holborn described some of the fighting during this period: "... vicious actions fought within [the confines of wooded areas]. At one stage German forces armed with a preponderance of automatic weapons overran a platoon of 2nd Essex, and the situation could only be restored by the use of heavy artillery." In another instance "there was hand-to-hand fighting", with friendly fire from artillery and mortars "bursting in the trees". Despite their precarious position, German resistance did not dissipate. German artillery bombarded British positions, while German infantry conducted counterattacks and attempted to retake lost villages.

By 12 August, Thury-Harcourt was believed to have been evacuated. The final attack was launched by the 2nd Glosters who had to navigate steeply descending terrain into the town. On the outskirts they were heavily engaged by German artillery and gunfire. German counter-attacks were also launched on other elements of the 56th Brigade during this period. The 2nd Glosters fought their way into the town, and engaged in house to house fighting to clear the strongly defended German positions that included at least one tank. By the end of the day, the battalion withdrew from the town that was now widely burning. The German defenders withdrew under the cover of darkness, and the battalion re-entered the town on 14 August to sweep for German holdouts and clear booby traps. The historian Terry Copp argued that the fighting the division took part in, a "five-day period of intense combat", has not been given "the attention it deserves". Copp, arguing against the Canadian official historian Charles Perry Stacey's criticism of Canadian forces being too slow during Operation Totalize, wrote

Stacey has little to say about the slow progress of British forces ... or the inability of the 59th British Division to advance out of its bridgehead ... Perhaps it is time to recognize that there was no easy solution to the problems posed by an enemy that continued to wage a determined defensive battle even as its combat forces withered away.

Following a short break, during which the division undertook patrols, the 59th joined the fighting around what would become known as the Falaise Pocket. On 16 August, the 197th Brigade reached Ouilly. Two days later, the 177th Brigade took Les Isles-Bardel following a brief engagement that ended as the Germans withdrew as part of their general retreat, before they could inflict a serious delay. On the 19th, the 56th Brigade was withdrawn from the division. Further efforts by the 177th Brigade to advance were impeded by German resistance over the course of the next two days. Once overcome, a more rapid advance was made.

By August 1944, the manpower crisis had come to a head. In the United Kingdom, the vast majority of available replacements had already been dispatched to reinforce the 21st Army Group. By 7 August, a mere 2,654 fully trained and combat-ready men remained in the UK awaiting deployment. In an effort to maintain the frontline infantry strength across the 21st Army Group, Montgomery made the decision to cannibalise the 59th Division. He sent a telegram to Alan Brooke, which read: "Regret time has come when I must break up one Inf Div. My Inf Divs are so low in effective rifle strength that they can no (repeat no) longer fight effectively in major operations. Request permission to break up at once 59 Div."

The historian Carlo D'Este wrote that the division "had been selected because it was the junior division in the 21st Army Group and not as a result of its performance in battle." Once the decision was made, senior commanders within the 21st Army Group sent letters of appreciation to the division, and Montgomery personally visited the division's senior officers. The historian Stephen Hart wrote that towards "the end of the Normandy campaign, significant morale problems had emerged in as many as seven of the 21st Army Group's total of sixteen divisions" and that the remainder, which included the 59th, were rated by the 21st Army Group senior commanders "as completely reliable for offensive operations." On 26 August, the men of the division were dispersed among the other formations across the 21st Army Group. The 197th Brigade was not disbanded, instead, it was transformed into a battlefield clearance unit. In this new role of organising the clearance of all leftover equipment from battlefields, the brigade was assigned men from the Royal Army Ordnance Corps, Royal Electrical and Mechanical Engineers, and the Royal Pioneer Corps in lieu of the infantry it had lost. (Note: The brigade was given responsibility for collecting the enormous quantities of salvage that were left following the conclusion of the fighting around the Falaise Pocket. Depots for captured enemy stores were established at Cormelles-le-Royal for the area south of the Seine and at Amiens for north of the Seine. Top priority was given to collecting jerry cans, which were in short supply. Around 5,000 horses were captured, which were given to French farmers. By 26 September, 22,190 tonnes (21,840 long tons) of salvage had been collected and turned over to ordnance depots.) The division was not formally disbanded until 19 October 1944. Lyne was subsequently given command of the 50th (Northumbrian) Infantry Division in October, and one month later the 7th Armoured Division. The 59th Division was not re-raised post-war, when the TA was reformed in 1947. (Note: In 1947, the TA was reformed with the 16th Airborne Division, the 49th (West Riding) and 56th (London) Armoured Divisions, and the following infantry divisions: 42nd (Lancashire), 43rd (Wessex), 44th (Home Counties), 50th (Northumbrian), 51st/52nd (Scottish), and 53rd (Welsh).)

== General officers commanding ==
The division had the following commanders:

Appointed	Name
15 September 1939	Major-General John Blakiston-Houston
1 December 1939	Major-General Ralph Eastwood
11 May 1940	Major-General Frederick Witts
15 February 1941	Major-General James Steele
8 April 1942	Major-General William Bradshaw
29 March 1944	Major-General Lewis Lyne

== Order of battle ==
59th (Staffordshire) Motor Division (September 1939 – June 1940)

176th Infantry Brigade

- 7th Battalion, South Staffordshire Regiment
- 6th Battalion, North Staffordshire Regiment
- 7th Battalion, North Staffordshire Regiment

177th Infantry Brigade

- 5th Battalion, South Staffordshire Regiment
- 1/6th Battalion, South Staffordshire Regiment
- 2/6th Battalion, South Staffordshire Regiment

Divisional Troops

- 59th (Staffordshire) Divisional artillery, Royal Artillery
  - 61st (North Midland) Field Regiment
  - 116th (North Midland) Field Regiment
  - 66th Anti-Tank Regiment (from 17 November 1939)
- 59th (Staffordshire) Divisional engineers, Royal Engineers
  - 511th Field Park Company (from 30 December 1939)
  - 509th Field Company (from 11 January 1940)
  - 510th Field Company (from 2 March 1940)
- 59th (Motor) Divisional Signals, Royal Corps of Signals (until May 1940)
- 6th Battalion, Loyal Regiment (North Lancashire) (Motorcycle Battalion)

59th (Staffordshire) Infantry Division (June 1940 onwards)

176th Infantry Brigade

- 7th Battalion, South Staffordshire Regiment
- 6th Battalion, North Staffordshire Regiment
- 7th Battalion, North Staffordshire Regiment (until 14 October 1942)
- 176th Infantry Brigade Anti-Tank Company (13 July until 31 December 1940)
- 7th Battalion, Royal Norfolk Regiment (from 14 October 1942)

177th Infantry Brigade

- 5th Battalion, South Staffordshire Regiment
- 1/6th Battalion, South Staffordshire Regiment
- 2/6th Battalion, South Staffordshire Regiment
- 177th Infantry Brigade Anti-Tank Company (13 July until 31 December 1940)

197th Infantry Brigade

- 2/5th Battalion, Lancashire Fusiliers
- 2/6th Battalion, Lancashire Fusiliers (until 4 October 1942)
- 5th Battalion, East Lancashire Regiment
- 197th Infantry Brigade Anti-Tank Company (from 13 July until 31 December 1940)
- 1/7th Battalion, Royal Warwickshire Regiment (from 4 October 1942)

34th Army Tank Brigade (from 16 September 1943 until 22 January 1944)

- 147th Regiment, Royal Armoured Corps
- 151st Battalion, Royal Armoured Corps
- 153rd Regiment, Royal Armoured Corps

Divisional Troops

- 59th (Staffordshire) Divisional artillery, Royal Artillery
  - 61st (North Midland) Field Regiment
  - 116th (North Midland) Field Regiment
  - 110th (Manchester) Field Regiment (from 10 July 1940)
  - 68th Anti-Tank Regiment (from 1 July 1940)
  - 68th Light Anti-Aircraft Regiment (from 19 April 1943)
- 59th (Staffordshire) Divisional Engineers, Royal Engineers
  - 509th Field Company
  - 510th Field Company
  - 257th Field Company
  - 511th Field Park Company
  - 24th Bridging Platoon (from 1 October 1943)
- 59th (Staffordshire) Divisional Signals, Royal Corps of Signals
- 7th Battalion, Royal Northumberland Fusiliers (Machine Gun Battalion, from 18 November 1941 to 1 October 1942. The battalion was then reorganised as the divisional support battalion; a role it maintained until 27 February 1944, when it reverted to being the division's machine gun battalion.)
- 59th Battalion, Reconnaissance Corps (from 27 January 1941, until 5 June 1942) (Note: In June 1942, the Reconnaissance Corps universally adopted cavalry nomenclature. As a result, all battalions were redesignated as regiments.)
- 59th Reconnaissance Regiment, Royal Armoured Corps (from 6 June 1942, until 31 December 1943)

== See also ==
- British Army during the Second World War
- British Army Order of Battle (September 1939)
- British logistics in the Normandy Campaign
- List of British divisions in World War II

== Notes ==
Footnotes

Citations
