= 197th (Lancashire Fusiliers) Brigade =

2/1st Lancashire Fusiliers Brigade 197th (2/1st Lancashire Fusiliers) Brigade 197th Brigade 197th Infantry Brigade 197th Infantry Brigade (Battlefield Clearance)
- Active: 1914–1919; 1939–1944
- Country: United Kingdom
- Branch: Territorial Army
- Type: Infantry
- Size: Brigade
- Part of: 66th (2nd East Lancashire) Division; 42nd (East Lancashire) Infantry Division; 66th Infantry Division; 59th (Staffordshire) Infantry Division
- Engagements: First World War; Second World War

The 197th (2/1st Lancashire Fusiliers) Brigade was an infantry brigade formation of the British Army that saw distinguished active service in both the First and Second world wars.

== First World War ==
The brigade, originally the 2/1st Lancashire Fusiliers Brigade, was created in late August 1914 during the early stages of the First World War as a duplicate formation of the Lancashire Fusiliers Brigade and was part of the 2nd East Lancashire Division, the division itself formed as a duplicate of East Lancashire Division. The brigade, composed of four 2nd Line battalions of the Lancashire Fusiliers, was formed from those comparatively few men already serving in the Territorial Force before the war who originally had wished not to serve overseas as, according to the Territorial and Reserve Forces Act 1907, soldiers of the TF were not obliged to serve overseas without their consent. The brigade was intended to act as a reserve for the 1st Line units serving overseas, to send drafts of replacements for battle casualties.

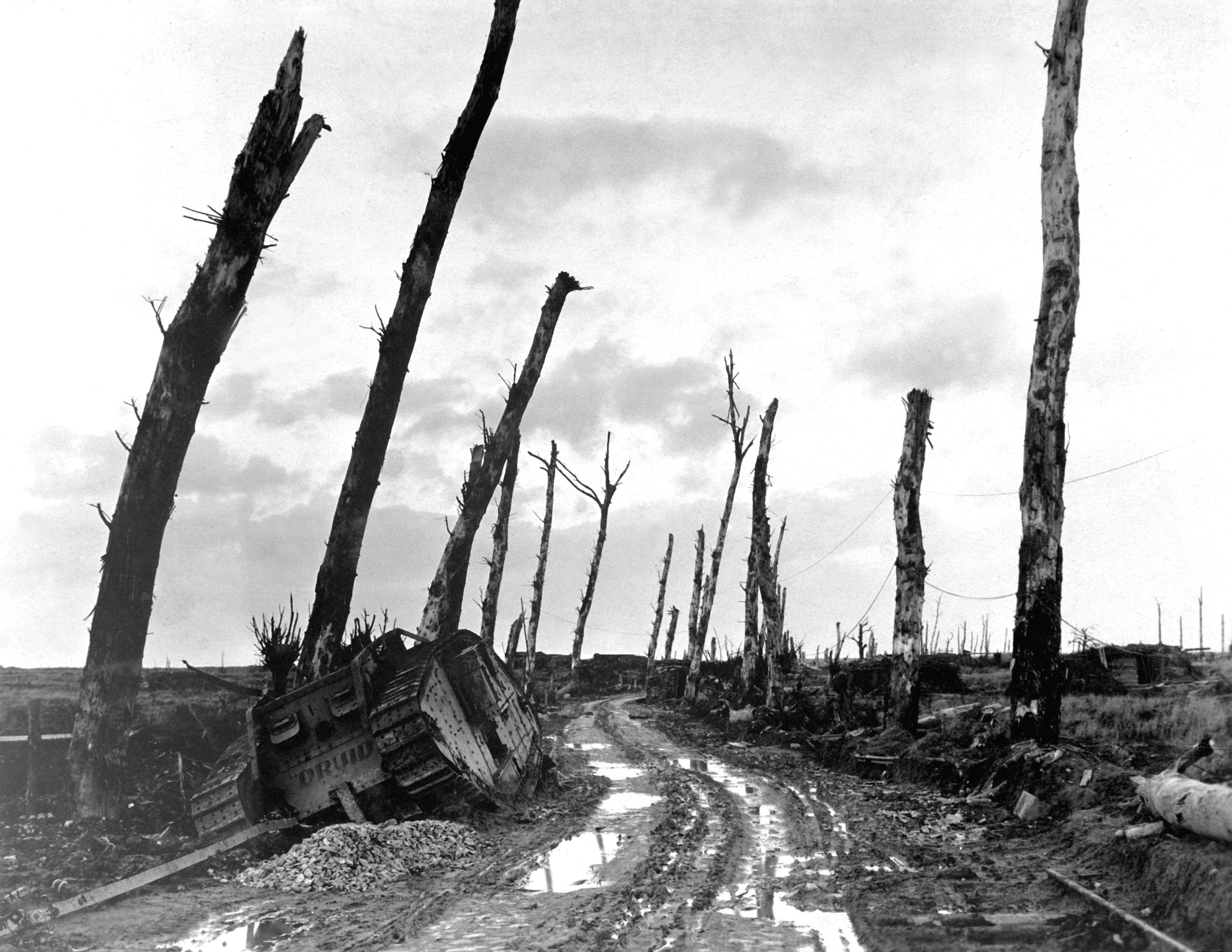
Street corner in Poelcappelle in 1917.

Throughout 1915 all divisions of the Territorial Force were given numbers and so, in August 1915, the 2nd East Lancashire Division was numbered as the 66th (2nd East Lancashire) Division and the brigades were also numbered, the 2/1st Lancashire Fusiliers Brigade being numbered as the 197th (2/1st Lancashire Fusiliers) Brigade.

In early 1916, conscription was introduced and the Military Service Act 1916, which swept aside the distinction between 'Home Service' men and those volunteering for foreign service and, as a result, the brigade and division began training for eventual service overseas.

On 11 February 1917 the 197th Brigade, together with the rest of the 66th (2nd East Lancashire) Division, received orders to prepare for a move overseas to France and left two weeks later, arriving by 16 March. They were destined to serve with the rest of the British Expeditionary Force (BEF) in the trenches of the Western Front and ended up seeing its first battle during Operation Hush and later the Battle of Poelcappelle, part of the Battle of Passchendaele (also known as the Third Battle of Ypres).

Due to a manpower shortage in the BEF serving on the Western Front in early 1918, all British divisions in France and Belgium were reduced from twelve to nine infantry battalions, and so, as a result, the 3/5th Lancashire Fusiliers was disbanded and the men posted to other battalions of the regiment.

In March 1918, together with the rest of 66th (2nd East Lancashire) Division, the brigade suffered extremely high casualties during Operation Michael, the opening phase of the German Army's Spring Offensive. Such were the heavy casualties received by the brigade that it was reduced to a cadre and became a training brigade and saw no more active service for the rest of the war. The brigade was replaced in the 66th (2nd East Lancashire) Division by the 1st South African Brigade. The war came to an end on 11 November 1918 with the signing of the Armistice and, in 1919, the brigade was disbanded.

=== Order of battle ===
The 197th Brigade was constituted as follows during the First World War:

- 2/5th Battalion, Lancashire Fusiliers (left 18 April 1915)
- 2/6th Battalion, Lancashire Fusiliers (became 6th Battalion 20 February 1918, left 22 July 1918)
- 2/7th Battalion, Lancashire Fusiliers (left 30 June 1918)
- 2/8th Battalion, Lancashire Fusiliers (disbanded 31 July 1918)
- 3/5th Battalion, Lancashire Fusiliers (from April 1915, disbanded 13 February 1918)
- 202nd Machine Gun Company, Machine Gun Corps (moved to 66th Battalion, Machine Gun Corps 11 March 1918)
- 197th Trench Mortar Battery
- 6th (Service) Battalion, Royal Dublin Fusiliers (from 21 July 1918, left 19 August 1918)
- 9th (Service) Battalion, Gloucestershire Regiment (from 21 July 1918, left to become Divisional pioneer battalion 22 September 1918)
- 18th (Service) Battalion, King's (Liverpool Regiment) (from 8 August until 19 September 1918)

== Second World War ==
After the First World War, both the brigade and division were disbanded, along with the rest of the Territorial Force. However, in the 1920s, the Territorial Army was formed, on a similar basis to the Territorial Force. By March 1939, another war in Europe seemed inevitable and so the Territorial Army was ordered to be doubled in size. The brigade came into existence again, now designated as the 197th Infantry Brigade, and became part of the 66th Infantry Division, which was formed as a duplicate of 42nd (East Lancashire) Infantry Division, and the brigade was formed as a duplicate of 125th Infantry Brigade.

The Second World War began on 3 September 1939, however the division only lasted until June 1940 when it was broken up. With the disbandment the division, the 197th Brigade (with 257th Field Company, RE and 110th Field Regiment, RA under command) was transferred to the 59th (Staffordshire) Motor Division (two brigades) when it was reformed as an infantry division (three brigades). With the rest of the 59th Division, which was based in North-East England under Northern Command, the brigade began training to repel a German invasion of England.

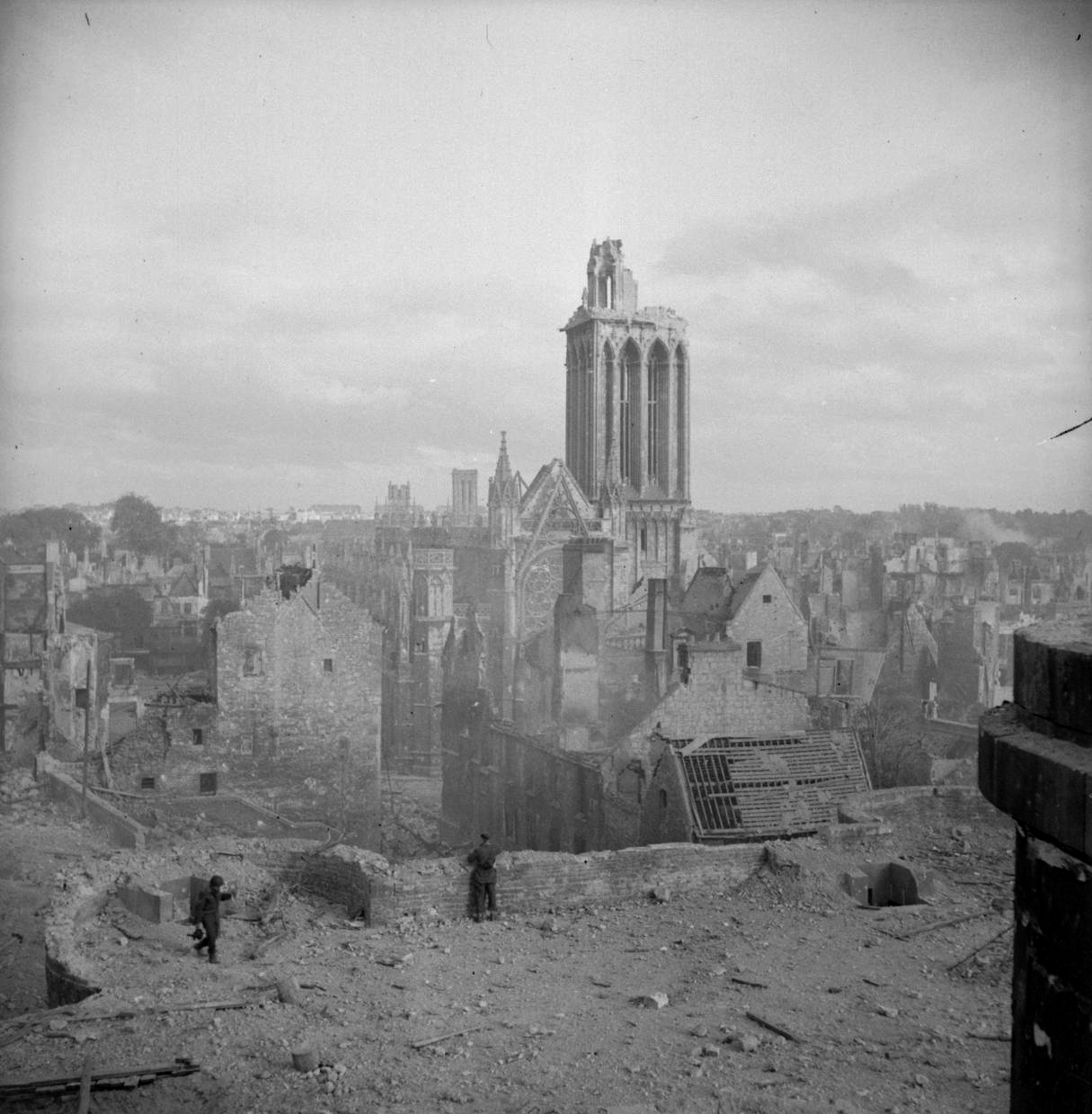
The aftermath of the bombing of Caen on 7 July 1944.

In June 1942 the brigade, along with the rest of the 59th Division, was transferred to Northern Ireland, where they came under command of British Troops Northern Ireland and began training alongside the troops of the United States Army (who had entered the war in December 1941) stationed there in numerous large-scale military exercises. Later in the year the brigade was slightly reorganised with the addition of the 1/7th Battalion, Royal Warwickshire Regiment which arrived from 143rd Brigade to replace the 2/6th Lancashire Fusiliers, which transferred to the 211th Brigade. The battalion had already seen active service over two years before in France and Dunkirk, one of few units in the 59th Division to do so. In March 1943 the brigade returned to the mainland again, and soon found itself in Kent.

After spending many years training in the United Kingdom the 197th Brigade, together with the rest of the 59th Division, landed in France on 29 June 1944, D-Day + 23. The division, under command of XII Corps, became part of the British Second Army, which was engaged in the Battle for Caen. With the arrival of the 59th Division General Bernard Montgomery, commanding the Anglo-Canadian 21st Army Group, decided to renew the offensive to capture the city of Caen, which was originally a D-Day objective for the British 3rd Infantry Division which ultimately failed, due mainly to heavier resistance than expected. Operation Charnwood. The brigade's first action was Operation Charnwood with 2/6th South Staffords (of 177th Brigade), along with C Company of the 7th Battalion, Royal Northumberland Fusiliers (the divisional MG Battalion), together with numerous units of the Royal Artillery under command (and 510 Field Company, RE), and supported by the Churchill tanks of the 1st East Riding Yeomanry (of 27th Armoured Brigade). The brigade suffered comparatively light casualties in Charnwood. The 197th Brigade later fought in the Second Battle of the Odon, and the Battle of the Falaise Gap.

In late August 1944, however, both the brigade and division were broken up. This was due to a combination of heavy casualties being suffered in all British divisions in Normandy and a severe shortage of infantrymen throughout the British Army and the men of the brigade were sent as replacements to other British divisions in the 21st Army Group, either individually or with their platoons or companies (for example, two whole companies of the 1/7th Royal Warwicks were sent to the 2nd Battalion of 185th Brigade, British 3rd Division).

=== Order of battle ===
197th Infantry Brigade was constituted as follows during the Second World War:

- 2/5th Battalion, Lancashire Fusiliers
- 2/6th Battalion, Lancashire Fusiliers (left 4 October 1942)
- 5th Battalion, East Lancashire Regiment (from 3 September 1939)
- 197th Infantry Brigade Anti-Tank Company (formed 13 July, disbanded 31 December 1940)
- 1/7th Battalion, Royal Warwickshire Regiment (from 4 October 1942)

=== Commanders ===
The following officers commanded 197th Brigade during the war:

- Brigadier S.T. Lucey (until 2 May 1941)
- Brigadier G.A. Pilleau (from 2 May 1941 until 16 April 1942)
- Brigadier J. Lingham (from 16 April 1942)

== Bibliography ==
- Joslen, H. F. (2003) [1960]. Orders of Battle: Second World War, 1939–1945. Uckfield, East Sussex: Naval and Military Press. ISBN 978-1-84342-474-1.
