= James Steele (British Army officer) =

British Army general

General Sir James Steele GCB KBE DSO MC
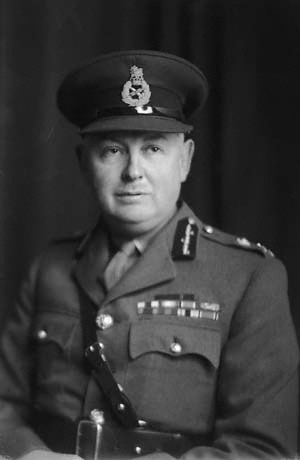
- Born: 26 October 1894; Ballycarry, County Antrim, Ireland
- Died: 24 July 1975 (aged 80); Stourpaine, Dorset, England
- Spouse: Janet Gibson Gordon
- Military career
- Allegiance: United Kingdom
- Branch: British Army
- Service years: 1914–1950
- Rank: General
- Nickname: "Daddy"
- Service number: 9429
- Units: Royal Irish Rifles; Sherwood Foresters
- Commands: British Troops in Austria (1946–47); II Corps (1942); 59th (Staffordshire) Infantry Division (1941–42); 132nd Infantry Brigade (1939–41); 1st Battalion, Sherwood Foresters (1937–39)
- Conflicts: First World War; Arab revolt in Palestine; Second World War
- Awards: Knight Grand Cross of the Order of the Bath; Knight Commander of the Order of the British Empire; Companion of the Distinguished Service Order; Military Cross; Mentioned in Despatches

General Sir James Stuart Steele, GCB, KBE, DSO, MC (26 October 1894 – 24 July 1975) was a senior British Army officer who served as Adjutant-General to the Forces.

== Early life and military career ==
Born in Ballycarry, County Antrim and educated at the Royal Belfast Academical Institution and at Queen's University Belfast, Steele was gazetted as a temporary second lieutenant in the Royal Irish Rifles, on 26 September 1914 during the First World War and posted to the 7th (Service) Battalion. He served on the Western Front from 1915 to 1917. He served at the battles of Messines, Somme and at Passchendaele. He was given a regular commission in June 1916. He was mentioned in despatches in April 1917 and was awarded the Military Cross in August 1917. Steele served the rest of the war in India and was mentioned in despatches again. The citation for his MC reads:

For conspicuous gallantry and devotion to duty in volunteering to go out and clear up the situation when the battalion was suffering severe casualties and no messages had got back from the front line. By crawling from shell hole to shell hole he got in touch with all companies, and brought back good information.

== Between the wars ==
Steele stayed in the army and attended the Staff College, Quetta from 1927 to 1928. He was promoted to brevet lieutenant colonel on 1 July 1936 and transferred to the Sherwood Foresters and was made a lieutenant colonel on 14 October 1937. Steele commanded the 1st Battalion, Sherwood Foresters from 1937 to 1939: the battalion was deployed to Jamaica in 1937 and to Palestine during the Arab revolt in Palestine in 1939. Returning to England, he was promoted to colonel on 27 June 1939 and made Assistant Adjutant-General at the War Office on the same date.

== Second World War ==
In July 1939, Steele was posted to the mobilization branch of the War Office Staff. He signed the executive signal for the mobilization of the army. He was promoted to brigadier on 8 November 1939 and took over command of the 132nd Infantry Brigade in November 1939. He served in France and Belgium in 1940 and was appointed a Companion of the Distinguished Service Order (DSO) for his part in the engagement on the River Escaut and the subsequent withdrawal to Dunkirk.

Promoted to the acting rank of major-general on 15 February 1941, he became General Officer Commanding (GOC) of the 59th (Staffordshire) Infantry Division, a second line TA formation. His major-general's rank was made temporary on 15 February 1942. Made an acting lieutenant-general on 8 April 1942, he commanded II Corps until September when he became Deputy Chief of Staff for Middle East Command in 1942. He returned to England and was then appointed Director of Staff Duties at the War Office in 1943, and was made a Companion of the Order of the Bath (CB) on 14 October 1943. He was promoted to major general on 20 September 1944 (with seniority backdated to 4 January 1944).

== Postwar ==
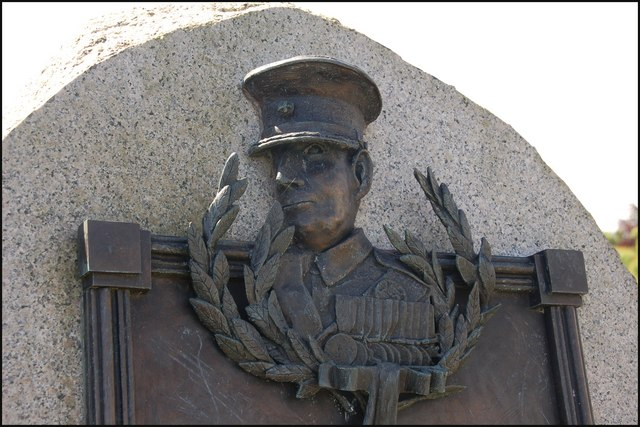
Monument to James Steele in Ballycarry, 2007

Steele was promoted to lieutenant general in 1946. He was appointed Commander-in-Chief (C-in-C) and High Commissioner in Austria in 1946. In that capacity he signed a treaty with Marshal Tito. He was promoted to general in 1947. He was Adjutant-General to the Forces from 1947 to 1950 when he retired from the British Army.

Steele was appointed a Companion of the Order of the Bath in 1943, a Knight Commander of the Order of the Bath in 1949 and a Knight Grand Cross of the Order of the Bath in 1950. He was also appointed a Knight Commander of the Order of the British Empire in 1946. He was colonel of the Royal Ulster Rifles from 1947 to 1957.

== Family ==
Steele married Janet Gibson Gordon. They had two daughters.

== Bibliography ==
- Smart, Nick (2005). Biographical Dictionary of British Generals of the Second World War. Barnesley: Pen & Sword. ISBN 1844150496.

Military offices
Preceded by Frederick Witts	GOC 59th (Staffordshire) Infantry Division; 1941–1942	Succeeded by William Bradshaw
Preceded by Kenneth Anderson	GOC II Corps; April–September 1942	Succeeded by Gerald Templer
Preceded by Sir Richard McCreery	GOC British Troops in Austria; 1946–1947	Succeeded by Sir Alexander Galloway
Preceded by Sir Richard O'Connor	Adjutant General; 1947–1950	Succeeded by Sir John Crocker
Honorary titles
Preceded by Sir Denis Bernard	Colonel of the Royal Ulster Rifles; 1947–1957	Succeeded by Henry Good
