= John Blakiston-Houston (British Army officer) =

British Army officer (1881–1959)

Major-General John Blakiston-Houston CB DSO DL
- Born: 18 April 1881
- Died: 16 December 1959 (aged 77)
- Military career
- Allegiance: United Kingdom
- Branch: British Army
- Service years: 1899–1942
- Rank: Major-General
- Nickname: "Mike"
- Service number: 566
- Unit: 11th Hussars
- Commands: Midland Area (1940–1941); 59th (Staffordshire) Infantry Division (1939); Army School of Equitation (1934–1938); 2nd Cavalry Brigade (1927–1931); 12th Royal Lancers (1923–1927)
- Conflicts: Second Boer War; First World War; Second World War
- Awards: Companion of the Order of the Bath; Distinguished Service Order; Mentioned in Despatches

Major-General John Matthew Blakiston-Houston, CB, DSO, DL (18 April 1881 − 16 December 1959) was a senior British Army officer.

== Military career ==
Blakiston-Houston transferred from the militia into the 11th Hussars on 15 February 1902, after a period on probation when he served with a cavalry regiment. He was promoted to lieutenant in September 1904.

He served in the First World War as deputy assistant adjutant and quartermaster-general for the 3rd Cavalry Division and then as assistant adjutant and quartermaster-general for the 1st Cavalry Division.

After graduating from the Staff College, Camberley, in 1919, Blakiston-Houston was promoted to lieutenant colonel and became commanding officer of the 12th Royal Lancers in September 1923, commander of the 2nd Cavalry Brigade in October 1927, and Chief Administration Officer, Northern Command in November 1931, for which he was granted the temporary rank of brigadier.

Subsequently, he became commandant of the Army School of Equitation in Weedon Bec in August 1934, was promoted to major general on 20 February 1935, before retiring from the army in August 1938. In 1937, the year before his retirement, he was considered for the command of the Mobile Division, later the 1st Armoured Division, but Leslie Hore-Belisha, the Secretary of State for War, rejected the idea, believing that all Blakiston-Houston could do was "slap his thigh and shout".

Blakiston-Houston was recalled to become General Officer Commanding (GOC) of the GOC 59th (Staffordshire) Infantry Division in September 1939 and GOC Midland Area in May 1940 before returning to retirement with his wife in January 1942.

== Bibliography ==
- Smart, Nick (2005). Biographical Dictionary of British Generals of the Second World War. Barnsley, South Yorkshire: Pen and Sword Books. ISBN 1844150496.

Military offices
New command	GOC 59th (Staffordshire) Infantry Division; September–December 1939	Succeeded by Ralph Eastwood
