= Frederick Witts =

British Army officer

Lieutenant-General Frederick Witts CB CBE DSO MC
- Born: 30 January 1889; Upper Slaughter, Gloucestershire, England
- Died: 10 March 1969 (aged 80); Memorial Hospital, Cirencester, Gloucestershire, England
- Relatives: Frank Witts (brother)
- Military career
- Allegiance: United Kingdom
- Branch: British Army
- Service years: 1907–1943
- Rank: Lieutenant-General
- Service number: 24225
- Unit: Royal Engineers
- Commands: 8th Indian Infantry Brigade; 45th Infantry Division; 59th (Staffordshire) Infantry Division; Bombay District
- Conflicts: First World War; Second World War
- Awards: Companion of the Order of the Bath; Commander of the Order of the British Empire; Distinguished Service Order; Military Cross; Mentioned in dispatches (3)

Lieutenant-General Frederick Vavasour Broome Witts, CB, CBE, DSO, MC (30 January 1889 – 10 March 1969) was a senior British Army officer.

== Military career ==
The son of the Rev. Francis Edward Broome Witts, he was educated at Radley College. He was commissioned into the Royal Engineers after graduating from the Royal Military Academy, Woolwich, on 23 July 1907. He served in the First World War and was awarded the Military Cross, as well as the Distinguished Service Order (DSO), and was mentioned in dispatches three times during the war. The citation for his MC reads:

For conspicuous gallantry and coolness. Under heavy rifle and machine gun fire he made a personal reconnaissance of the river bank, and subsequently led a party of his men carrying a pontoon across the open and down the bank. Although wounded himself, and in spite of casualties among his party, which made the task increasingly difficult, he succeeded, in full view of the enemy, in launching the pontoon.

Witts attended the Staff College, Quetta, from 1922−1923 and served at the War Office in London for the next four years. After serving on the directing staff at the Staff College, Camberley, from 1930−1932, Witts became commander, Royal Engineers, for the 5th Infantry Division in 1933. On 17 December 1937 he was made brigadier, general staff (BGS), of Western Command in India and was granted the temporary rank of brigadier whilst employed in this role. He was commander of the 8th Indian Brigade in India in May 1938. He was promoted to major general on 28 August 1939, with seniority backdated to 19 July 1938.

In the Second World War he served as General Officer Commanding 45th Infantry Division from September 1939, Deputy Chief of Staff for the British Expeditionary Force (BEF) in France from April 1940 and General Officer Commanding 59th (Staffordshire) Infantry Division from May 1940 until February 1941. After that he became General Officer Commanding Bombay District in India from July 1941. He was briefly appointed Acting Lieutenant-General as Acting General Officer Commanding Southern Command in India during May and June 1942 before retiring in 1943.

== Bibliography ==
- Smart, Nick (2005). Biographical Dictionary of British Generals of the Second World War. Barnsley, South Yorkshire: Pen and Sword Books. ISBN 1844150496.
- Witts, Frederick (2009). Hadman, Jasper (ed.). The Mespot Letters of a Cotswold Soldier. Stroud, Gloucestershire: Amberley Publishing. ISBN 978-1-848-68041-8.

Military offices
| New title | GOC 45th Infantry Division; 1939−1940 | Succeeded by Desmond Anderson |
| Preceded by Ralph Eastwood | GOC 59th (Staffordshire) Infantry Division; 1940–1941 | Succeeded by James Steele |
