= Ralph Eastwood =

British Army general (1890–1959)

Lieutenant-General Sir Ralph Eastwood KCB DSO MC
- Eastwood in 1938
- Born: 10 May 1890; Canterbury, Kent, England
- Died: 15 February 1959 (aged 68); Rodmarton, Gloucestershire, England
- Military career
- Allegiance: United Kingdom; New Zealand
- Branch: British Army (1910–1914, 1918–1947); New Zealand Expeditionary Force (1914–1918)
- Service years: 1910–1947
- Rank: Lieutenant-General
- Service number: 19399
- Unit: Rifle Brigade (The Prince Consort's Own)
- Commands: Gibraltar (1944–1947); Northern Command (1941–1944); Home Guard (1940–1941); 4th Infantry Division (1940); 18th Infantry Division (1940); 59th Infantry Division (1939–1940); Royal Military College, Sandhurst (1938–1939); 2nd Battalion, King's Royal Rifle Corps (1934–1936); 12th (Service) Battalion, Rifle Brigade (The Prince Consort's Own) (1918–1919)
- Conflicts: First World War; North Russia Intervention; Second World War
- Awards: Knight Commander of the Order of the Bath; Distinguished Service Order; Military Cross; Mentioned in Despatches (6); Grand Cross of the Order of Adolphe of Nassau (Luxembourg)

Lieutenant-General Sir Thomas Ralph Eastwood, KCB, DSO, MC (10 May 1890 – 15 February 1959) was a senior British Army officer who notably served as Governor of Gibraltar towards the end of the Second World War.

== Early life ==
Thomas Ralph Eastwood was born on 10 May 1890 at Canterbury in the county of Kent in England. He was the second son of Captain (later Colonel) Hugh de Crespigny Eastwood of the King's Dragoon Guards who went on to distinguish himself in the Second Boer War, earned the Distinguished Service Order in 1902 and finished his military career as Inspector of Cyclist Units in 1918. Ralph's mother was Elinor, who married Hugh in 1887 and was the daughter of General John Hall Smyth. Elinor's sister was Ethel Smyth, the composer and militant suffragette. Ralph's older brother Hugh became a lieutenant commander in the Royal Navy. Eastwood was educated at Eton College from 1904 to 1908.

== Military career ==
After leaving Eton, Eastwood was accepted into the Royal Military College, Sandhurst. He was commissioned as a second lieutenant into the Rifle Brigade (The Prince Consort's Own) in October 1910.

He was promoted to lieutenant in November 1911 and, a year later, in November 1912, he was appointed aide-de-camp to the governor of New Zealand, Lord Liverpool. He was released from this role on the outbreak of the First World War in the summer of 1914, when he was commissioned into the New Zealand Expeditionary Force, later serving as a captain in the New Zealand Rifle Brigade (Earl of Liverpool's Own). After participating in the occupation of German Samoa, Eastwood left New Zealand with the Third Reinforcement in February 1915, arriving at Suez by sea forty days later.

In April 1915, his battalion was deployed to Gallipoli, where he served as a staff captain and was later awarded the Military Cross (MC) for his leadership of a column during a night assault on 6–7 August 1915. The medal's citation reads:

For conspicuous gallantry and ability during operations on 6th–7th August, 1915, in the Gallipoli Peninsula. He guided the night advance of his brigade with skill and resource, especially when the head of the column came under the enemy's fire. Owing to the severity of the opposition the advance came gradually to a standstill, and at this point Captain Eastwood rendered very valuable service in reorganising the1 column, thus enabling it to continue the advance.

After service with the Egyptian Expeditionary Force (EEF), Eastwood's brigade was transferred to France, where in October 1917 he became a general staff officer, grade 2 and was later promoted to the rank of major. and brevet major in January 1918.

Eastwood transferred back to the British Army on 17 October 1918, and in 1919 he served in the ill-fated North Russia Intervention, as brigade major on General Lord Rawlinson's staff. After further staff duties at Aldershot, Cork in Ireland, and after having attended the Staff College, Camberley, from 1921 to 1922, he served on the staff at the War Office in London, before becoming an instructor at the Staff College, in 1928. Following a spell as commanding officer (CO) of the 2nd Battalion, King's Royal Rifle Corps, he was on 12 January 1938 appointed commandant of the Royal Military College, Sandhurst, taking over this role from Major General Bertie Fisher. He was promoted to major general on the same date.

== Second World War ==
In December 1939, following the outbreak of the Second World War, Eastwood was appointed General Officer Commanding of the 59th (Staffordshire) Infantry Division, a command he held until 31 May 1940. He was briefly given command of the 18th Infantry Division, before taking on the role of Chief of Staff in the short-lived Second British Expeditionary Force. Following his return to the United Kingdom, he was given command of the 4th Infantry Division. In October 1940, he was appointed to the new post of Inspector-General of the Home Guard, becoming Director-General of the Home Guard with the rank of lieutenant-general in November. In June 1941, Eastwood was appointed General Officer Commanding-in-Chief of Northern Command. He went on to be Governor of Gibraltar in 1944 and retired from the British Army in 1947. In 1945 he accepted the largely honorary post of Colonel Commandant of the 1st Battalion, Rifle Brigade.

== Family life ==
Ralph Eastwood married Mabel Vivian Prideaux on 21 April 1921; they had one son, Thomas Hugh Eastwood (12 March 1922 – 25 October 1999), who was a composer. Ralph died at the age of 68 on 15 February 1959 at Rodmarton in Gloucestershire.

== Bibliography ==
- Smart, Nick (2005). Biographical Dictionary of British Generals of the Second World War. Barnsley, South Yorkshire: Pen and Sword Books. ISBN 1844150496.

Military offices
Preceded by Bertie Fisher	Commandant of the Royal Military College, Sandhurst; 1938–1939	Sandhurst in alternative use during the war
Preceded by John Blakistan-Houston	GOC 59th (Staffordshire) Infantry Division; 1939–1940	Succeeded by Frederick Witts
Preceded by Bernard Paget	GOC 18th Infantry Division; June 1940	Succeeded by Lionel Finch
Preceded by Dudley Johnson	GOC 4th Infantry Division; June–October 1940	Succeeded by John Swayne
Preceded by Sir Ronald Forbes Adam	GOC-in-C Northern Command; 1941–1944	Succeeded by Sir Edwin Morris
Government offices
Preceded by Sir Noel Mason-MacFarlane	Governor of Gibraltar; 1944–1947	Succeeded by Sir Kenneth Anderson
