= William Bradshaw (British Army officer) =

British Army general (1897–1966)

Major-General William Bradshaw CB DSO
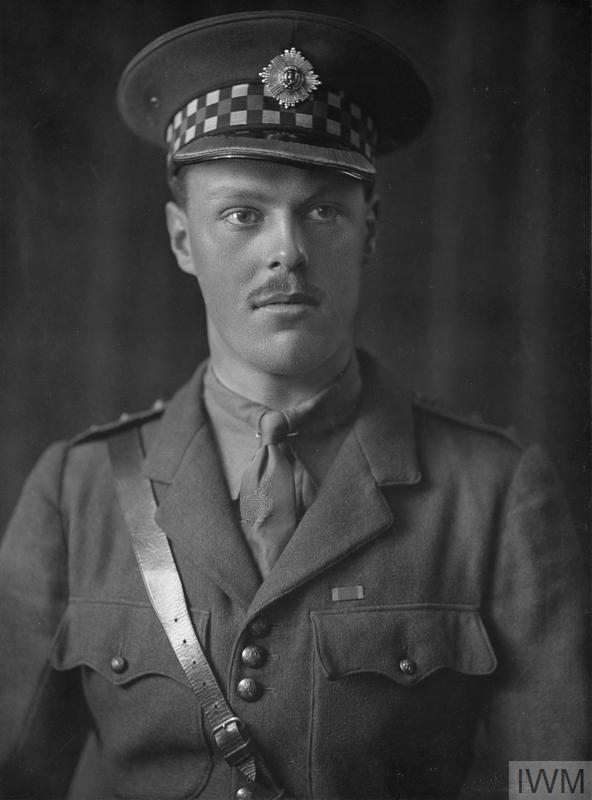
- Bradshaw, pictured here as a captain in the First World War
- Born: 8 March 1897
- Died: 9 April 1966 (aged 69)
- Military career
- Allegiance: United Kingdom
- Branch: British Army
- Service years: 1914–1946
- Rank: Major-General
- Nickname: "Pat"
- Service number: 22511
- Unit: Scots Guards
- Commands: 2nd Battalion, Scots Guards; 4th (London) Infantry Brigade; 24th Independent Infantry Brigade (Guards); 59th (Staffordshire) Infantry Division; 48th Infantry (Reserve) Division
- Conflicts: First World War; Second World War
- Awards: Companion of the Order of the Bath; Distinguished Service Order

Major-General William Pat Arthur Bradshaw, CB, DSO (8 March 1897 − 9 April 1966) was a British Army officer.

== Biography ==
Educated at Eton College and Royal Military College, Sandhurst, Bradshaw was commissioned into the Scots Guards in 1914. He was deployed to France and was mentioned in dispatches and appointed a Companion of the Distinguished Service Order in 1917.

After serving as ADC to the Viceroy of India, Bradshaw became commanding officer of the 2nd Battalion, Scots Guards in 1935 and commander of the Scots Guards Regiment and Regimental District in 1938.

He became commander of 4th (London) Infantry Brigade, which was later renamed the 140th (London) Infantry Brigade, in August 1939. He went on to be commander of commander of 24th Independent Brigade in November 1941, General Officer Commanding 59th (Staffordshire) Infantry Division in April 1942 and General Officer Commanding 48th (South Midland) Division in March 1944 before retiring in May 1946.

== Family ==
In 1938 he married a daughter of Lord Cadman.

== Bibliography ==
- Smart, Nick (2005). Biographical Dictionary of British Generals of the Second World War. Barnesley: Pen & Sword. ISBN 1844150496.

Military offices
Preceded by James Steele	GOC 59th (Staffordshire) Infantry Division; 1942–1944	Succeeded by Lewis Lyne
Preceded by Horatio Berney-Ficklin	GOC 48th Infantry (Reserve) Division; 1944–1946	Division disbanded
