= 59th (Staffordshire) Divisional Engineers =

59th (Staffordshire) Divisional Engineers 59th GHQ Troops, Royal Engineers
- Active: September 1939 – present
- Country: United Kingdom
- Branch: Territorial Army
- Type: Field Engineer
- Role: Divisional Engineers; GHQ Troops
- Part of: 59th (Staffordshire) Infantry Division; 21st Army Group
- Garrison/HQ: Aigburth, Liverpool
- Engagements: Battle for Caen; Mont Pincon; Battle of the Scheldt; Operation Plunder; Elbe Crossing

59th (Staffordshire) Divisional Engineers was the Royal Engineer (RE) component of 59th (Staffordshire) Infantry Division, a formation of the British Army during the Second World War. The division saw action in the Normandy Campaign, and after it was broken up in August 1944 the Divisional Engineers were attached directly to the General Headquarters of 21st Army Group and continued in action until the end of the War in Europe as 59th GHQ Troops, Royal Engineers (59 GHQTRE).

The lineage of this unit is preserved in the form of 107 (Lancashire and Cheshire) Field Sqn at Birkenhead.

== Origin ==
Following the Munich Crisis of 1938, the British War Office decided to double the size of the part-time Territorial Army. The existing 55th (West Lancashire) Infantry Division began forming a new 2nd Line duplicate, designated the 59th (Staffordshire) Infantry Division (although about a third of the units came from Lancashire rather than Staffordshire). This process was still under way on the outbreak of the Second World War in September 1939. (A previous 59th (2nd North Midland) Division had existed during the First World War as the 2nd Line of the 46th (North Midland) Division, but both had been subsequently disbanded.)

The new division became operational on 15 September 1939, but the Divisional Engineers, based in Aigburth, Liverpool, were assembled more slowly under the control of 55th Division and only joined later:

- 509th Field Company, RE, joined on 11 January 1940
- 510th Field Company, RE, joined on 10 March 1940
- 511th Field Park Company, RE, joined on 30 December 1939
- 257th Field Company, RE, based in Manchester, joined from 66th Divisional Engineers (the 2nd Line of 42nd (East Lancashire) Divisional Engineers) on 23 June 1940 after the disbandment of the 66th Division
- 24th Bridging Platoon, Royal Engineers, subsequently joined 1 October 1943

The division served in various parts of the United Kingdom for the first part of the war, including a spell in Northern Ireland (June 1942 to March 1943). Latterly it was training for Operation Overlord. It embarked on 21 June 1944 and landed in Normandy on 27 June (D + 21).

== Normandy ==
On 8 July, 59th Division took part in a large-scale assault on Caen. The attack on the division's front was only partially successful, but after clearing up pockets of resistance it reached its objectives the next day. 59th division was then moved west of Caen and attacked again, on 15–18 July, as part of the holding operation before Operation Goodwood was launched to the east. On 6 August the division's infantry forded the River Orne and then held off heavy counter-attacks until bridges could be built by the engineers. By 18 August, the division was pushing south towards Mont Pincon as part of the northern pincer closing the Falaise Pocket.

== GHQ Troops ==
The War Office realised even before D-Day that the army's manpower situation was so bad that some formations in 21st Army Group would have to be disbanded sooner or later. At the end of August 1944 the 59th Division, as the junior infantry division in the theatre, was selected to be broken up to provide reinforcements for other formations. Although 24th Bridging Pln was probably disbanded, the rest of the divisional engineers were kept together as 59th GHQ Troops, Royal Engineers (59 GHQTRE), serving directly under General Headquarters of 21st Army Group and allocated to subordinate HQs for operations as required.

== Walcheren ==
As part of the operation to clear the River Scheldt and port of Antwerp, 59th GHQTRE under the command of Lt-Col E.W.L Whitehorn assisted the Commandos of 4th Special Service Brigade in their amphibious assault on Walcheren on 1 November 1944. One platoon or section of sappers was allocated to give general assistance to each of the five Commando units, and a detachment of the field park company landed with six bulldozers, leaving the rest of the field companies for beach maintenance. The RE History is critical of the plan: 'As is usual in such circumstances the detachments with the assaulting troops were required to do little engineer work and were employed largely as infantry, in one case a R.E. lance-corporal capturing a pill-box with its seven occupants single-handed. Meanwhile, the R.E. in the maintenance area could not keep pace with the work there'.

The Commandos had sailed from Ostend and landed successfully before dawn at Flushing, but the bulldozers of 59th GHQTRE ran into soft mud and only one could be extricated, and most of the engineering stores were lost, though casualties among the sappers were light. The field companies had considerable trouble with preparing the landing area and clearing the abundant mines, which were covered so deeply with sand that mine-detectors could not locate them, and they had to be found by laborious prodding – and the process repeated every time tracked vehicles wore away the surface, or shelling disturbed the sand.

== Crossing the Rhine ==
During the crossing of the Rhine on 23–24 March 1945 (Operation Plunder), 59th GHQTRE was allocated to XXX Corps, with its commander, Lt-Col R.E. Lloyd, acting as Commanding Royal Engineer for the right-hand assault towards Rees by 153 Brigade of 51st (Highland) Division. Preliminary engineer work included improving the approaches to the crossing points, cutting gaps through flood banks, and moving forward stores. During the assault, the role of 59th GHQTRE (with 69th Field Company of 6th Army TRE attached) was to build and man the close support rafts operating a ferry service codenamed 'Poplar'. The rafts were assembled on the river bank during darkness while the assaulting infantry crossed, and several rafts were in the water by dawn, when they were still shielded by mist. One raft took a bulldozer across to improve the exits on the far bank.

As the RE History relates: 'Suddenly the mist cleared and the R.E. found themselves in full view of the defenders of Rees, the nearest of which was barely 500 yards away. The transport was got away, but, in spite of fire which damaged rafts and made casualties of the OC and several senior NCOs of 257th Company, which was working on the site nearest Rees, the units carried on and were ready to receive "trade" by 11.30 a.m.' Shortly afterwards, Lt-Col Lloyd was wounded and evacuated, and observed enemy shellfire on the ferry sites became so intense that no troops could be brought forward to cross. Colonel F.C. Nottingham of 13th Army Group RE, commanding all engineers on the divisional front, ordered the uncommitted 69th Field Company to move downstream and attempt to establish another ferry site near Honnopel. This it did during the night of 24–25 March, and the ferry started to operate at 06.30 on 25 March.

Meanwhile, the other three companies of 59th GHQTRE, despite casualties in men and equipment, 'managed to ferry over some vehicles of vital tactical importance to the right brigade'. At dusk on 24 March it made another effort to start a regular ferry service, but this brought down heavy enemy fire, with one raft being destroyed and its whole RE detachment killed. At 22.30, Col Nottingham ordered the three companies to float their rafts downstream to a site where DD tanks and infantry stormboats of the left brigade had already crossed, but this was stopped by heavy artillery and small-arms fire from the German-held bank. Finally, manned and unmanned rafts were floated downstream at 02.00 on 25 March and four were in position by 04.00, beginning a ferry operation by 05.00. Shelling recommenced, but despite heavy casualties the sappers continued ferrying for four hours. Full daylight made this too dangerous, and the 59th GHQTRE companies moved their rafts further downstream to where 69th Field Company was working without serious interference. The sappers continued operating their raft ferries until the morning of 26 March, and intermittently thereafter. On that day 59th GHQTRE took over operating the 'Gravesend' tank ferry near Rees, which had been established by 5th Assault Regiment RE of 79th Armoured Division. This continued until a Class 40 Bailey bridge was completed the next day.

== Crossing the Elbe ==
The last major assault engineering operation of the war in Europe was the crossing of the River Elbe by 15th (Scottish) Division on 29 April 1945. On this occasion, 257th Field Company from 59th GHQTRE was attached to 6th Army TRE to operate two stormboat ferries, a Class 9 and Class 40 ferry, and to prepare the necessary approaches. Despite some shelling and persistent low-level attacks by Luftwaffe aircraft, the tasks were carried out successfully, and 21st Army Group drove on until the German surrender at Lüneburg Heath on 4 May 1945.

59 GHQTRE and its subunits were disbanded after the end of the Second World War.

== Postwar ==
When the TA was reconstituted in 1947, 257 and 509 Field Companies were reformed (as field squadrons) in 128 Field Engineer Regiment, while 510 and 511 Field Companies were reformed (as construction squadrons) in 130 Construction Regiment. Both these regiments were based in Liverpool as the descendants of 55th (West Lancashire) Divisional Engineers. Both regiments, together with 257 and 511 Squadrons, were disbanded in 1949, but 509 and 510 Sqns were transferred (as a field park squadron and a field squadron respectively) to 107 Field Engineer Regiment, formed in St Helens in 1947 and also considered a lineal representative of 55th Divisional Engineers. In 1961 it was redesignated 107 Corps Engineer Regiment and 510 Sqn was disbanded, leaving only 509 Sqn of the former 59th Divisional RE. When the TA was converted into the TAVR in 1967, the whole regiment was reduced to a single squadron as 107 Field Sqn (Volunteers).

This unit still exists in the form of 107 (Lancashire and Cheshire) Field Sqn at Birkenhead as part of 75 Engineer Regiment (Volunteers) in the Army Reserve. By 2020 this squadron will have re-roled as a 'logistical bridging and wide wet gap crossing' unit.

== See also ==
During the First World War, a 257th Tunnelling Company what been formed in 1916, and in 1917 the numbers 509, 510 and 511 had been assigned to the following Territorial Force (TF) Field Companies:

- 509th (London), formerly 1/1st London Field Company, attached to 6th Division
- 510th (London), formerly 1/2nd London Field Company, attached to 29th Division
- 511th (London), formerly 1/5th London Field Company, attached to 58th (2/1st London) Division

These units were renumbered when the TF reformed in 1920.

== External sources ==
- British Army units from 1945 on
- British Army Website
- British Military History
- Orders of Battle at Patriot Files
- Lt-Col Edward de Santis, Ubique.
