= Kirkup =

Kirkup is a surname. Notable people with the surname include:

- Alan Kirkup (born 1956), English soccer player and coach in the United States
- Dan Kirkup (born 1988), English footballer
- Eddie Kirkup (1929–2008), English athlete
- James Kirkup (1918–2009), English poet
- Joe Kirkup (born 1939), English footballer
- Martin Kirkup (1948–2024), British-American music industry executive
- Seymour Kirkup (1788–1880), English painter
- Toby Kirkup (1972–2020), English actor, writer and television presenter, known for his role as a police sergeant on Peaky Blinders
- Zak Kirkup (born 1987), Australian politician
