= 132nd Infantry Brigade (United Kingdom) =

Middlesex Brigade 132nd (Middlesex) Brigade 132nd Infantry Brigade
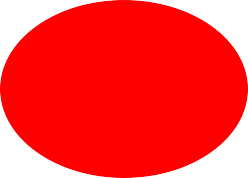
- 132nd Infantry Brigade
- Active: 1908–1943, ca 1947–ca 1968
- Country: United Kingdom
- Branch: Territorial Army
- Type: Infantry
- Size: Brigade
- Engagements: Dunkirk evacuation Western Desert Campaign

Commanders
- Notable commanders: James Steele; Lashmer Whistler

The 132nd Infantry Brigade was an infantry brigade of the British Army that remained in British India during the First World War. During the Second World War, it served with the 44th (Home Counties) Infantry Division in Belgium and France, later being evacuated at Dunkirk and seeing service again in North Africa at El Alamein before being disbanded in January 1943.

== Formation ==
After the creation of the Territorial Force in 1908, the 7th, 8th, 9th and 10th Volunteer battalions of the Middlesex Regiment were organised into a brigade within the Home Counties Division. The brigade was designated the Middlesex Brigade.

== First World War ==
On the outbreak of the First World War, the men of the division accepted liability for overseas service to relieve Regular troops for the fighting fronts. The 7th and 8th Middlesex sailed for Gibraltar on 4 and 10 September 1914. The rest of the division was ordered to India, although the brigade staffs and Regular adjutants of the battalions were to remain behind. To replace 7th and 8th Middlesex, the 4th Battalion, Border Regiment and 4th Battalion, King's Shropshire Light Infantry were added to the Middlesex Brigade, and the 1st Brecknockshire Battalion of the South Wales Borderers also sailed with the brigade. The Home Counties Division embarked at Southampton and sailed on 30 October 1914, disembarking at Bombay on 1–3 December.

=== Service in India ===
On arrival, the division's units were sent distributed to various peacetime stations across India, Aden and Burma to continue their training for war. The Border and KSLI battalions joined the Burma Division, the Brecon battalion went to Aden, and for a while the two Middlesex battalions were attached to the Presidency Brigade in 8th (Lucknow) Division. The TF battalions had all taken the prefix '1' (1/4th Queen's etc) to distinguish them from their 2nd Line battalions forming in the United Kingdom. In March 1915, 2/4th Border Regiment was sent out to the brigade to replace 4th KSLI, which had moved from Burma to Singapore. In May 1915, the division was numbered 44th (Home Counties) Division and the brigade formally became 132nd (1/1st Middlesex) Brigade (though without a commander or staff, and with its battalions scattered). (Note: 132nd Brigade was originally authorised as part of 44th Division in March 1915 and consisted of 'Kitchener's Army' battalions. They were renumbered 111th Brigade and 37th Division on 12 April 1915 and the original numbers were later reassigned to the Middlesex Brigade and Home Counties Division.)

From 1915 onwards there was a regular drain on the battalions as they lost their best Non-Commissioned Officers for officer training, sent detachments to various places in India, and provided drafts to replace casualties among units fighting in Mesopotamia. By early 1916 it had become obvious that the Territorial Divisions in India were never going to be able to reform and return to Europe to reinforce the Western Front as had been originally intended. They continued training in India for the rest of the war, providing drafts and detachments as required. 1/9th Middlesex was transferred to Mesopotamia at the end of 1917, landing at Basra on 11 December and transferring to 53rd Indian Brigade, 18th Indian Division.

By 1918 the only units still formally attached to 132nd Brigade were 1/10th Middlesex and 1/4th Border (now returned from Burma and actually serving in the Jubbulpore Brigade of 5th (Mhow) Division). During 1919 the remaining Territorial units in India were gradually reduced, but 1/4th and 2/4th Border finally saw active service during the Third Afghan War.

=== Order of Battle ===
During the First World War the Middlesex Brigade was composed as follows:

Commander: Brigadier-General W.R. Clifford (remained in England)

- 7th Battalion, Middlesex Regiment (from Hornsey) – to Gibraltar
- 8th Battalion, Middlesex Regiment (from Hounslow) – to Gibraltar
- 9th Battalion, Middlesex Regiment (from Willesden) – to India
- 10th Battalion, Middlesex Regiment (from Ravenscourt Park) – to India
- 4th (Cumberland and Westmorland) Battalion, Border Regiment (from Carlisle) – to Burma
- 4th Battalion, King's (Shropshire Light Infantry) (from Shrewsbury) – to Burma
- 1st Brecknockshire Battalion, South Wales Borderers (from Brecon) – to Aden

== Between the wars ==
The Territorial Force was disbanded shortly after the end of the war. It was, however, reformed in the 1920s as the Territorial Army and the 132nd Brigade was reformed as the 132nd (Middlesex) Infantry Brigade in 1920. The division was also reconstituted as the 44th (Home Counties) Infantry Division. The brigade was reformed with the same composition as it had before the First World War. However, in 1920, the 10th Battalion, Middlesex Regiment was converted into the Home Counties Divisional Signals, Royal Corps of Signals. They were replaced in the brigade by the 5th Battalion, Queen's Own Royal West Kent Regiment from the 133rd (Kent and Sussex) Infantry Brigade.

In the late 1930s, however, all three of the Middlesex battalions were posted away or converted to other roles. The 9th Battalion was, in 1938, converted into the 9th Battalion, Middlesex Regiment (60th Searchlight Regiment) and transferred to the 40th Anti-Aircraft Group, 2nd Anti-Aircraft Division. In the same year, the Middlesex Regiment was designated as a Machine Gun regiment and the 7th and 8th Middlesex were transferred elsewhere. Also in 1938, all infantry brigades in the British Army were reduced from four battalions to three. The 7th and 8th Middlesex were replaced by the 4th Royal West Kents from the 133rd Brigade and the 6th Battalion, East Surrey Regiment from the 131st (Surrey) Infantry Brigade. In 1939 the brigade was redesignated 132nd Infantry Brigade.

== Second World War ==
The brigade and division, alongside most of the rest of the Territorial Army, was mobilised in late August 1939 due to the situation in Europe deteriorating situation in Europe. 3 September 1939 saw the start of the Second World War after the German Army invaded Poland two days before, on 1 September 1939.

Shortly after full mobilisation in early September 1939, 132nd Brigade HQ became HQ Central Sub-Area in the United Kingdom and the units of the brigade were temporarily under the command of other formations until the brigade reassembled in 44th (Home Counties) Infantry Division on 7 October 1939.

=== Order of Battle ===
132 Brigade was constituted as follows:

- 1/6th Battalion, East Surrey Regiment (until 4 May 1940, to 10th Brigade)
- 4th Battalion, Queen's Own Royal West Kent Regiment
- 5th Battalion, Queen's Own Royal West Kent Regiment
- 132nd Infantry Brigade Anti-Tank Company (formed 1 December 1939, disbanded 15 January 1941)
- 1st Battalion, Queen's Own Royal West Kent Regiment (from 10th Brigade, from 4 May until 29 June 1940)
- 1/7th Battalion, Queen's Royal Regiment (West Surrey) (from 25th Brigade on 1 July 1940, returned to 131st Brigade 1 July 1941)
- 2nd Battalion, Buffs (Royal East Kent Regiment) (from 131st Brigade 2 July 1941)

=== Commanders ===
The following officers commanded 132nd Brigade during the war:

- Brigadier T.T. Waddington (until 8 November 1939)
- Brigadier J.S. Steele (from 8 November 1939 until 14 February 1941)
- Brigadier C.B. Robertson (from 14 February 1941 until 4 September 1942)
- Brigadier L.G. Whistler (from acting command of 133rd Brigade 4 September until 26 November 1942)
- Lieutenant Colonel W.H. Lambert (Acting, from 26 November 1942)

=== Service ===
On 2 April 1940, the 132nd Brigade, now commanded by Brigadier James Steele, MC, (later to become Adjutant-General to the Forces), an officer of the Regular Army, went to France with 44th Division as part of the British Expeditionary Force (BEF). The division came under command of III Corps, including 5th Division and 42nd (East Lancashire) Division, another Territorial division. Both 44th and 42nd divisions had been held back from reinforcing the BEF sooner in order to participate in potential operations in Northern Europe, yet this had never come to anything. Shortly after their arrival, the 1/6th Battalion, East Surrey Regiment was transferred to the 10th Brigade, part of 4th Division, receiving the 1st Battalion, Queen's Own Royal West Kent Regiment, a Regular Army unit, in exchange and the "Kent and Surrey" brigade became an all-West Kent formation. The reason for the exchange of units was due to official BEF policy of mixing the Regular and Territorial Armies, and, in theory, to strengthen the inexperienced Territorial divisions.

The brigade saw fighting in the St Omer–La Bassée area during retreat to Dunkirk, part of the Battle of France – when the brigade commander, James Steele, was awarded a DSO – and was then evacuated from Dunkirk on 31 May 1940.

Back in the United Kingdom, 132nd Brigade was re-equipped and positioned in its own county of Kent to defend what 44th Division's commander, Major-General Sir Brian Horrocks, regarded as 'the No 1 German invasion area, stretching from the Isle of Thanet to Dover and on to Folkestone'.

The brigade was shipped out to North Africa in May 1942 with the rest of 44th Division, where it fought at the Battle of Alam el Halfa and the Second Battle of El Alamein. The 44th Division was broken up after Alamein, due to a shortage of manpower in the Mediterranean, and the brigade's battalions were posted away during November and December. 132nd Brigade was officially disbanded in Egypt on 15 January 1943. The battalions were posted away to British Indian Army brigades, the 2nd Buffs joined the 26th Indian Infantry Brigade, the 4th Royal West Kents sent to the 161st Indian Infantry Brigade and the 5th Royal West Kents to the 21st Indian Infantry Brigade. The former two would both later fight in the Burma Campaign, the 4th Royal West Kents with distinction, winning a VC (belonging to Lance Corporal John Harman) in the Battle of Kohima, whilst the latter, the 5th Royal West Kents, would see service throughout the Italian Campaign.

== Post war ==
The brigade was reorganised postwar but disbanded by 1968.

== Bibliography ==
- Maj A.F. Becke, History of the Great War: Order of Battle of Divisions, Part 2a: The Territorial Force Mounted Divisions and the 1st-Line Territorial Force Divisions (42–56), London: HM Stationery Office, 1935/Uckfield: Naval & Military Press, 2007, ISBN 1-84734-739-8.
- Maj A.F. Becke, History of the Great War: Order of Battle of Divisions, Part 3b: New Army Divisions (30–41) and 63rd (R.N.) Division, London: HM Stationery Office, 1939/Uckfield: Naval & Military Press, 2007, ISBN 1-84734-741-X.
- David Fraser. And We Shall Shock Them: The British Army in the Second World War. Cassell Military. (1999) [1983] ISBN 978-0-304-35233-3.
- Lt-Gen Sir Brian Horrocks, A Full Life, London: Collins, 1960.
- Lt-Col H.F. Joslen, Orders of Battle, United Kingdom and Colonial Formations and Units in the Second World War, 1939–1945, London: HM Stationery Office, 1960/London: London Stamp Exchange, 1990, ISBN 0-948130-03-2/Uckfield: Naval & Military Press, 2003, ISBN 1-84342-474-6.
- Brian Robson, Crisis on the Frontier: The Third Afghan War and the Campaign in Waziristan 1919–20, Staplehurst: Spellmount, 2004, ISBN 1-862272-11-5.
