= 177th (2/1st Lincoln and Leicester) Brigade =

2/1st Lincoln and Leicester Brigade 177th (2/1st Lincoln and Leicester) Brigade 177th Infantry Brigade
- Active: 1914-1919; 1939-1944
- Country: United Kingdom
- Branch: Territorial Army
- Type: Infantry
- Size: Brigade
- Part of: 59th (2nd North Midland) Division; 59th (Staffordshire) Infantry Division
- Engagements: First World War; Second World War

The 177th (2/1st Lincoln and Leicester) Brigade was an infantry brigade of the British Army that saw active service in the First World War as part of 59th (2nd North Midland) Division and fought again in the Second World War, now the 177th Infantry Brigade, with the 59th (Staffordshire) Infantry Division before being disbanded in August 1944.

== First World War ==
The brigade was raised during the First World War. Part of the Territorial Force, the brigade was raised as a duplicate of the 138th (Lincoln and Leicester) Brigade and was raised from those men in the Territorial Force who had not originally agreed to serve overseas. It was assigned to the 59th (2nd North Midland) Division. However, with the division, the brigade was sent overseas in early 1917 and saw service in the trenches of the Western Front in France and Belgium, in particular during the Third Battle of Ypres, the Battle of Cambrai and Operation Michael, part of the German spring offensive.

=== Order of Battle ===
- 2/4th Battalion, Lincolnshire Regiment
- 2/5th Battalion, Lincolnshire Regiment, disbanded 31 July 1918
- 2/4th Battalion, Leicestershire Regiment
- 2/5th Battalion, Leicestershire Regiment
- 177th Machine Gun Company, Machine Gun Corps
- 177th Trench Mortar Battery
- 11th Garrison Guard Battalion, Somerset Light Infantry, became 11th Battalion 16 July 1918
- 15th Garrison Guard Battalion, Essex Regiment, became 15th Battalion 16 July 1918
- 2/6th Garrison Guard Battalion, Durham Light Infantry, became 2/6th Battalion 16 July 1918
- 2nd Provisional Garrison Guard Battalion, became 25th Garrison Battalion, King's Royal Rifle Corps 25 May 1918
- 3rd Provisional Garrison Guard Battalion, became 13th Garrison Battalion, Duke of Wellington's Regiment 25 May 1918

== Second World War ==
The brigade was disbanded after the war in late 1919 as was the rest of the Territorial Force, which was reformed as the Territorial Army in 1920. Due to the increasing likelihood of war breaking out with Germany, the Territorial Army was ordered to be doubled in size and the brigade was reformed, as the 177th Infantry Brigade. The brigade was created as a 2nd Line duplicate of 176th Infantry Brigade and was assigned to the 59th (Staffordshire) Motor Division. After spending many years training in the United Kingdom, the brigade, with rest of the division, was sent overseas to France in late June 1944 as part of Operation Overlord and joined the British Second Army in its attempts to capture Caen. The brigade fought in Operation Charnwood and the Second Battle of the Odon and helped the 59th Division gain an excellent reputation as one of Bernard Montgomery's most reliable divisions.

The majority of the British Army was, by this stage of the war, suffering from a shortage of manpower, particularly in the rifle infantry (where the majority of casualties fell and where the problem was most acute) and, to a lesser extent, in the Royal Armoured Corps. As a consequence of this, and higher than anticipated casualties in Normandy, along with there being very few draftable infantrymen in the United Kingdom by August 1944, the only solution to this was by breaking up field force units in order to bring other units up to strength. Therefore, the 59th Division, as the most junior of all the British infantry divisions fighting in France, was broken up in late August in order to provide replacements for other British divisions of the 21st Army Group. The 177th Brigade ceased to exist by 26 August 1944 and the battalions were broken up and sent to other infantry units.

=== Order of battle ===
177th Brigade was constituted as follows during the war:

- 5th Battalion, South Staffordshire Regiment
- 1/6th Battalion, South Staffordshire Regiment
- 2/6th Battalion, South Staffordshire Regiment
- 177th Infantry Brigade Anti-Tank Company (formed 13 July, disbanded 31 December 1940)

=== Commanders ===
The following officers commanded 177th Brigade during the war:

- Brigadier A.E. Hawkins (until 10 August 1942)
- Brigadier M.S. Ekins (from 10 August 1942 until 28 January 1944)
- Brigadier M. Elrington (from 28 January 1944)
