= South Lancashire Regiment =

Prince of Wales's Volunteers (South Lancashire Regiment) South Lancashire Regiment (The Prince of Wales's Volunteers)
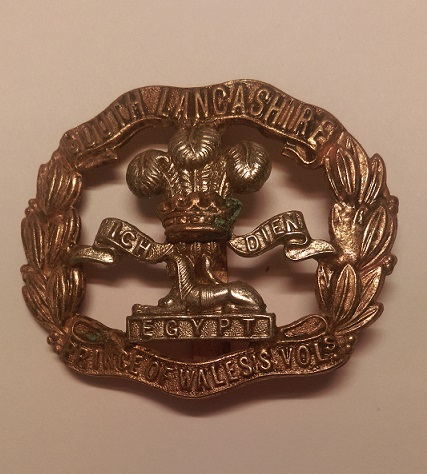
- Cap badge of the South Lancashire Regiment.
- Active: 1881–1958
- Country: United Kingdom
- Branch: British Army
- Type: Infantry
- Role: Line infantry
- Size: 1–2 Regular battalions 1 Militia and Special Reserve battalion 2 Territorial and Volunteer battalions Up to 15 Hostilities-only battalions
- RHQ: Peninsula Barracks, Warrington, South Lancashire
- Nickname: The Excellers
- Motto: Ich dien (I serve)
- Engagements: Second Boer War; World War I World War II

The South Lancashire Regiment was a line infantry regiment of the British Army in existence from 1881 to 1958.

The regiment, which recruited, as its title suggests, primarily from the South Lancashire area, was created as part of the Childers Reforms in 1881 as the Prince of Wales's Volunteers (South Lancashire Regiment) by the amalgamation of the 40th (the 2nd Somersetshire) Regiment of Foot and the 82nd Regiment of Foot (Prince of Wales's Volunteers). In 1938, it was renamed the South Lancashire Regiment (The Prince of Wales's Volunteers) and on 1 July 1958 the regiment was amalgamated with the East Lancashire Regiment to form the Lancashire Regiment (Prince of Wales's Volunteers).

== History ==
=== Formation to the First World War ===
The 1st Battalion was in Ranikhet, India, when the regiment was created as part of the Childers Reforms in 1881 as the Prince of Wales's Volunteers (South Lancashire Regiment) by the amalgamation of the 40th (the 2nd Somersetshire) Regiment of Foot and the 82nd Regiment of Foot (Prince of Wales's Volunteers). It was deployed to Aden in 1884 and returned to the United Kingdom in 1886, where it remained until 1899. The 1st Battalion lost 41 men during the Battle of Spion Kop in February 1900, but then captured Green Hill at the Battle of the Tugela Heights later that month during the Second Boer War.

At the same time as the 40th and 82nd regiments amalgamated to form the South Lancashire Regiment, the 4th Royal Lancashire Militia (The Duke of Lancaster's Own Light Infantry) became the new regiment's 3rd Battalion.

In 1881, the local units of the Volunteer Force were affiliated to the regiment. In 1886, the 9th Lancashire Rifle Volunteer Corps at Warrington and Newton, and the 21st Lancashire Rifle Volunteer Corps at St Helens and Widnes became the 1st and 2nd Volunteer Battalions of the regiment.

The 2nd Battalion spent most of the first 30 years of its existence overseas, while the 3rd Battalion was embodied specifically for service in the Second Boer War. In addition, the 1st and 2nd Volunteer Battalions raised a service company to reinforce the 1st Battalion in the field.

Following the end of the war in South Africa in 1902, the 1st battalion was sent to British India, where they replaced the 2nd battalion in Jubbulpore in Bengal. The 2nd battalion returned home, for the first times since 1884.

In 1908, the Volunteers and Militia were reorganised nationally, with the former becoming the Territorial Force and the latter the Special Reserve; the regiment now had one Reserve battalion and two Territorial battalions.

=== The First World War ===
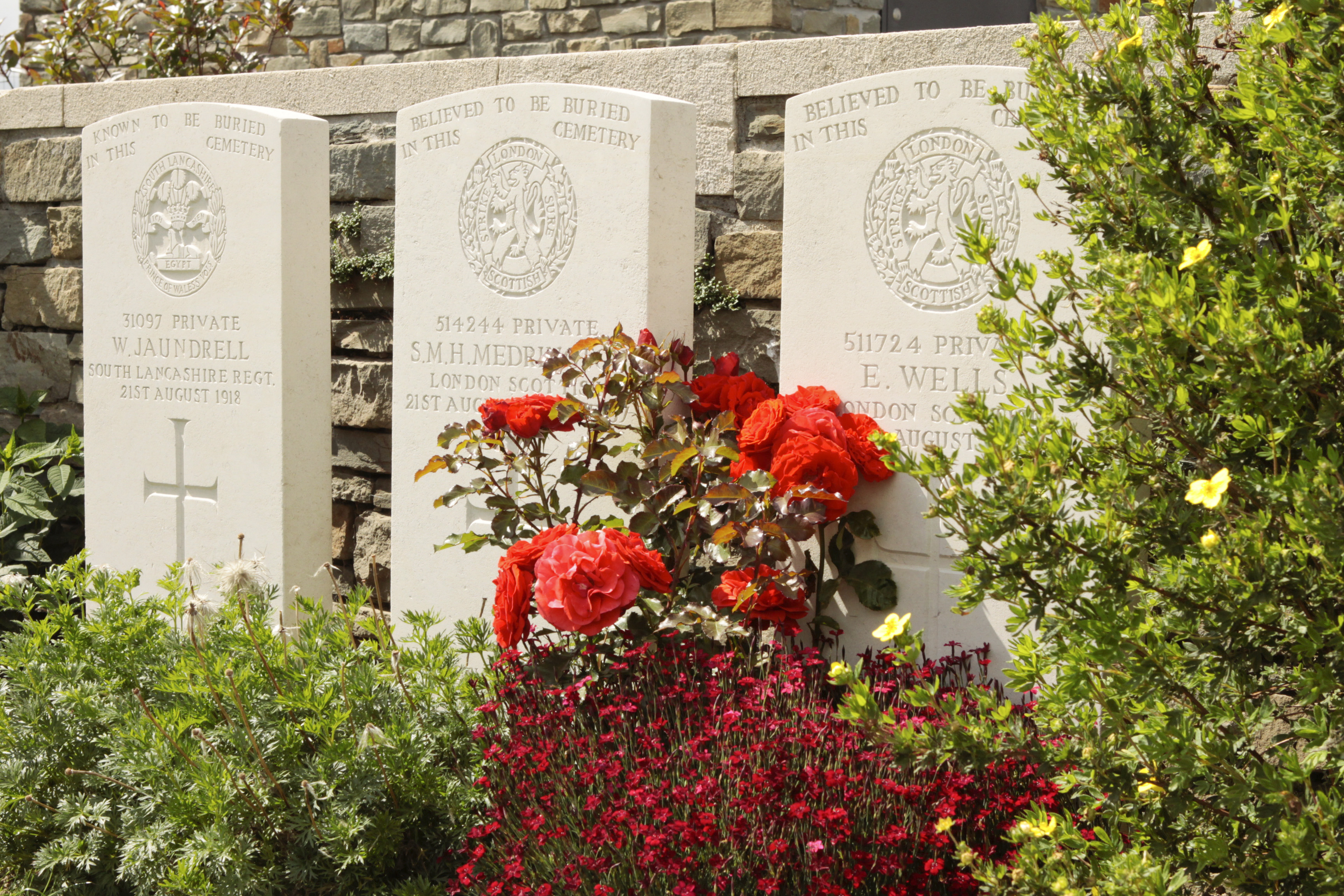
Grave of 31097 Private W. Jaundrell buried at Locre No.10 Cemetery, Loker

==== Regular Army ====
The 1st Battalion spent the war on garrison duty in Quetta, Baluchistan, on the North-West Frontier.

The 2nd Battalion landed at Le Havre as part of the 7th Brigade in the 3rd Division in August 1914 and spent the entire war on the Western Front.

==== Special Reserve ====
The 3rd (Reserve) Battalion spent the whole war in England, initially at Crosby, later at Barrow-in-Furness in the Barrow Garrison, fulfilling its dual role of coast defence and preparing reinforcement drafts of regular reservists, special reservists, recruits and returning wounded for the regular battalions serving overseas. Thousands of men would have passed through its ranks during the war. In September and October 1914, it probably assisted in the formation of 10th (Reserve) Battalion, South Lancashires, at Crosby from Kitchener's Army volunteers.

==== Territorial Force ====
The 1/4th Battalion landed at Le Havre as part of the 7th Brigade in the 3rd Division in February 1915 for service on the Western Front.

The 1/5th Battalion landed at Le Havre as part of the 12th Brigade in the 4th Division in February 1915 also for service on the Western Front.

The 2/4th and 2/5th Battalions landed at Boulogne as part of the 172nd (2/1st South Lancashire) Brigade in the 57th (2nd West Lancashire) Division in February 1917 also for service on the Western Front.

==== New Army Battalions ====
The 6th (Service) Battalion landed at Cape Helles in Gallipoli as part of the 38th Brigade in 13th (Western) Division in July 1915; a detachment from the battalion was commanded by Captain Clement Attlee, who fell ill with dysentery during the campaign but went on to become prime minister. The battalion was evacuated from Gallipoli and went to Egypt in December 1915 before moving on to Mesopotamia in February 1916.

The 7th (Service) Battalion landed at Boulogne as part of the 56th Brigade in the 19th (Western) Division in July 1915 for service on the Western Front.

The 8th (Service) Battalion landed in France as part of the 75th Brigade in the 25th Division in September 1915 also for service on the Western Front.

The 9th (Service) Battalion landed in France as part of the 66th Brigade in the 22nd Division in September 1915 for service on the Western Front but transferred to Salonika in November 1915.

The 11th (Service) Battalion (St Helens Pioneers) landed at Le Havre as pioneer battalion to the 30th Division in November 1915 for service on the Western Front.

=== Between the world wars ===
The 1st Battalion saw action on the North West Frontier in May 1919 and then took part in Third Anglo-Afghan War in July 1919.

After the Armistice with Germany the 3rd (Reserve) Battalion went to Ireland and in 1919 it was stationed in Dublin carrying out duties in support of the civil power during the Partition crisis. It returned to England to be disembodied later in the year.

=== Second World War ===
==== Regular Army ====
The 1st Battalion, a Regular Army battalion, was shipped to France on the outbreak of war in 1939 as part of the 12th Infantry Brigade, 4th Infantry Division, British Expeditionary Force, returning to England via Dunkirk. After returning to the United Kingdom, it was transferred to the 8th Infantry Brigade (which included the 1st Suffolk Regiment and 2nd East Yorkshire Regiment) attached to the 3rd Infantry Division, nicknamed Monty's Ironsides. With this division, it landed at Sword Beach on D-Day and fought its way through the Normandy, the Netherlands and later the invasion of Germany.

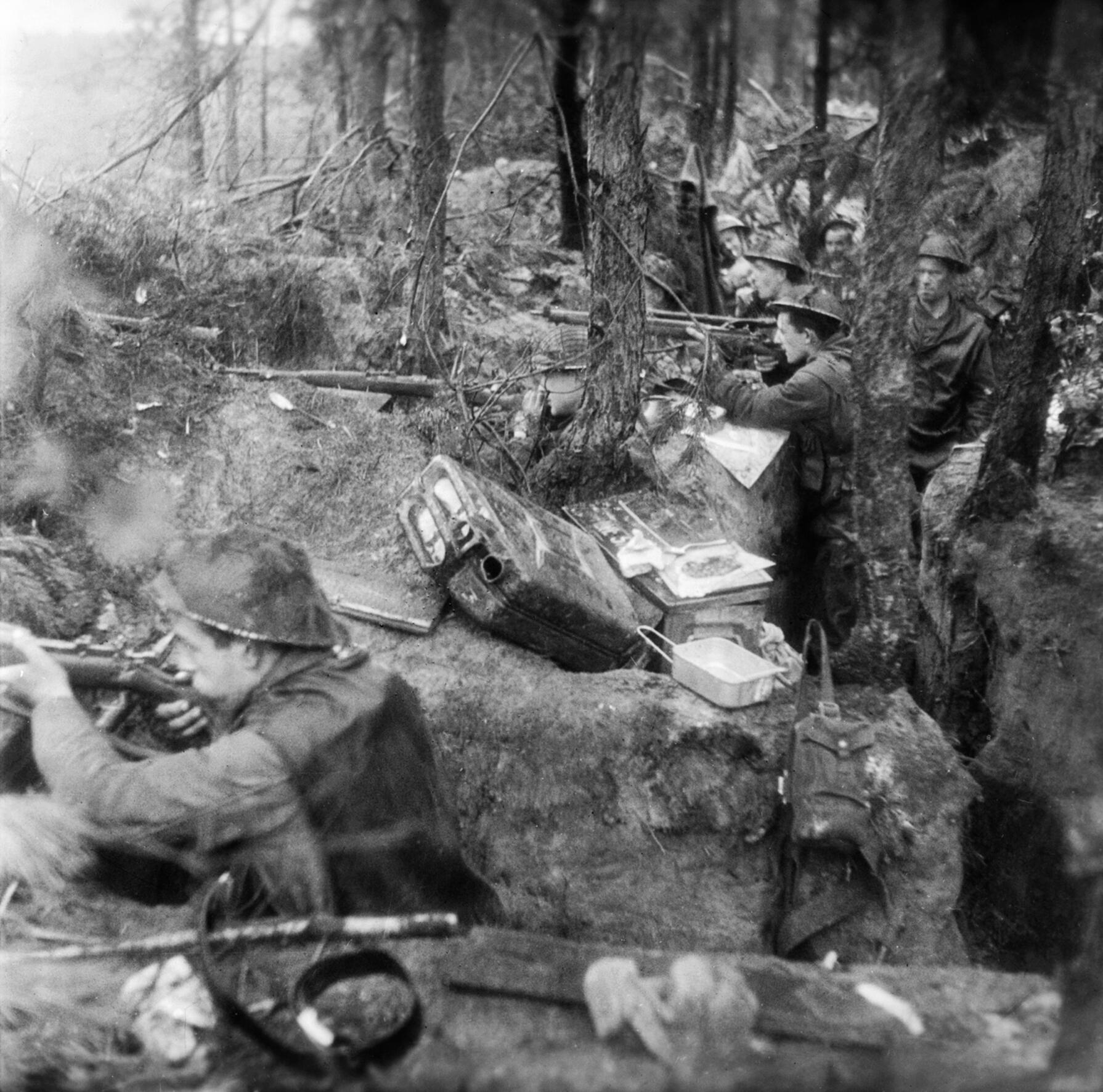
Men of the 1st Battalion in action in the Netherlands, November 1944

The 2nd Battalion was in Bombay in 1939, being transported back to Britain in July 1940 to defend the home front against the expected German invasion. In 1942, commanded by Lieutenant Colonel Michael West, later to become a full general, attached to the 29th Independent Infantry Brigade, it was part of Force 121, which invaded Madagascar in order to prevent use of the island by the Japanese. From April 1944 until the end of the war, it fought in the recapture of Burma, initially with the 36th Infantry Division alongside the 2nd Battalion, East Lancashire Regiment. The 2nd battalion was then transferred to the 114th Indian Infantry Brigade, 7th Indian Infantry Division, serving with them until July 1945, when the battalion came under command of the 20th Indian Division.

==== Territorial Army ====
The 2/4th Battalion was raised in 1939 as a 2nd Line Territorial Army battalion duplicate of the 1st Line 4th Battalion, later redesignated the 1/4th Battalion. Both the 1/4th and 2/4th battalions served in the 164th Infantry Brigade, part of the 55th (West Lancashire) Infantry Division. In 1943, the 2/4th Battalion was transferred to the British Army's airborne forces and converted to become the 13th Parachute Battalion of the Parachute Regiment, part of the 5th Parachute Brigade, which itself was part of the newly raised 6th Airborne Division. The 13th Parachute Battalion saw combat during Operation Tonga, the British airborne landings in the early hours of 6 June 1944, D-Day. The battalion served as normal infantrymen for the duration of the Battle of Normandy until being withdrawn, with the rest of the division, to England in September 1944. The 6th Airborne Division was then sent to Belgium in December 1944 to fight in the Ardennes offensive, the Battle of the Bulge. They were then involved in the largest airborne drop of the entire war with over 16,000 airborne troops taking part, known as Operation Varsity, with the US 17th Airborne Division.

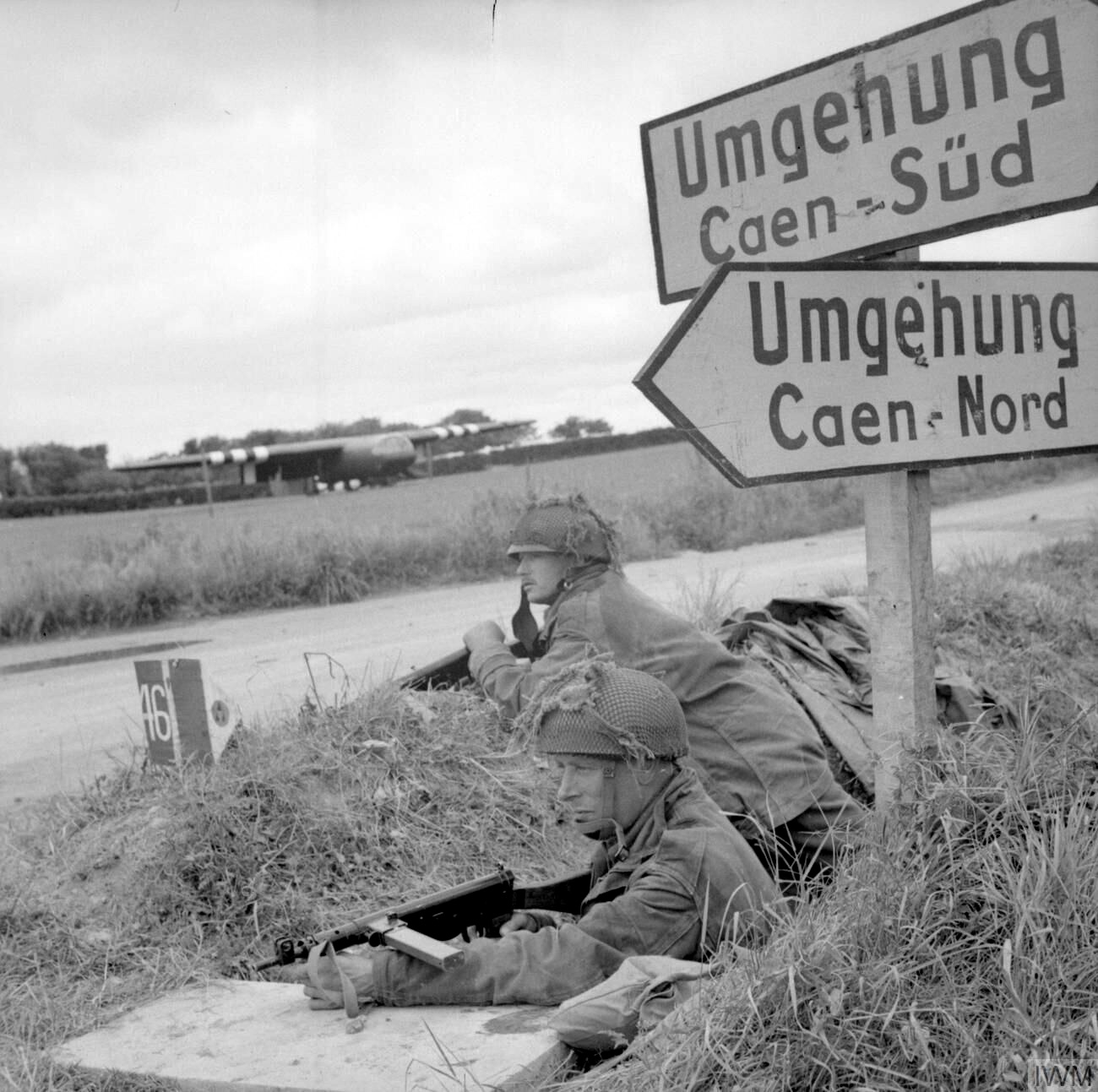
British paratroopers of the 13th Parachute Battalion in Normandy

The 5th Territorial Battalion of the regiment was transferred to the Royal Artillery before the war and converted into the 61st (South Lancashire) Searchlight Regiment. It served in North West England, in Orkney, and in Kent against V-1 flying bombs. In late 1944, it became the 61st (South Lancashire Regiment) Garrison Regiment, Royal Artillery. In early 1945, due to a severe shortage of infantrymen in the 21st Army Group, the regiment was converted into the 612th (South Lancashire Regiment) Infantry Regiment, Royal Artillery and joined the 306th Infantry Brigade, thereby releasing trained infantrymen for frontline service.

==== Hostilities-only ====
The regiment raised many other battalions for service before and during the war but most were disbanded before the war's end. The 6th (Home Defence) Battalion was raised in 1939 and, in 1941, was redesignated the 30th Battalion. It was disbanded in January 1943.

The 7th and 8th battalions were both raised in 1940 and joined the 204th Infantry Brigade. On 1 September 1942, the brigade was redesignated the 185th Infantry Brigade and the 7th Battalion was sent to India, where it remained until disbandment in 1946, as a training battalion with the 52nd Brigade. The battalion's role was training British infantry replacements in jungle warfare for the British Fourteenth Army.

The 50th (Holding) Battalion was raised in 1940. That October, it was redesignated as the 9th Battalion and joined the 225th Infantry Brigade and then the 207th Infantry Brigade. The battalion remained in the United Kingdom for the war and was later transferred to the 164th Infantry Brigade, alongside the 1/4th Battalion, and supplied replacements to units overseas. It was apparently disbanded in July 1944, but another source claims it was disbanded in 1946.

=== Peace and amalgamation ===
Immediately after the war, the 1st Battalion served in Egypt and Palestine before being reduced to a cadre and amalgamated with the 2nd Battalion at Trieste in 1948. The surviving 1st Battalion saw further service in the Sudan, Britain, Berlin and Hong Kong where, in 1958, it was amalgamated with 1st Battalion, the East Lancashire Regiment, to form 1st Battalion, the Lancashire Regiment (Prince of Wales's Volunteers) which was later amalgamated with the Loyal Regiment (North Lancashire) to form the Queen's Lancashire Regiment which was, however, merged with the King's Regiment (Liverpool and Manchester), the King's Own Royal Border Regiment, in 2007, to form the Duke of Lancaster's Regiment (King's, Lancashire and Border).

== Regimental museum ==
The Lancashire Infantry Museum is based at Fulwood Barracks in Preston.

== Battle honours ==
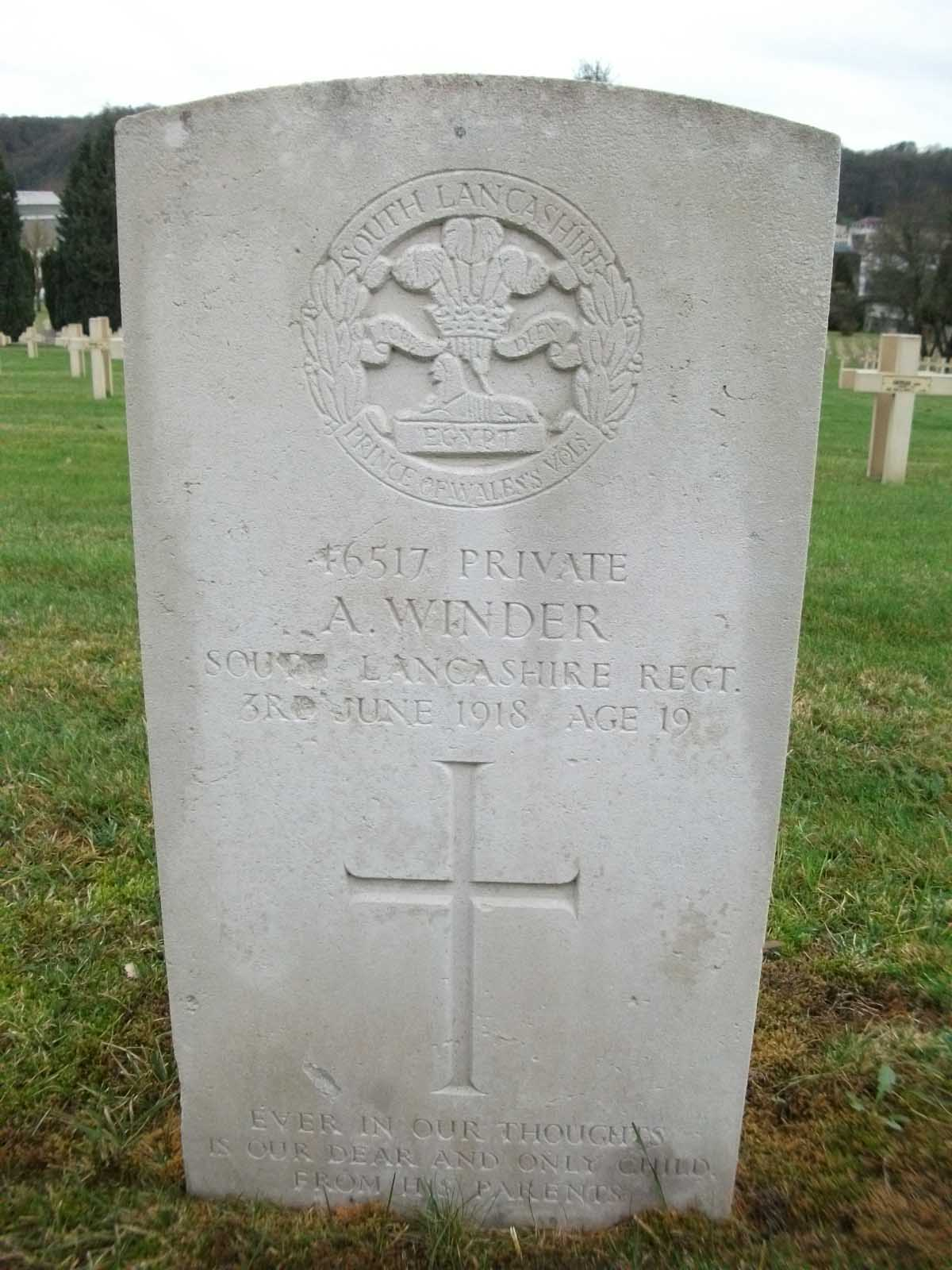
Grave of a South Lancashire private killed in 1918, in the Bar-le-Duc Cemetery.

The regiment was awarded the following battle honours:

- From 40th Regiment of Foot: Egypt, Monte Video, Rolica, Vimiera, Talavera, Badajoz, Salamanca, Vittoria, Pyrenees, Nivelle, Orthes, Toulouse, Peninsula, Waterloo, Candahar 1842, Ghuznee 1842, Cabool 1842, Maharajpore, New Zealand
- From 82nd Regiment of Foot: Rolica, Vimiera, Vittoria, Pyrenees, Nivelle, Orthes, Peninsula, Niagara, Sevastopol, Lucknow
- Louisburg, Martinique 1762, Havannah, St. Lucia 1778, Corunna, Relief of Ladysmith, South Africa 1899-1902
- Great War (20 battalions): Mons, Le Cateau, Retreat from Mons, Marne 1914, Aisne 1914 '18, La Bassée 1914, Messines 1914 '17 '18, Armentières 1914, Ypres 1914 '15 '17 '18, Nonne Bosschen, St. Julien, Frezenberg, Bellewaarde, Mount Sorrel^{1}, Somme 1916 '18, Albert 1916, Bazentin, Pozières, Guillemont, Ginchy, Flers-Courcelette, Morval, Le Transloy, Ancre Heights, Ancre 1916, Arras 1917 '18, Scarpe 1917 '18, Pilckem, Langemarck 1917, Menin Road, Polygon Wood, Passchendaele, Cambrai 1917 '18, St. Quentin, Bapaume 1918, Rosières, Lys, Estaires, Hazebrouck, Bailleul, Kemmel, Scherpenberg, Drocourt Quéant, Hindenburg Line, Canal du Nord, Courtrai, Selle, Sambre, France and Flanders 1914–18, Doiran 1917 '18, Macedonia 1915–18, Suvla, Sari Bair, Gallipoli 1915, Egypt 1916, Tigris 1916, Kut al Amara 1917, Baghdad, Mesopotamia 1916–18, Baluchistan 1918
- Afghanistan 1919
- Second World War: Dunkirk 1940, Normandy Landing, Odon, Bourguébus Ridge, Troarn, Falaise, Venraij, Rhineland, Hochwald, Bremen, North-West Europe 1940 '44-45, Madagascar, Middle East 1942, North Arakan, Mayu Tunnels, Kohima, Meiktila, Nyaungu Bridgehead, Letse, Irrawaddy, Sittang 1945, Burma 1943-45

1. Awarded in error, and withdrawn in 1925

== Victoria Crosses ==
The following members of the regiment were awarded the Victoria Cross:

- Colour-Serjeant John Lucas, New Zealand Wars
- Private William Ratcliffe, 2nd Battalion, Great War
- 2nd Lieutenant (later Captain), 3rd Battalion, Gabriel George Coury, Great War
- Private (later Sergeant) John Readitt, 6th (Service) Battalion, Great War
- Corporal (later Captain) John Thomas Davies, 11th (Service) Battalion, Great War

== Regimental Colonels ==
Colonels of the regiment were:

The Prince of Wales's Volunteers Regiment (South Lancashire Regiment)

- 1881–?1889 (1st Battalion): Gen. Augustus Halifax Ferryman, CB
- 1881–1889 (2nd Battalion): Gen. William Samuel Newton
- 1889–1893: Gen. Sir Henry Bates, KCB
- 1893–1900: Lt-Gen. Augustus Henry Lane Fox-Pitt-Rivers
- 1900–1909: Maj-Gen. Sir Frederick Richard Solly-Flood, KCB
- 1909–1921: Maj-Gen. Euston Henry Sartorius, VC, CB
- 1921–1940: Maj-Gen. Arthur Solly-Flood, CB, CMG, DSO

The South Lancashire Regiment (The Prince of Wales's Volunteers) - (1938)

- 1940–1948: Gen. Sir Harry Beauchamp Douglas Baird, KCB, CMG, CIE, DSO
- 1948–1957: Maj-Gen. Edmund Charles Beard, CB, CBE, MC
- 1957–1958: Brig. Joseph Henry Whalley-Kelly, CBE
- 1958: Regiment amalgamated with The East Lancashire Regiment to form The Lancashire Regiment (Prince of Wales's Volunteers)

== Sources ==
- J.B.M. Frederick, Lineage Book of British Land Forces 1660–1978, Vol I, Wakefield: Microform Academic, 1984, ISBN 1-85117-007-3.
- Gregory, Barry; Batchelor, John (1979). Airborne warfare, 1918-1945. Exeter, Devon: Exeter Books. ISBN 0-89673-025-5.
- Brig E.A. James, British Regiments 1914–18, London: Samson Books, 1978/Uckfield: Naval & Military Press, 2001, ISBN 978-1-84342-197-9.
- Mullaly, Colonel B.R. (1955). The South Lancashire Regiment (The Prince of Wales's Volunteers). Bristol: White Swan Press.
- Otway, Lieutenant-Colonel T.B.H. (1990). The Second World War 1939–1945 Army – Airborne Forces. Imperial War Museum. ISBN 0-901627-57-7.
- Westlake, Ray (2010). Tracing the Rifle Volunteers. Barnsley: Pen and Sword. ISBN 978-1-84884-211-3.
