= Gabriel Coury =

English Victoria Cross recipient (1896-1956)

- Gabriel Coury as depicted on a cigarette card
- Born: 13 June 1896; Liverpool, Lancashire, England
- Died: 23 February 1956 (aged 59); Liverpool, Lancashire, England
- Burial place: St Peter and St Paul Churchyard, Crosby
- Spouse: Katherine "Kitty" Mary Christina (m. 1918)
- Children: 3
- Military career
- Allegiance: United Kingdom
- Branch: British Army
- Rank: Captain
- Units: The South Lancashire Regiment; Royal Flying Corps; Royal Air Force; Royal Army Service Corps
- Conflicts: World War I World War II
- Awards: Victoria Cross

Gabriel George Coury VC (13 June 1896 – 23 February 1956), was an English recipient of the Victoria Cross, the highest and most prestigious award for gallantry in the face of the enemy that can be awarded to British and Commonwealth forces.

== Early years ==
Born on 13 June 1896 in Liverpool, (then part of Lancashire), to an Armenian-Lebanese father from Alexandria and a French mother of Lebanese origin from Beirut, Coury was educated at Stonyhurst College from 1907 to 1913. He worked as an apprentice in a cotton brokerage when World War I broke out. Coury volunteered to join Kitchener's Army in 1914.

== Victoria Cross ==
While Coury was a second lieutenant in the 3rd Battalion, The South Lancashire Regiment (The Prince of Wales's Volunteers) (attached to the 1/4th Battalion, South Lancashire Regiment, the pioneer battalion of the 55th (West Lancashire) Division), he performed deeds on 8 August 1916, near Arrow Head Copse, France, for which he was awarded the VC. His actions also earned him a promotion to full lieutenant.

=== Citation ===
For most conspicuous bravery. During an advance he was in command of two platoons ordered to dig a communication trench from the firing line to the position won. By his fine example and utter contempt of danger he kept up the spirits of his men and completed his task under intense fire. Later, after his battalion had suffered severe casualties and the Commanding Officer had been wounded, he went out in front of the advanced position in broad daylight and in full view of the enemy found his Commanding Officer, and brought him back to the new advanced trench over ground swept by machine-gun fire. He not only carried out his original tasks and saved his Commanding Officer, but also assisted in rallying the attacking troops when they were shaken and in leading them forward.

=== Royal Flying Corps ===
On 15 November 1916, Coury was seconded to the Royal Flying Corps as a flying officer (observer). He was appointed a flying officer on 20 September 1917, although his seniority was dated from 28 August 1917.

On 1 April 1918, Coury was transferred to the Royal Air Force on its establishment, and he subsequently transferred to the RAF Administrative Branch on 20 September 1918. On 30 September 1918, Coury was promoted to temporary captain in the Medical section of the Administrative Branch. He mustered out as a captain when the war ended.

=== Post war ===
After the war, Coury returned to his old firm as a cotton broker. When the Second World War broke out, he joined the Royal Army Service Corps and participated in the Normandy Landings.

== Personal life ==
Coury married Katherine "Kitty" Mary Christina (née Lovell) on 7 January 1918 in St Mary's Roman Catholic Church, Clapham, London. Katherine was a volunteer with a medical/welfare group during the First World War.

The couple had three daughters: Joan Marie Louise Coury, Carmen Katherine Mary Coury and Margaret Mary Coury.

Gabriel Coury died at his home in Liverpool on 23 February 1956.

== Legacy ==
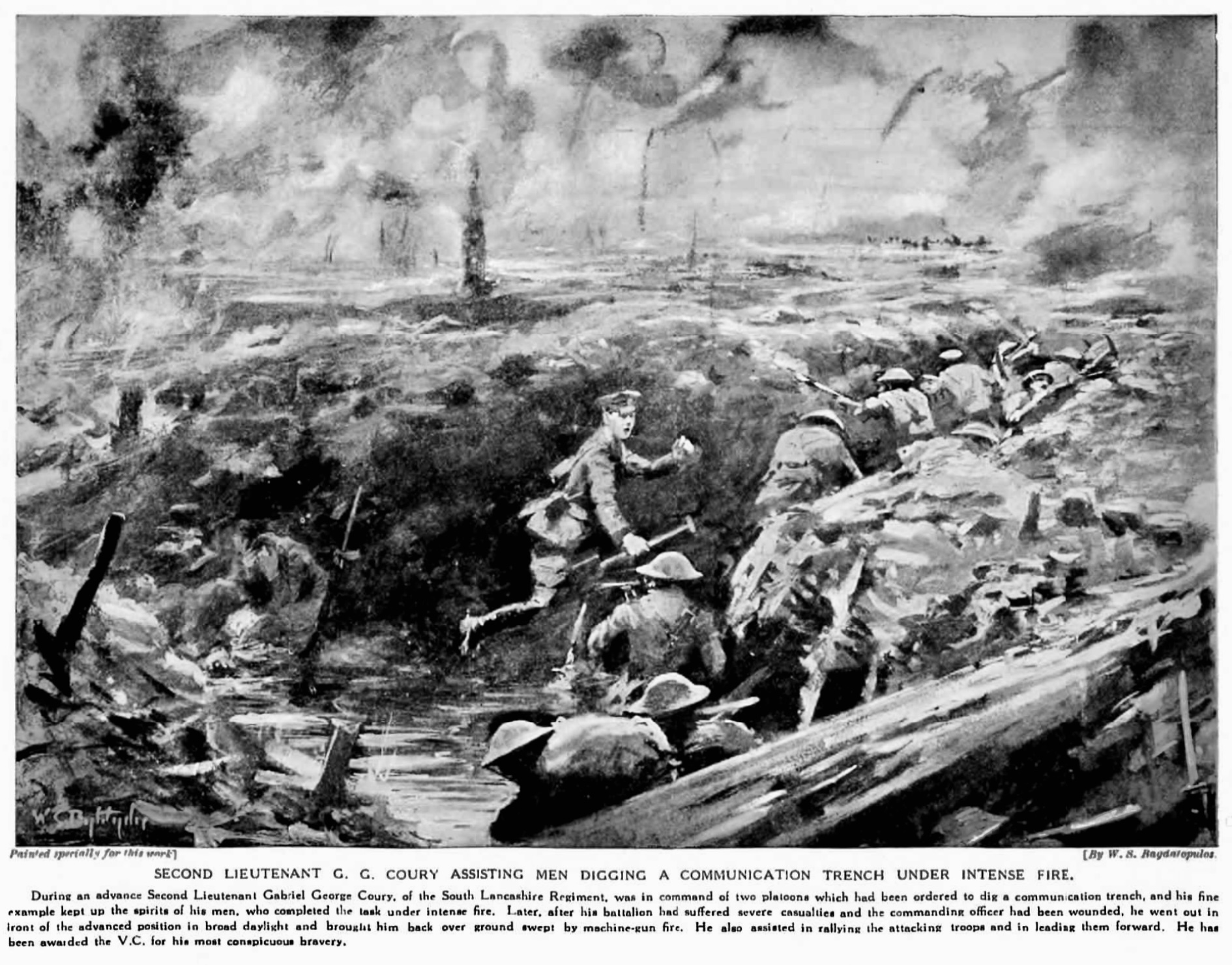
Illustration of Coury's action at Arrow Head Copse at the Battle of Guillemont which earned him the Victoria Cross. Painted by W.S. Bagdatopoulos.

Coury is honoured in a memorial at his former school, St Francis Xavier's College, Liverpool. His VC is on display at the Queen's Lancashire Regiment Museum at Fulwood Barracks in Preston, Lancashire. Coury also attended Stonyhurst College in Lancashire and a platoon of the Stonyhurst CCF is named in his honour. In addition, his portrait hangs alongside the other six Stonyhurst VCs in the Top Refectory.

== Bibliography ==
- VCs of the First World War - The Somme (Gerald Gliddon, 1994)
- The Register of the Victoria Cross (This England, 1997)
- Monuments to Courage (David Harvey, 1999)
- Murphy, James (2008). Liverpool VCs. Pen and Sword Books. ISBN 978-1844157808.
