= East Lancashire Regiment =

British Army regiment

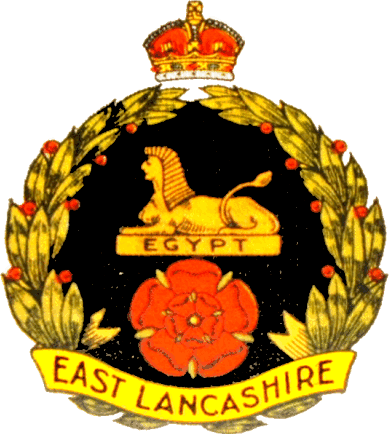
- Insignia of the East Lancashire Regiment.
- Active: 1 July 1881 – 1 July 1958
- Country: United Kingdom
- Branch: British Army
- Type: Infantry
- Role: Line infantry
- Size: 1–2 Regular battalions 1 Militia and Special Reserve battalion 2 Territorial and Volunteer battalions Up to 12 Hostilities-only battalions
- Garrison/HQ: Burnley Barracks (1881 – 1898); Fulwood Barracks, Preston (1898 – 1958)
- Motto: Spectamur agendo (judge us by our deeds)
- Colors: White facings
- Engagements: Second Boer War, Western Front (World War I), Battle of Dunkirk, Burma Campaign

The East Lancashire Regiment was, from 1881 to 1958, a line infantry regiment of the British Army. The regiment was formed in 1881 under the Childers Reforms by the amalgamation of the 30th (Cambridgeshire) Regiment of Foot and 59th (2nd Nottinghamshire) Regiment of Foot with the militia and rifle volunteer units of eastern Lancashire. In 1958 the regiment was amalgamated with the South Lancashire Regiment to form the Lancashire Regiment which was, in 1970, merged with the Loyal Regiment (North Lancashire) to form the Queen's Lancashire Regiment. In 2006, the Queen's Lancashire was further amalgamated with the King's Own Royal Border Regiment and the King's Regiment (Liverpool and Manchester) to form the present Duke of Lancaster's Regiment (King's, Lancashire and Border).

== History ==
=== Formation and service to 1914 ===
==== Regular battalions ====
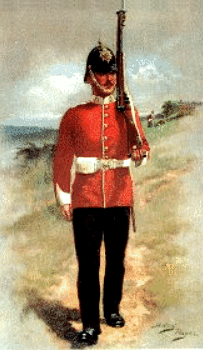
Private of the East Lancashire Regiment in pre-1914 full dress by Harry Payne (1858–1927)

The 1st Battalion was formed from the 30th (Cambridgeshire) Regiment of Foot (raised in 1702) and the 2nd Battalion from the 59th (2nd Nottinghamshire) Regiment of Foot (raised 1755) and the regiment was renamed the East Lancashire Regiment in July 1881.

Under the system introduced in 1881, one battalion of each infantry regiment was to serve at a home station while the other was in a foreign garrison or on active service. Due to the emergency caused by the outbreak of war in South Africa in 1899 most home service battalions were dispatched to the conflict. The 1st East Lancashire Regiment arrived at Cape Town in early February 1900, and remained posted in South Africa until after the war ended, leaving Cape Town again in November 1902.

East Lancashire Regiment's football team won the Mid-Ulster Cup in 1890. They beat inaugural winners Milford F.C. 2–0 at Brownlow, Lurgan, County Armagh.

1st Battalion		2nd Battalion	
Location	Years	Location	Years
India (Took part in the Chitral Expedition of 1895)	1881–1897	England	1881–1883
India (Took part in the Chitral Expedition of 1895)	1881–1897	Ireland	1883–1893
India (Took part in the Chitral Expedition of 1895)	1881–1897	Gibraltar	1893–1895
India (Took part in the Chitral Expedition of 1895)	1881–1897	England	1895–1897
England and Jersey	1897–1900	India	1897–1911
South Africa (Second Boer War)	1900–1902	India	1897–1911
Ireland	1905–1908	India	1897–1911
England	1908–1914	South Africa	1911–1914

==== Militia and volunteer/territorial battalions ====
The 1881 reforms also linked the militia and rifle volunteer units of the area into the regimental structure:

- The 5th Royal Lancashire Militia was redesignated as the 3rd (Militia) Battalion of the East Lancashire Regiment.
- The 2nd Lancashire Rifle Volunteer Corps, based at Blackburn: renamed to 1st Volunteer Battalion, East Lancashire Regiment in 1889
- The 3rd Lancashire Rifle Volunteer Corps, based at Burnley: renamed to 2nd Volunteer Battalion, East Lancashire Regiment in 1889

The militia was a reserve force that was only liable to service in the United Kingdom and in peace time assembled for period of annual training. In time of war it could be "embodied" or mobilised. When the war that broke out in South Africa in 1899 began to absorb a large amount of the regular army's resources, the terms of service of the militia were altered to allow them to serve in the war. The 3rd Battalion was embodied in January 1900 and served in South Africa until 1902. It was disembodied in March 1902. The battalion was awarded the battle honour "South Africa 1900–1902".

The volunteer battalions were organised for home defence purposes, and their members were subject to regular drills and training. Like the militia battalion, elements of the volunteers fought in South Africa. While members of the Volunteer Force could not be required to serve overseas, members from the battalions were voluntarily formed into Active Service Companies, providing reinforcements for the regular battalion. Both volunteer battalions were awarded battle honours for the war.

===== 1908 reorganisation =====
In 1908, under the Territorial and Reserve Forces Act 1907 the militia and volunteer force were reconstituted as the "Special Reserve" and "Territorial Force" (TF). Territorial battalions were renumbered in series after the special reserve battalions. The resulting titles were:

- 3rd (Special Reserve) Battalion
- 4th Battalion (TF) (formerly 1st Volunteer Battalion) at Canterbury Street in Blackburn
- 5th Battalion (TF) (formerly 2nd Volunteer Battalion) at Bank Parade in Burnley

The Territorial Force was restructured into 14 infantry divisions, and the 4th and 5th battalions formed part of the East Lancashire Brigade of the East Lancashire Division. It was as part of that division that were to be mobilised in August 1914 after the outbreak of World War I.

=== First World War ===
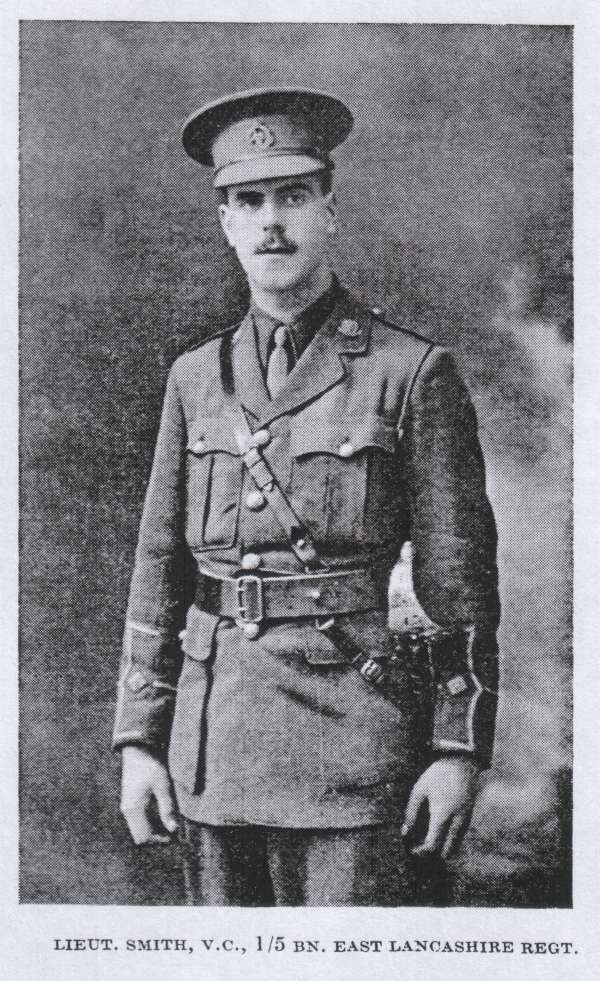
Second Lieutenant Alfred Victor Smith 1/5th Battalion, posthumously awarded the Victoria Cross for gallantry at Helles in December 1915

The size of the regiment was increased during the conflict, reaching a total of 17 battalions.

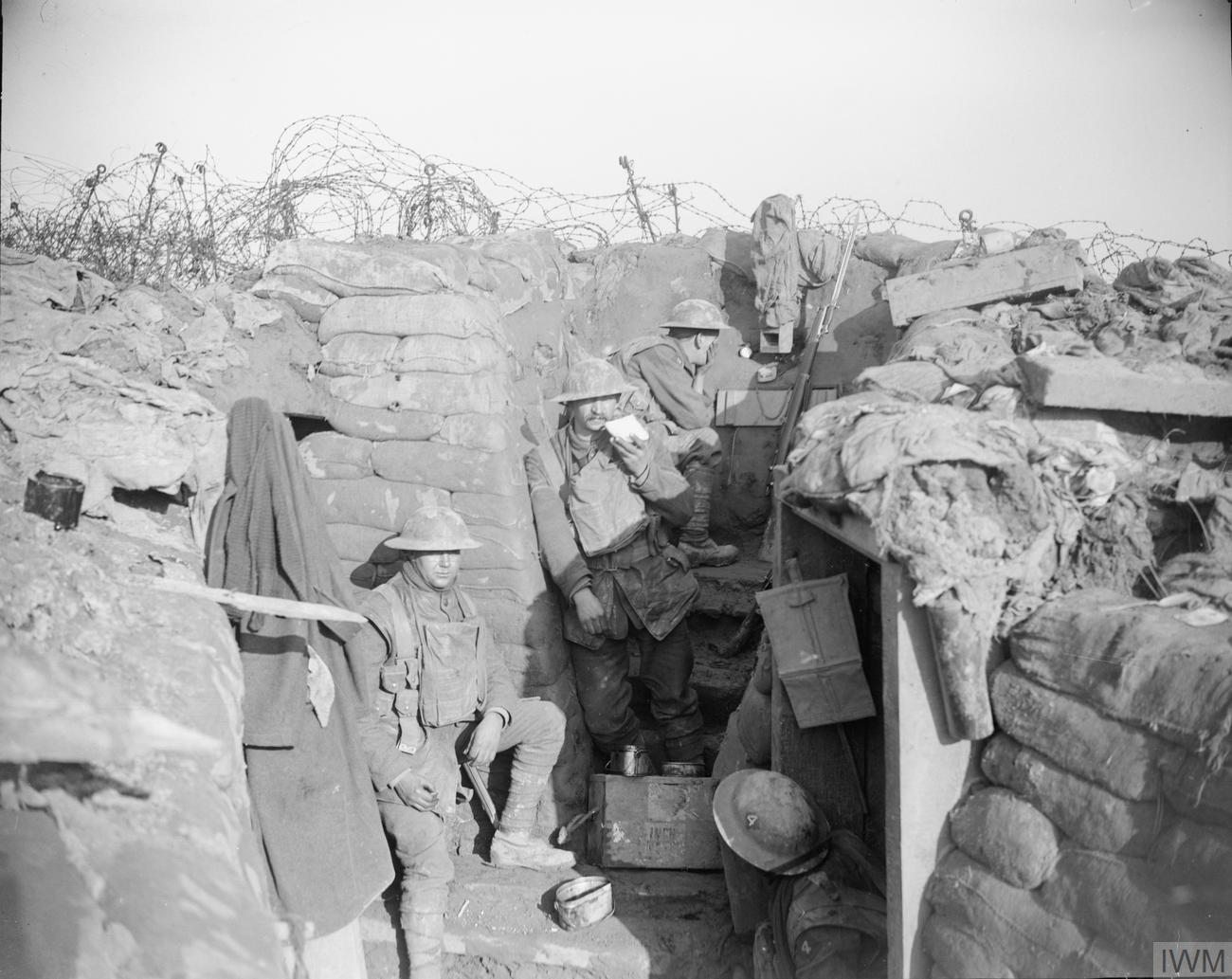
Members of the 4th Battalion, East Lancashire Regiment in trenches near Givenchy on 28 June 1918

Battalion	Notes	Service
1st	Regular battalion	Western Front August 1914 – 1918
2nd	Regular battalion	in South Africa at outbreak of war, Western Front November 1914 – 1918
3rd	Special Reserve	Embodied at Preston August 1914, served in home stations at Plymouth and Marske by the Sea
1/4th	Redesignation of 4th (TF) Battalion on formation of duplicate 2/4th in September 1914	Egypt September 1914, Gallipoli 1915, Egypt 1916, Western Front 1917 - 1918. Redesignated as 4th Battalion in 1918
2/4th	Duplicate of 4th Battalion formed September 1914	Home service until March 1917, Western Front March 1917 – February 1918, when it was absorbed by 1/4th.
3/4th	Formed March 1915 as duplicate of 1/4th	Depot and training unit remained in UK
1/5th	Redesignation of 5th (TF) Battalion on formation of duplicate 2/5th in September 1914	Egypt September 1914, Gallipoli 1915, Egypt 1916, Western Front 1917 - 1918.
2/5th	Duplicate of 5th Battalion formed September 1914	Home service until March 1917, Western Front March 1917 – 1918. Disbanded July 1918.
3/5th	Formed March 1915 as duplicate of 1/5th	Depot and training unit remained in UK.
6th	Service battalion formed August 1914.	Gallipoli July 1915, Egypt January 1916, Mesopotamia February 1916 – 1918
7th	Service battalion formed September 1914	Western Front 1915 – 1918. Disbanded February 1918.
8th	Service battalion formed September 1914	Western Front 1915 – 1918. Disbanded February 1918., officers and men transferred to 11th Battalion
9th	Service battalion formed September 1914	Western Front September – November 1915. Salonika November 1915 – 1918.
10th	Service battalion formed October 1914	Home Service. Converted to reserve battalion 1915, redesignated 47th Training Reserve Battalion 1916 and ceased to be part of the regiment.
11th	"Accrington Pals": Service battalion formed September 1914 by mayor and corporation of Accrington	Egypt December 1915 – March 1916, Western Front March 1916 – 1918
12th	Reserve battalion of the Accrington Pals formed May 1915	Redesignated 75th Training Reserve Battalion 1916 and ceased to be part of the regiment.
13th	Redesignation of 8th Garrison Guard Battalion July 1918.	Western Front

==== Victoria Crosses ====
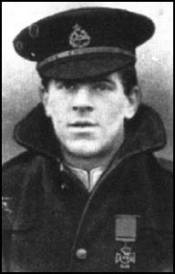
Spencer John Bent VC

Four members of the regiment were awarded the Victoria Cross for gallantry:

- Drummer Spencer John Bent, 1st Battalion (Le Gheer, Belgium, 1 –2 November 1914)
- Private William Young, 8th Battalion (Fonquevillers, France, 22 December 1915)
- Second Lieutenant Alfred Victor Smith, 1/5th Battalion (Helles, Galliopoli, Turkey, 23 December 1915)
- Second Lieutenant Basil Arthur Horsfall, attached to 11th Battalion (Between Moyenneville and Ablainzevelle, France, 21 March 1918)

=== Inter war ===
Between the Wars the East Lancs served in many conflicts including Baluchistan, Afghanistan, Ireland, Turkey, Palestine and the North West Frontier of India.

1st Battalion		2nd Battalion	
Location	Years	Location	Years
West Indies	1919–22	Ireland	1919–1923
Malta	1922–1923	Ireland	1919–1923
Egypt	1923–1924	England	1923–1933
India	1924–1931	England	1923–1933
China	1932–1933	England	1923–1933
England	1933–1934	Hong Kong	1933–1937
Saarland	1934–1935	Hong Kong	1933–1937
England	1935–1936	Hong Kong	1933–1937
Northern Ireland	1936–1939	Hong Kong	1933–1937
Northern Ireland	1936–1939	India	1937–1939

=== Second World War ===
The East Lancashire Regiment was again increased in size for the duration of the Second World War, although not to such an extent as in 1914–1918. Firstly, prior to the outbreak of hostilities in 1939, the entire Territorial Army was doubled in size, with each unit forming a duplicate. Secondly, a number of wartime battalions were formed.

Battalion	Notes	Service
1st	Regular battalion	The 1st Battalion, commanded initially by Lieutenant Colonel James Willie Pendlebury, served in France in 1940 with the 126th Infantry Brigade attached to the 42nd (East Lancashire) Infantry Division. The battalion fought in the Battle of Dunkirk and had to be evacuated to the UK. During the retreat to Dunkirk Captain Andrews was awarded the Victoria Cross. 1944 with 71st Infantry Brigade, transferred to 158th Infantry Brigade, 53rd (Welsh) Infantry Division – 1945
2nd	Regular battalion	In British India at outbreak of war. To United Kingdom in 1940. South Africa, Madagascar and East Africa 1942 with 29th Independent Infantry Brigade Group –1943, India and Burma 1943 – 1945
4th	1st Line Territorial battalion. Formed 1939 when 4th/5th Battalion was duplicated.	North West Europe 1940 with 127th Infantry Brigade, 42nd (East Lancashire) Infantry Division. Following the Dunkirk evacuation, it remained with the division on home defense duties. For most of 1942, the battalion was deployed to Northern Ireland. It then returned to the United Kingdom, and home defense duties, as part of the 76th Infantry Division. In 1944, the battalion became a training formation and was initially posted to the 80th Infantry (Reserve) Division, and finally the 38th Infantry (Reserve) Division.
5th	2nd Line Territorial battalion. Formed 1939 when 4th/5th Battalion was duplicated.	North West Europe 1944–1945. Formed part of 197th Brigade (with the 1/7th Royal Warwicks and the 2/5th Lancashire Fusiliers), 59th (Staffordshire) Infantry Division during its few months in action following the D-Day landings in the area of Galmanche near Epron during Operation Charnwood. Disbanded August 1944 due to manpower shortage
6th	Home Defence battalion formed August 1939.	Renumbered 30th Battalion 1941.
7th		Raised 1940, transferred to Royal Artillery and converted to 103rd Light Anti-Aircraft Regiment, Royal Artillery, December 1941, served with 55th (West Lancashire) Infantry Division, 61st Infantry Division, disbanded March 1944.
8th		Raised 1940 from 50th (Holding) Battalion, converted to 144th Regiment Royal Armoured Corps in 1941 and served in 33rd Armoured Brigade in the Normandy landings on 6 June 1944. The regiment continued to wear its East Lancashire cap badge on the black beret of the RAC. On 1 March 1945 144 RAC was redesignated 4th Royal Tank Regiment to replace the original 4th RTR, which had been lost at Tobruk in 1942.
30th (renumbered from 6th Battalion 1941)	Home Defence battalion	Disbanded 1943
50th	Holding battalion	Formed from the East Lancashire company of a Mixed Holding battalion at Huyton; brought to full war establishment by a draft of men returned from the Dunkirk evacuation and renumbered 8th 1940.

==== Victoria Cross ====
Captain Harold Marcus Ervine-Andrews of the 1st Battalion was awarded the Victoria Cross for gallantry at Dunkirk on 31 May – 1 June 1940.

=== Post war ===
In 1948 the regiment was reduced to a regular battalion which served in the Middle East, Malaya, the Suez Canal Zone, India and Aden. In 1957 defence cuts were announced that significantly reduced the size of the army. As a result, the East Lancashire Regiment was amalgamated with The South Lancashire Regiment on 1 July 1958 to form The Lancashire Regiment (Prince of Wales's Volunteers). In 1970 the Lancashire Regiment was in turn amalgamated with the Loyal Regiment (North Lancashire) to form the Queen's Lancashire Regiment. In 2006 the Queen's Lancashire Regiment was merged with the King's Own Royal Border Regiment and King's Regiment (Liverpool and Manchester) to form a new large regiment, the Duke of Lancaster's Regiment (King's, Lancashire and Border).

== Regimental museum ==
The Lancashire Infantry Museum is based at Fulwood Barracks in Preston.

== Badges ==
When the two regiments of foot merged in 1881, new badges were designed that would endure for the rest of the regiment's existence, subject to changes in the style of crown, and which would be worn on the later service dress and battle dress uniforms. The headdress badge selected for the centre of the full dress helmet was a sphinx upon a plinth inscribed "EGYPT". The sphinx had been awarded to the 30th Foot in 1802 to mark its participation in repelling the French invasion of Egypt. The collar badge selected was the Red Rose of Lancaster to mark the regiment's county affiliation. In 1897 a khaki uniform featuring a slouch hat was introduced, and a metal cap badge was devised for each regiment or corps. The badge of the East Lancs was the sphinx and "Egypt" above the rose, the whole enclosed within a laurel wreath topped by a crown. The laurel wreath had formed part of the insignia of the 59th Foot. A scroll inscribed "EAST LANCASHIRE" at the base of the badge completed the design.

== Battle honours ==
The regiment was awarded the following battle honours (those selected for display on the colour are indicated in bold):

- Earlier wars:
  - Gibraltar 1704–05, Belle isle, Chitral, South Africa 1900–02
- First World War:
  - Le Cateau, **Retreat from Mons**, **Marne 1914**, **Aisne 1914, '18**, Armentières 1914, **Neuve Chapelle**, **Ypres 1915, '17, '18**, St Julien, Frezenberg, Bellewaarde, Aubers, **Somme 1916, '18**, Albert 1916, '18, Bazentin, Pozières, Le Transloy, Ancre 1916, '18, **Arras 1917, '18**, Scarpe 1917, '18, Arleux, Oppy, Messines 1917, Pilckem, Langemarck 1917, Polygon Wood, Broodseinde, Poelcapelle, Passchendaele, St Quentin, Bapaume 1918, Rosières, Villers Bretonneux, Lys, Estaires, Hazebrouck, Bailleul, Kemmel, Hindenburg Line, Canal du Nord, Cambrai 1918, Selle, Valenciennes, Sambre, France and Flanders 1914–18, Kosturino, **Doiran 1917, '18**, Macedonia 1915–18, **Helles**, Krithia, Suvla, Sari Bair, Gallipoli 1915, Rumani, Egypt 1915–17, Tigris 1916, **Kut al Amara 1917**, Baghdad, Mesopotamia 1916–17
- Second World War:
  - Defence of Escaut, **Dunkirk 1940**, Caen, **Falaise**, Nederrijn, **Lower Maas**, **Ourthe**, Rhineland, **Reichswald**, **Weeze**, Rhine, Ibbenburen, **Aller**, North-West Europe 1940 '44-45, **Madagascar**, North Arakan, **Pinwe**, **Burma 1944-45**

== Regimental Colonels ==
Colonels of the regiment were:

- 1881–1889?: (1st Battalion): Gen. Sir George Vaughan Maxwell, KCB (ex 30th Foot)
- 1881–1889: (2nd Battalion): Gen. Henry Eyre (ex 59th Foot)
- 1889–1890: Gen. Sir Edmund Augustus Whitmore, KCB
- 1890–1913: Lt-Gen. Thomas Henry Pakenham, CB
- 1913–1920: Lt-Gen. Sir Percy Henry Noel Lake, KCB, KCMG
- 1920–1932: Maj-Gen. Sir Cecil Lothian Nicholson, KCB, CMG
- 1932–1944: F.M. Sir John Greer Dill, GCB, CMG, DSO
- 1944–1946: Maj-Gen. Hugh Tennent MacMullen, CB, CBE, MC
- 1946–1956: Brig. James Willie Pendlebury, DSO, MC
- 1956–1958: Maj-Gen. William Harold Lambert, CB, CBE (to Lancashire Regiment)
- 1958: Regiment amalgamated with The South Lancashire Regiment (Prince of Wales's Volunteers) to form The Lancashire Regiment (Prince of Wales's Volunteers)
