= Marcus Ervine-Andrews =

Irish-born British Army officer

Marcus Ervine-Andrews VC
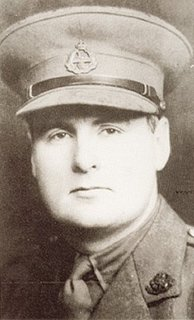
- Born: 29 July 1911; Keadue, County Cavan, Ireland
- Died: 30 March 1995 (aged 83); Gorran, Cornwall, England
- Spouses: Emily Torrie (m. 1939–1952) Margaret Gregory (m. 1981)
- Military career
- Allegiance: United Kingdom
- Branch: British Army
- Service years: 1932–1952
- Rank: Lieutenant-Colonel
- Service number: 50928
- Units: East Lancashire Regiment
- Conflicts: North-West Frontier; Second World War
- Awards: Victoria Cross

Lieutenant-Colonel Harold Marcus Ervine-Andrews, VC (29 July 1911 – 30 March 1995) was a British Army officer and an Anglo-Irish recipient of the Victoria Cross, the highest award for gallantry that can be awarded to British and the Commonwealth forces, for his actions during the Second World War.

== Early life ==
Marcus Ervine-Andrews was born in Keadue, County Cavan, Ireland, on 29 July 1911, the son of a bank manager. He was educated by the Jesuits at Stonyhurst College, Lancashire, one of seven recipients of the VC who were educated at Stonyhurst.

Ervine-Andrews was commissioned in the East Lancashire Regiment, British Army in January 1932. He was sent to the Indian North West Frontier in 1936–37, where he was Mentioned in Despatches.

== Events at Dunkirk ==
Ervine-Andrews was 28 years old, and a captain in the 1st Battalion, East Lancashire Regiment (part of the 1st Infantry Division), in the latter stages of the Battle of Dunkirk, when the following deed took place for which he was awarded the VC. During the night of 31 May/1 June 1940, near Dunkirk, France, the company commanded by Captain Ervine-Andrews had been ordered to defend 1,000 yards (910 m) of territory. Already heavily outnumbered and under intense German fire, when the enemy attacked at dawn and crossed the Canal de Bergues, Ervine-Andrews, with volunteers from his company, rushed to a barn and from the roof, shot 17 of the enemy with a rifle, and many more with a Bren gun. When the barn was shattered and alight, he sent the wounded to the rear and led the remaining eight men back.

=== Victoria Cross citation ===
The announcement and accompanying citation for the decoration were published in supplement to the London Gazette on 30 July 1940, reading:

War Office, 30th July, 1940.

His Majesty The KING has been pleased to approve of the award of the Victoria Cross to the undermentioned: —

Lieutenant (acting Captain) (now Captain) Harald Marcus ERVINE-ANDREWS, The East Lancashire Regiment.

For most conspicuous gallantry on active service on the night of the 31st May/1st June, 1940. Captain Ervine-Andrews took over about a thousand yards of the defences in front of Dunkirk, his line extending along the Canal de Bergues, and the enemy attacked at dawn. For over ten hours, notwithstanding intense artillery, mortar, and machine-gun fire, and in the face of vastly superior enemy forces, Captain Ervine-Andrews and his company held their position.

The enemy, however, succeeded in crossing the canal on both flanks; and, owing to superior enemy forces, a company of Captain Ervine-Andrews' own battalion, which was dispatched to protect his flanks, was unable to gain contact with him. There being danger of one of his platoons being driven in, he called for volunteers to fill the gap, and then, going forward, climbed onto the top of a straw-roofed barn, from which he engaged the enemy with rifle and light automatic fire, though, at the time, the enemy were sending mortar-bombs and armour-piercing bullets through the roof.

Captain Ervine-Andrews personally accounted for seventeen of the enemy with his rifle, and for many more with a Bren gun. Later, when the house which he held had been shattered by enemy fire and set alight, and all his ammunition had been expended, he sent back his wounded in the remaining carrier. Captain Ervine-Andrews then collected the remaining eight men of his company from this forward position, and, when almost completely surrounded, led them back to the cover afforded by the company in the rear, swimming or wading up to the chin in water for over a mile; having brought all that remained of his company safely back, he once again took up position.

Throughout this action, Captain Ervine-Andrews displayed courage, tenacity, and devotion to duty, worthy of the highest traditions of the British Army, and his magnificent example imbued his own troops with the dauntless fighting spirit which he himself displayed.

== Post-war ==
Ervine-Andrews attempted to return home to his native County Cavan after the war, but was driven out by local members of the IRA, living initially in Whiteabbey in Northern Ireland and later settled in Cornwall. He later achieved the rank of lieutenant-colonel.

From 1955 he was involved with the Leonard Cheshire Foundation, first as the Warden of Wardour Castle Cheshire Home. After the Home closed in early 1957, he continued to advise the foundation on the setting up of new Cheshire Homes.

== Personal life ==
Ervine-Andrews married Emily Torrie in 1939. They had two children, a girl born in 1941 and a boy in 1943 Their marriage was dissolved in 1952. She died in 1975.

In 1981, he married Margaret Gregory.

== Death ==
The last surviving Irishman to be awarded the VC for service during the Second World War, Ervine-Andrews died in his home at Gorran, Cornwall on 30 March 1995, at the age of 83. His memorial is at Stonyhurst College. He bequeathed his VC medal to the Lancashire Infantry Museum, but at his request it is on display at Blackburn Museum and Art Gallery.
