= Bank Parade drill hall =

Former military installation in Burnley, UK

- Burnley
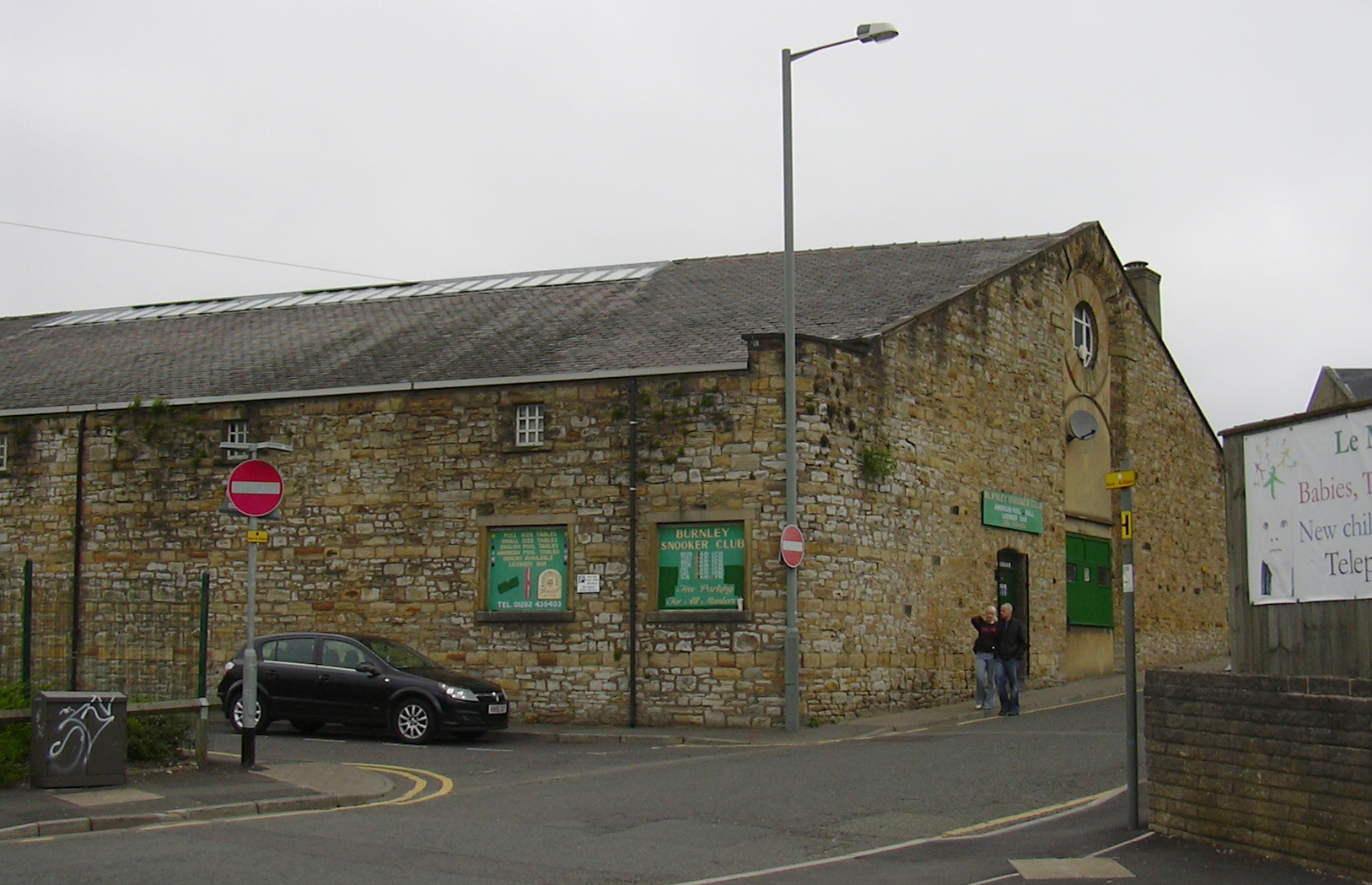
- Bank Parade drill hall

Site information
- Type: Drill hall

Location
- Location in Lancashire
- Coordinates: 53.79082°N 2.24055°W

Site history
- Built: Early 20th century
- Built for: War Office
- In use: Early 20th century – 1921

The Bank Parade drill hall, also known as the Keighley Green Drill Hall, is a former military installation in Burnley, Lancashire.

== History ==
The building was designed as the headquarters of the 2nd Volunteer Battalion, The East Lancashire Regiment and completed in the early 20th century. The unit evolved to become the 5th Battalion, The East Lancashire Regiment in 1908. The battalion was mobilised at the drill hall in August 1914 before being deployed to Gallipoli and ultimately to the Western Front. More recruits, this time for Z Company, the 11th (Service) Battalion (Accrington), East Lancashire Regiment, were also assembled at the drill hall the following month.

The battalion amalgamated with the 4th Battalion to form the 4th/5th Battalion at the Canterbury Street drill hall in Blackburn in 1921. The drill hall was decommissioned and it became a well-established boxing venue during the 1930s. It was used by the Home Guard during the Second World War and currently operates as a snooker club.
