= King's Division =

British Army command

- Active: 1968–2022
- Country: United Kingdom
- Branch: British Army
- Type: Administrative Command

The King's Division was a British Army command, training and administrative apparatus designated for infantry regiments in the North of England.

== History ==
The King's Division was formed in 1968 with the union of the Lancastrian Brigade, Yorkshire Brigade and North Irish Brigade. The depot was established at Queen Elizabeth Barracks in Strensall.

Under the restructuring announced in 2004, the King's Division was reorganized into two large regiments:

- The Duke of Lancaster's Regiment (King's Lancashire and Border)
- The Yorkshire Regiment (14th/15th, 19th and 33rd/76th Foot)

In 2017 the Mercian Regiment moved to the King's Division.

The King's Division therefore comprised the following infantry battalions:

- Regular Army Units
  - 1st Battalion, The Duke of Lancaster's Regiment (King's Lancashire and Border)
  - 1st & 2nd Battalions, The Yorkshire Regiment (14th/15th, 19th and 33rd/76th Foot)
  - 1st Battalion, The Mercian Regiment (Cheshire, Worcesters and Foresters, and Staffords)
- Army Reserve Units
  - 4th Battalion, The Duke of Lancaster's Regiment (King's Lancashire and Border)
  - 4th Battalion, The Yorkshire Regiment (14th/15th, 19th and 33rd/76th Foot)
  - 4th Battalion, the Mercian Regiment (Cheshire, Worcesters and Foresters, and Staffords)

In addition, the King's Division also maintained a single regular army band titled the Band of the King's Division, which was a component band of British Army Bands Catterick. The Band was formed through the amalgamation of two former divisional bands, the Normandy Band and the Waterloo Band. Each of the three regiments, maintains a band within the reserve battalion; them being: The Band of the Yorkshire Regiment, The Band of the Mercian Regiment, and The Band of The Duke of Lancaster's Regiment.

== Past units ==
Past units include:

- 1st Battalion, The King's Own Royal Border Regiment (1959–2006)
- 1st Battalion, The King's Regiment (1958–2006)
- 1st Battalion, The Prince of Wales's Own Regiment of Yorkshire (1958–2006)
- 1st Battalion, The Green Howards (Alexandra, Princess of Wales's Own Yorkshire Regiment) (1688–2006)
- 1st Battalion, The Royal Irish Rangers (27th (Inniskilling) 83rd and 87th) (1968–1992)
- 2nd Battalion, The Royal Irish Rangers (27th (Inniskilling) 83rd and 87th) (1968–1992)
- 3rd Battalion, The Royal Irish Rangers (27th (Inniskilling) 83rd and 87th) (1968)
- 1st Battalion, The Duke of Wellington's Regiment (West Riding) (1881–2006)
- 1st Battalion, The Lancashire Regiment (Prince of Wales's Volunteers) (1958–1970)
- 1st Battalion, The Loyal Regiment (North Lancashire) (1881–1970)
- 1st Battalion, The Queen's Lancashire Regiment (1970–2006)
- 1st Battalion, The Duke of Lancaster's Regiment (King's, Lancashire and Border) (2006–2021)
- 3rd Battalion, The Duke of Lancaster's Regiment (King's, Lancashire and Border) (2006–2007)
- 3rd Battalion, The Yorkshire Regiment (14th/15th, 19th and 33rd/76th Foot) (2006–2013)
- 2nd Battalion, The Mercian Regiment (Cheshire, Worcesters and Foresters, and Staffords) (2017—2022)
- 3rd Battalion Yorkshire Volunteers 1967-1993

== Sources ==
- Heyman, Charles (2012). The British Army: A Pocket Guide, 2012–2013. Pen & Sword. ISBN 9781848841079.
