= John Readitt =

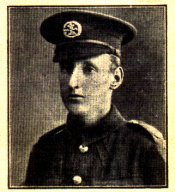
- Born: 19 January 1897; Clayton, Manchester
- Died: 9 June 1964 (aged 67); Manchester
- Burial place: Gorton Cemetery, Manchester
- Military career
- Allegiance: United Kingdom
- Branch: British Army
- Service years: 1915 - 1919
- Rank: Sergeant
- Units: The South Lancashire Regiment
- Conflicts: World War I
- Awards: Victoria Cross; Bronze Medal of Military Valor (Italy)

John Readitt VC (19 January 1897 – 9 June 1964) was an English recipient of the Victoria Cross, the highest and most prestigious award for gallantry in the face of the enemy that can be awarded to British and Commonwealth forces.

== Details ==
He was 20 years old, and a private in the 6th Battalion, The South Lancashire Regiment (The Prince of Wales's Volunteers), British Army during the First World War when the following deed took place for which he was awarded the VC.

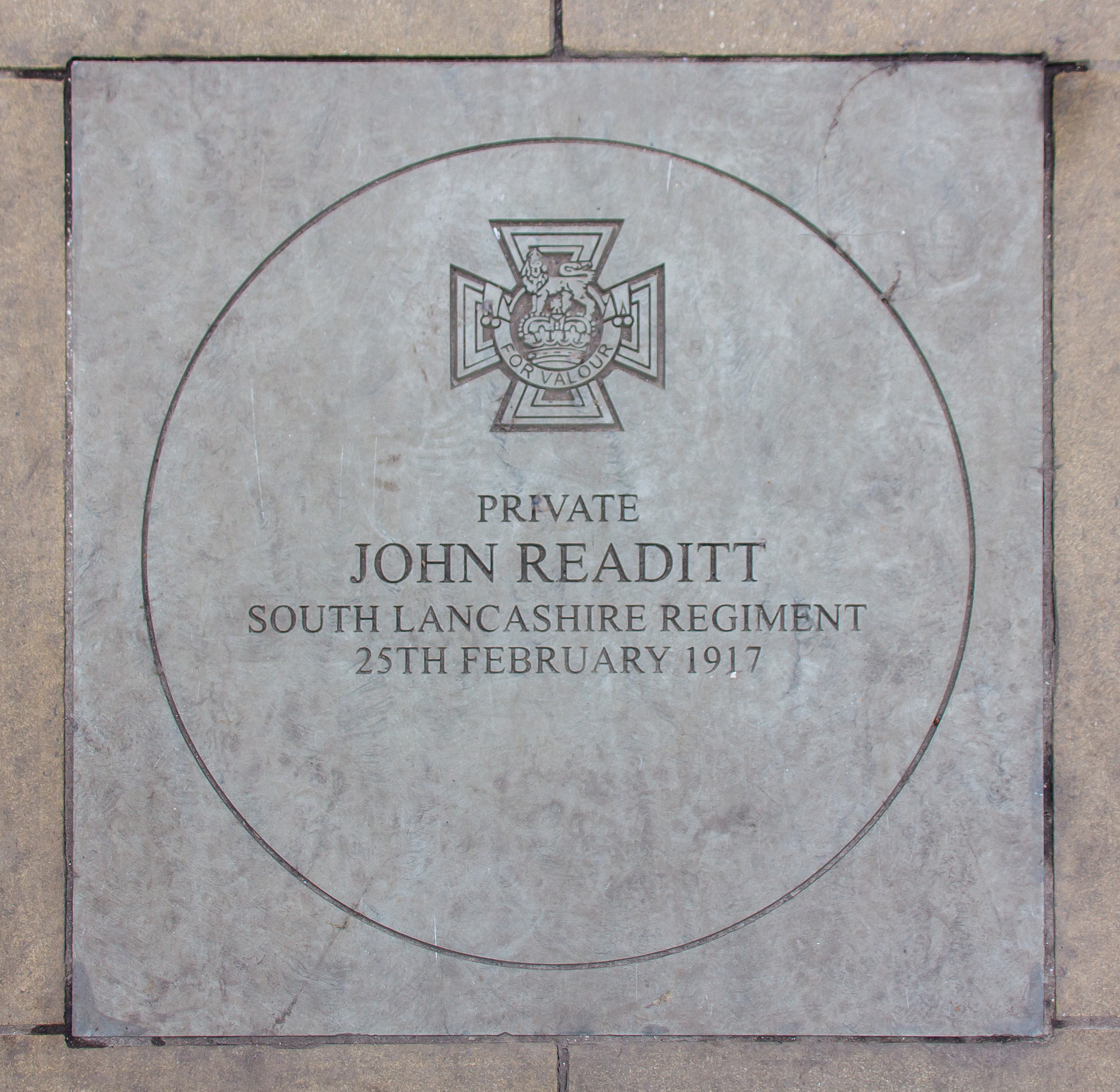
Plaque at the Manchester Cenotaph

On 25 February 1917 at Alqayat-al-Gaharbigah Bend, Mesopotamia, Private Readitt advanced five times along a water-course in the face of heavy machine-gun fire at very close range, being the sole survivor on each occasion. These advances drove the enemy back and about 300 yards of the water-course was made good in an hour. After his officer had been killed, Private Readitt, on his own initiative, made several more advances. On reaching the enemy barricade he was forced to retire, but gave ground slowly continuing to throw bombs. When support reached him he held a forward bend by bombing until the position was consolidated.

== Further information ==
He later achieved the rank of Sergeant. Readitt was also awarded the Bronze Medal of Military Valor by Italy.

== Bibliography ==
- Gliddon, Gerald (2005). The Sideshows. VCs of the First World War. Gloucestershire, England: Sutton Publishing. ISBN 978-0-7509-2084-1.
