= Duke of Lancaster's Regiment =

Infantry regiment of the British Army

The Duke of Lancaster's Regiment (King's, Lancashire and Border)
- Cap badge of the regiment
- Active: 1 July 2006 – present
- Country: United Kingdom
- Branch: British Army
- Type: Line Infantry
- Role: 1st Battalion – Infantry; 4th Battalion – Army Reserve
- Size: Two battalions
- Part of: Queen's Division
- Garrison/HQ: RHQ – Preston; 1st Battalion – Preston; 4th Battalion – Preston
- Nickname: Lions of England
- Motto: "Nec Aspera Terrent" (Latin) "Difficulties be Damned"
- March: Quick – John Peel; Slow – The Red Rose
- Anniversaries: Ladysmith (28 February), St George's Day (23 April), Waterloo (18 June), Arroyo (28 October)
- Engagements: Operation Telic; Operation Herrick

Commanders
- Colonel-in-Chief: King Charles III
- Colonel of the Regiment: Brigadier Robert J. Singleton

Insignia
- Arm Badge: Glider; From King's Own Royal Border Regiment
- Abbreviation: LANCS

The Duke of Lancaster's Regiment (King's, Lancashire and Border) (LANCS) is an infantry regiment of the line within the British Army, part of the Queen's Division. Headquartered in Preston, it recruits throughout the North West of England. The title of Duke of Lancaster merged with the Crown on the accession of Henry V in 1413 and remains dormant, subject to any future revival. Customarily, however, the Sovereign (whether male or female) is referred to as the Duke of Lancaster within Lancashire and in relation to the Duchy of Lancaster, and is the regiment's Colonel in Chief. The Duke of Lancaster's Regiment is the county regiment for Cumbria, Lancashire, Greater Manchester, Merseyside and the Isle of Man, and as such, recruits mainly from these areas.

== History ==
The regiment's formation was announced on 16 December 2004 by Geoff Hoon and General Sir Mike Jackson as part of the restructuring of the infantry, when it was initially to be known as the King's Lancashire and Border Regiment. The regiment was given its new name in November 2005. Initially formed of three regular army battalions, it was eventually reduced to two regular battalions, plus an Army Reserve battalion. The regiment was formed through the merger of three single battalion regiments:

- The King's Own Royal Border Regiment
- The King's Regiment
- The Queen's Lancashire Regiment

The regiment was formed on 1 July 2006. Initially, on formation, the regiment contained three regular battalions, with each battalion simply being renamed:

- 1st Battalion, Queen's Lancashire Regiment – 1st Battalion, The Duke of Lancaster's Regiment
- 1st Battalion, King's Regiment – 2nd Battalion, The Duke of Lancaster's Regiment
- 1st Battalion, King's Own Royal Border Regiment – 3rd Battalion, The Duke of Lancaster's Regiment

In March 2007, the 3rd Battalion was disbanded, with its personnel dispersed to the other two, leaving the final roll of two regular battalions and one Reserve battalion.

In 2012, a Kenyan mother and alleged prostitute called Agnes Wanjiru was allegedly murdered by soldiers of the Duke of Lancaster Regiment, with the murder reportedly covered up by British Army officials. The Sunday Times said a fellow soldier had gone to the “proper people” immediately after hearing a squaddie confess to the killing, but said he was told to “shut up” when he reported it and no action was taken. Ms Wanjiru's body was not discovered until two months later, after the regiment had returned to the UK. Defence Secretary Ben Wallace denied that the British military had covered-up Wanjiru's murder, but admitted guilt to and expressed concern over the Army hierarchy turning a "blind eye" to the use of prostitutes by personnel, especially within “countries in poverty”. In 2021, screenshots of a private Facebook group chat allegedly run by soldiers of the Duke of Lancaster's Regiment were published across British newspapers. The screenshots reportedly showed the regiment's soldiers joking and laughing at memes mocking the murder of Agnes Wanjiru. The leaking of the secret chats apparently mocking the murder sparked a reinvestigation into the case by Kenyan police. In 2022, UK armed forces introduced a ban on the use of sex workers abroad for the first time. Personnel found to have engaged in what the Ministry of Defence describes as “transactional sex” face the prospect of dismissal – and they could also be prosecuted if in countries where prostitution is illegal.

In December 2021, the regiment's 2nd Battalion re-subordinated to the Ranger Regiment, as its 3rd Battalion.

In 2021 a colour sergeant from 4th Battalion, the Duke of Lancaster's Regiment was fined and dismissed for lifting the skirt of a Kenyan woman, whom he knew, in a shopping mall in Nanyuki while intoxicated. A British Army spokesperson described the colour sergeant's conduct as disgraceful and said;

"This was appalling behaviour from the senior non-commissioned officer."

=== Deployments ===
Soldiers from the regiment's 4th Battalion have served alongside their regular army counterparts in Iraq, Afghanistan and Cyprus.

In recent years, deployments have included Denmark, Italy, Australia, Nigeria, South Sudan, Kenya, Lithuania, the Baltics, Poland, the Balkans and Georgia.

=== Sports ===
In May 2023, 4LANCS won the 2022-2023 Army Football Reserve Challenge Cup against 6SCOTS in a 2–1 victory at Aldershot. LANCS’ captain Cpl Kiel Brennan was awarded the Player of the Match.

Also in May, personnel from 1 LANCS took part in the IRONMAN70.3 Venice-Jesolo Triathlon. All five Triathletes from the 1 LANCS Triathlon club completed the 1.9 km Swim, 90 km Bike & 21 km Run course.

== Regimental structure ==
The regiment is split into a 1st and 4th Battalion, with the Regimental Headquarters located in Fulwood Barracks, Preston. The 1st Battalion is a light role infantry battalion based in Chester. The 4th Battalion is the regiment's reserve battalion and has its headquarters in Preston, with sub-units dispersed throughout its recruiting areas of Merseyside, Lancashire, Greater Manchester and Cumbria. Both battalions form part of the new 4th Light Brigade Combat Team, in the 1st (UK) Division.

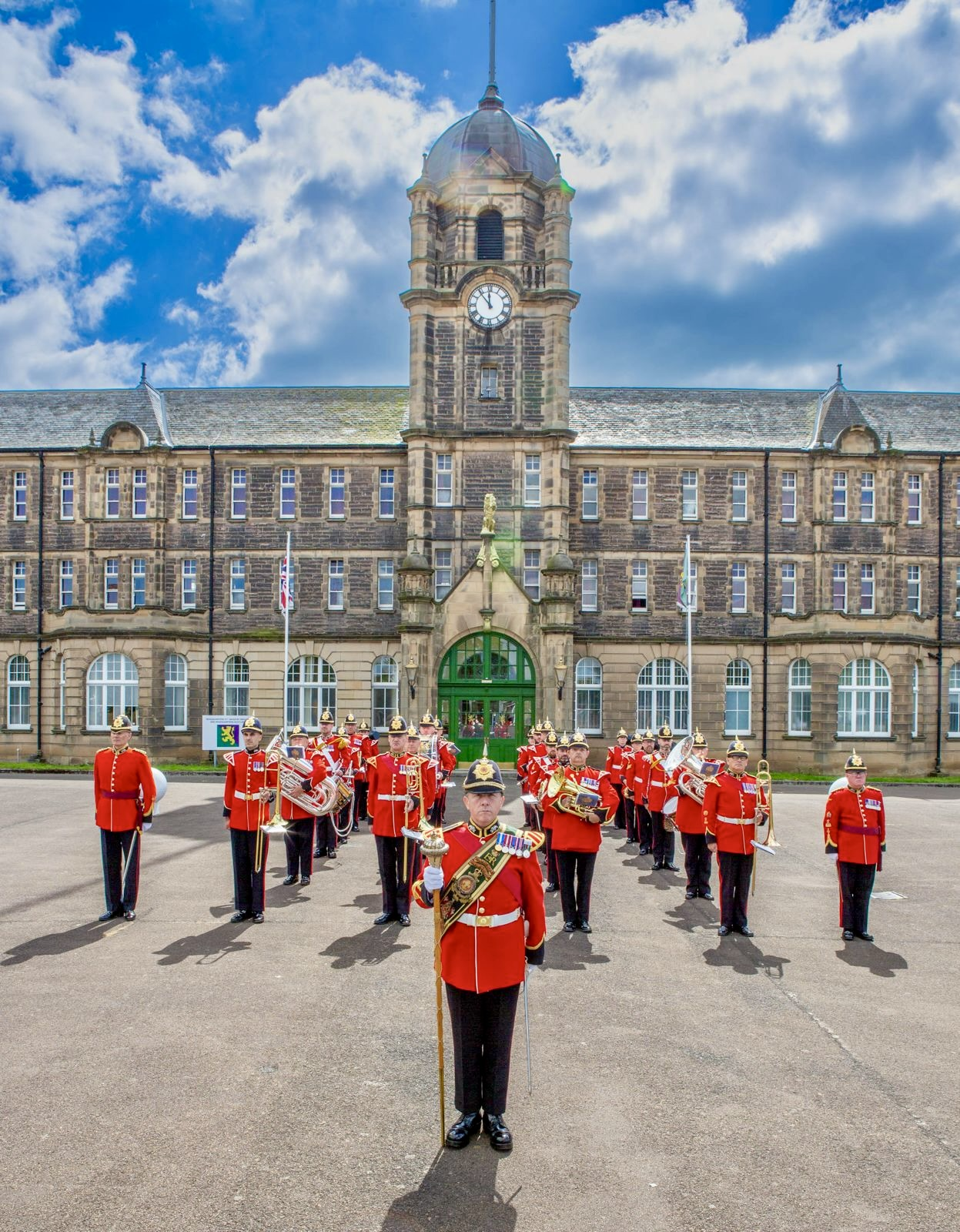
The Band of The Duke of Lancaster's Regiment with Director of Music (L), Drum Major (C) and Bandmaster (R)

== Regimental museum ==
There are five regimental museum collections based around the antecedent regiments:

- The King's Own Royal Regiment Museum is based within Lancaster City Museum.
- The King's Regiment collection is housed in the Museum of Liverpool.
  - The Liverpool Scottish Museum Archive is based in Liverpool city centre.
- The Lancashire Infantry Museum is based at Fulwood Barracks in Preston.
- Cumbria's Museum of Military Life is located in Carlisle Castle and accommodates the collections of the Border Regiment and the King's Own Royal Border Regiment
- The Museum of the Manchester Regiment is based in Ashton Town Hall.

== Battle honours ==
Infantry regiments are permitted to display 43 battle honours from the two world wars on the King's Colour and 46 honours from other conflicts on the Regimental Colour. Upon amalgamation, the Duke of Lancaster's Regiment had to choose from the total list of honours of its three antecedents which honours would be displayed on its new Colours. The chosen honours were:

King's Colour

- Mons; Retreat from Mons; Marne 1914, 18; Aisne 1914, 18; Messines 1914, 17, 18; Ypres 1914, 15, 17, 18; Neuve Chapelle; Loos; Somme 1916, 18; Arras 1917, 18; Scarpe 1917, 18; Cambrai 1917, 18; Lys; Hindenburg Line; Vittorio Veneto; Macedonia 1915–18; Sari Bair; Gallipoli 1915–16; Megiddo; Kut al Amara 1917; Baghdad; Kilimanjaro; Dunkirk; Normandy Landing; Falaise; Arnhem 1944; Lower Maas; Ourthe; Reichswald; Defence of Habbaniya; Tobruk 1941; Madagascar; Gueriat el Atach Ridge; Landing in Sicily; Anzio; Cassino II; Malta 1940–42; Singapore Island; Chindits 1943; North Arakan; Chindits 1944; Imphal; Kohima; Nyaungu Bridgehead; Burma 1943–45

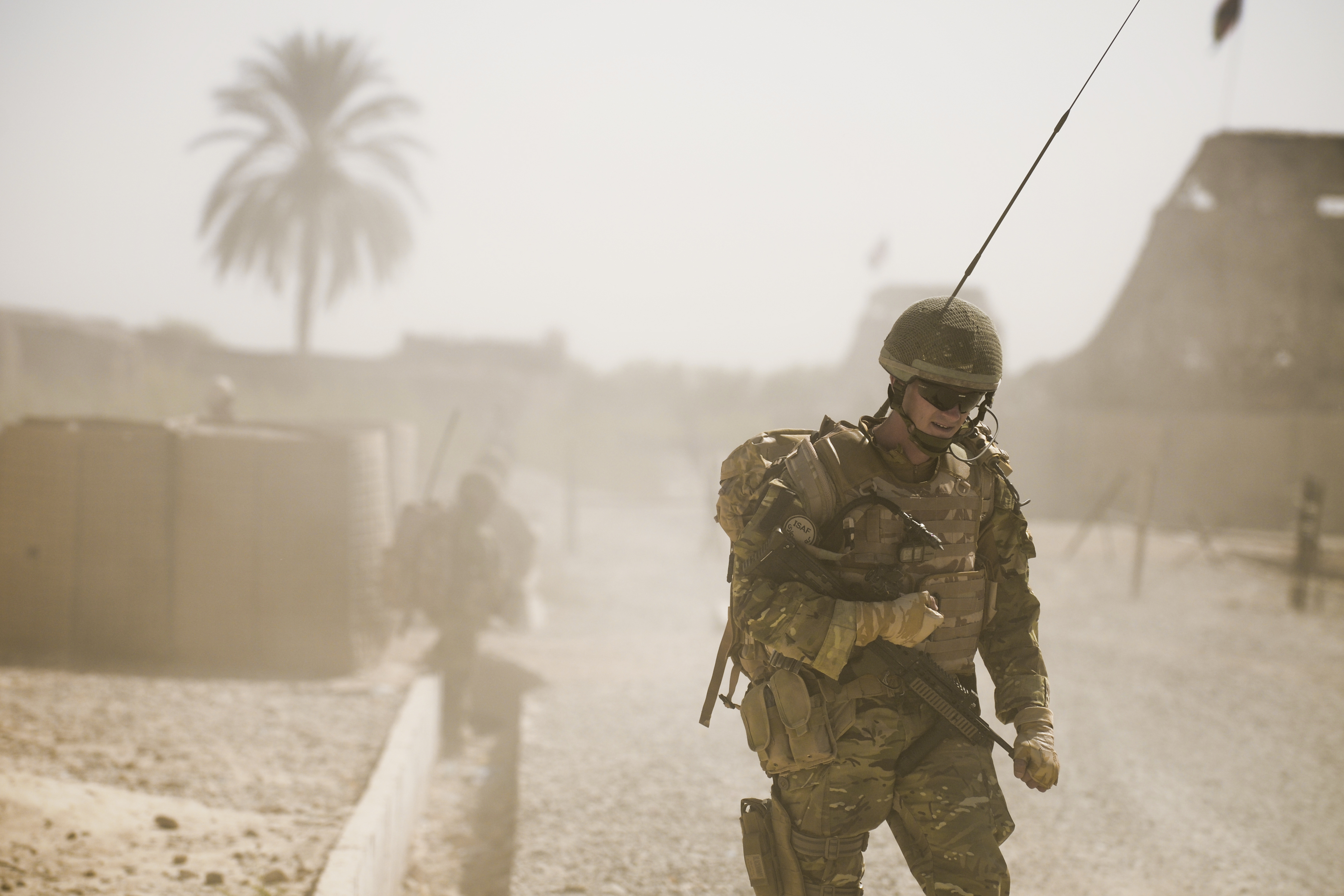
Soldiers from the 1st Battalion Duke of Lancaster's Regiment patrolling in Afghanistan in 2010

Regimental Colour

- Namur 1695; Gibraltar 1704–5; Blenheim; Ramillies; Oudenarde; Malplaquet; Dettingen; Louisburg; Guadeloupe 1759; Quebec 1759; Maida; Monte Video; Vimiera; Corunna; Arroyo dos Molinos; Tarifa; Badajoz; Salamanca; Vittoria; St Sebastian; Pyrenees; Nivelle; Nive; Guadeloupe 1810; Java; Bladensburg; Niagara; Waterloo; Bhurtpore; Candahar 1842; Cabool 1842; Maharajpore; New Zealand 1845–47; Alma; Inkerman; Sevastopol; Canton; Delhi 1857; Lucknow; New Zealand 1860–68; Abyssinia; Ahmad Khel; Afghanistan 1878–80; Defence of Kimberley; Defence of Ladysmith; Relief of Ladysmith; Afghanistan 1919; Korea 1952–53; The Hook 1953

In addition to the displayed honours, the Regimental Colour will also display four emblems from the antecedents regiments:

- Lion of England – displayed top left; from the King's Own Royal Border Regiment
- White Horse of Hanover – displayed top right; from the King's Regiment
- Red Rose charged with the Prince of Wales's feathers – displayed bottom left; from the Lancashire Regiment (Prince of Wales's Volunteers)
- Red Rose charged with the Royal Crest – displayed bottom right; from the Loyal Regiment (North Lancashire)

In addition, the Regimental Colour also features a Sphinx to distinguish the battle honour "Egypt" and a Dragon for the honour "China".

== Golden threads ==
The regiment has brought forward a number of Golden Threads from its antecedents, as displays of its history and heritage:

- Lion of England – the English Lion, facing inwards as worn by the King's Own Royal Regiment, has been adopted as the regiment's collar badge. The Lion of England is known as the regiment's "Ancient Badge" and provides inspiration for the regimental nickname – first adopted by the 2nd Battalion in August 2009 – "Lions of England". The lion is also used on the regiment's tactical recognition flash.
- Glider Flash – the glider awarded, 1949, as an honour to the Border Regiment, for glider landings in Sicily on 9 July 1943, is worn on the sleeve of No. 1 and No. 2 dress. The glider also formed the regiment's tactical recognition flash from its formation until 2014.
- Fleur-de-Lys – the fleur-de-lys worn by the King's Regiment is featured on the regiment's buttons.

=== Kingsman ===
Alongside a few other regiments in the British Army that use traditional names other than Private for the lowest rank, The Duke of Lancaster's Regiment uses the rank Kingsman (Kgn) instead of Private, a tradition inherited from the King's Regiment (itself having inherited the tradition from the King's Regiment (Liverpool)). Its use has been officially sanctioned since 1951, but it was informally used before this for over 100 years.

== Regimental Colonels ==
Regimental Colonels were as follows:

- 2006–2009: Major General Hamish Rollo
- 2009–2013: Brig. Michael Griffiths
- 2013–2018: Brig. Peter S. Rafferty, MBE
- 2018–2023: Brig. Frazer M. Lawrence
- 2023–present: Brig. Robert J. Singleton

== Lineage ==
1880	1881 Childers Reforms	1921 Name changes	1957 Defence White Paper	1966 Defence White Paper	1990 Options for Change	2003 Delivering Security in a Changing World
4th (King's Own Royal) Regiment of Foot	The King's Own (Royal Lancaster Regiment)	The King's Own Royal Regiment (Lancaster)	The King's Own Royal Border Regiment			The Duke of Lancaster's Regiment (King's, Lancashire and Border)
34th (Cumberland) Regiment of Foot	The Border Regiment		The King's Own Royal Border Regiment			The Duke of Lancaster's Regiment (King's, Lancashire and Border)
55th (Westmorland) Regiment of Foot	The Border Regiment		The King's Own Royal Border Regiment			The Duke of Lancaster's Regiment (King's, Lancashire and Border)
8th (The King's) Regiment of Foot	The King's (Liverpool Regiment)		King's Regiment (Liverpool and Manchester)			The Duke of Lancaster's Regiment (King's, Lancashire and Border)
63rd (West Suffolk) Regiment of Foot	The Manchester Regiment		King's Regiment (Liverpool and Manchester)			The Duke of Lancaster's Regiment (King's, Lancashire and Border)
96th Regiment of Foot	The Manchester Regiment		King's Regiment (Liverpool and Manchester)			The Duke of Lancaster's Regiment (King's, Lancashire and Border)
30th (Cambridgeshire) Regiment of Foot	The East Lancashire Regiment		The Lancashire Regiment (Prince of Wales's Volunteers)	The Queen's Lancashire Regiment		The Duke of Lancaster's Regiment (King's, Lancashire and Border)
59th (2nd Nottinghamshire) Regiment of Foot	The East Lancashire Regiment		The Lancashire Regiment (Prince of Wales's Volunteers)	The Queen's Lancashire Regiment		The Duke of Lancaster's Regiment (King's, Lancashire and Border)
40th (2nd Somersetshire) Regiment of Foot	The Prince of Wales's Volunteers (South Lancashire Regiment) renamed in 1938: The South Lancashire Regiment (The Prince of Wales's Volunteers)		The Lancashire Regiment (Prince of Wales's Volunteers)	The Queen's Lancashire Regiment		The Duke of Lancaster's Regiment (King's, Lancashire and Border)
82nd (Prince of Wales's Volunteers) Regiment of Foot	The Prince of Wales's Volunteers (South Lancashire Regiment) renamed in 1938: The South Lancashire Regiment (The Prince of Wales's Volunteers)		The Lancashire Regiment (Prince of Wales's Volunteers)	The Queen's Lancashire Regiment		The Duke of Lancaster's Regiment (King's, Lancashire and Border)
47th (Lancashire) Regiment of Foot	The Loyal North Lancashire Regiment	The Loyal Regiment (North Lancashire)		The Queen's Lancashire Regiment		The Duke of Lancaster's Regiment (King's, Lancashire and Border)
81st (Loyal Lincoln Volunteers) Regiment of Foot	The Loyal North Lancashire Regiment	The Loyal Regiment (North Lancashire)		The Queen's Lancashire Regiment		The Duke of Lancaster's Regiment (King's, Lancashire and Border)

== Alliances ==
Alliances formed by the regiment are as follows:

- Canada – The Royal Regiment of Canada
- Canada – The Loyal Edmonton Regiment (4th Battalion, Princess Patricia's Canadian Light Infantry)
- Canada – The West Nova Scotia Regiment
- Canada – The Princess of Wales' Own Regiment
- Australia – The Royal Queensland Regiment
- Australia – The Royal South Australia Regiment
- Australia – The Royal Tasmania Regiment
- New Zealand – The Otago and Southland Regiment
- New Zealand – The Wellington (City of Wellington's Own) and Hawke's Bay Regiment
- India – 5th Battalion, The Sikh Regiment
- Pakistan – 8th and 14th Battalions, The Punjab Regiment
- Pakistan – 1st and 15th Battalions, The Frontier Force Regiment
- Malaysia – 2nd Battalion, The Royal Malay Regiment
- South Africa – The Kimberley Regiment
- Royal Navy – HMS Triumph
- Royal Navy – HMS Lancaster

== Freedoms ==
The regiment have received the Freedom of several locations throughout its history; these include:

- (England) 1 July 2006: Pendle (Originally Granted to an antecedent regiment The Queen's Lancashire Regiment in 2001).
- (England) 2006: Haslingden
- (England) 2006: Warrington
- (England) 2007: Chorley
- (England) 17 April 2007: Tameside
- (England) 14 September 2008: Liverpool.
- (England) 12 October 2009: Knowsley
- (England) 16 April 2010: Manchester
- (England) 10 March 2011: Ribble Valley
- (England) 22 October 2011: West Lancashire
- (England) 20 May 2013: Whitehaven
- (England) 2013: Burnley
- (England) 20 May 2015: Maryport
- (England) 20 June 2017: Sefton
- (England) 18 July 2017: Appleby-in-Westmorland
- (England) July 2017: Blackpool
- (England) 2 December 2019: Wigan
- (England) 24 May 2022: Wyre
- (England) 25 April 2026: South Ribble

== Order of precedence ==
Preceded by Princess of Wales's Royal Regiment	Infantry Order of Precedence	Succeeded by Royal Regiment of Fusiliers
