= John Thomas Davies =

English soldier (1895–1955)

John Thomas Davies VC
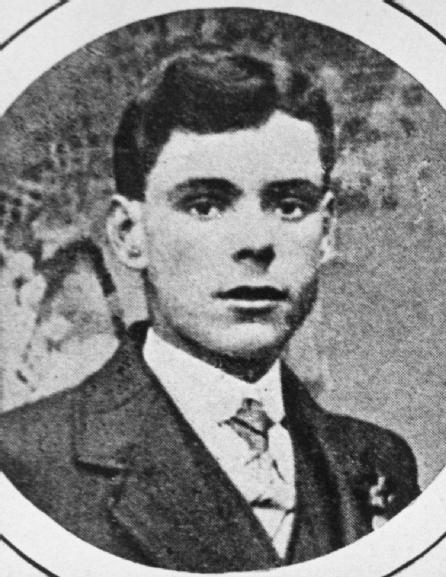
- Born: 29 September 1895; Rock Ferry, Birkenhead, Cheshire, England
- Died: 28 October 1955 (aged 60); St. Helens, Lancashire, England
- Burial place: St Helens Borough Cemetery
- Military career
- Branch: British Army
- Service number: 20765
- Units: South Lancashire Regiment; Home Guard
- Conflicts: World War I World War II
- Awards: Victoria Cross

John Thomas Davies VC (29 September 1895 – 28 October 1955) was an English soldier and recipient of the Victoria Cross, the highest and most prestigious award for gallantry in the face of the enemy that was awarded in the British Empire, and to this day in the United Kingdom and Commonwealth.

He was 22 years old and a corporal in the 11th (Service) Battalion, South Lancashire Regiment (The Prince of Wales's Volunteers), British Army during the First World War when the following deed took place for which he was awarded the VC.

On 24 March 1918 near Eppeville, France, when his company was ordered to withdraw, Corporal Davies knew that the only line of withdrawal lay through a deep stream lined with a belt of barbed wire; he saw it imperative to hold up the enemy as long as possible. He mounted the parapet in full view of the enemy in order to get a more effective field of fire and kept his Lewis gun in action to the last, causing many enemy casualties and enabling part of his company to get across the river, which they would otherwise have been unable to do.

He was taken prisoner after the action. During World War II, he was a captain in the Home Guard. He was buried in St. Helens Borough Cemetery, Lancashire, England. (C. of E. Section. Area 59. Grave 426.)

== The Medal ==
His Victoria Cross is displayed at the Imperial War Museum, London, England.

== Bibliography ==
- Gliddon, Gerald (2013) [2004]. Spring Offensive 1918. VCs of the First World War. The History Press. ISBN 978-0-7524-8730-4.
