= Lancashire Regiment =

- Active: 1 July 1958 – 25 March 1970
- Country: United Kingdom
- Branch: British Army
- Type: Line infantry
- Size: One regular battalion Two territorial battalions
- Part of: Lancastrian Brigade King's Division
- Engagements: Aden Emergency

The Lancashire Regiment (Prince of Wales's Volunteers) was an infantry regiment of the British Army that had a very short existence.

== History ==
The regiment was formed, as a consequence of defence cuts instigated by the 1957 Defence White Paper, by the amalgamation of the 1st Battalion, East Lancashire Regiment and the 1st Battalion, South Lancashire Regiment (The Prince of Wales's Volunteers) on 1 July 1958.

The regiment was first based in Hong Kong where both of its predecessor regiments had been based when they amalgamated. In 1961 the regiment arrived in Hilden, West Germany as part of the British Army of the Rhine. Shortly after Swaziland's first-ever elections in 1964, the regiment arrived there to maintain order. The regiment remained in that country until early the following year when it returned to Britain, being based in Catterick.

In 1967 the Lancashires arrived in Aden in the Middle East a number of months before Aden gained independence from the British Empire. In 1968 the regiment was posted to the garrison in Malta. The following year the Lancashires again returned home to the United Kingdom.

On 25 March 1970, after a relatively brief existence, the regiment was amalgamated with the 1st Battalion, Loyal Regiment (North Lancashire), to form the 1st Battalion, Queen's Lancashire Regiment.

== Regimental museum ==
The Lancashire Infantry Museum is based at Fulwood Barracks in Preston.

== Alliances ==
Alliances were as follows:

- Canada The Princess of Wales' Own Regiment (1958-1970)
- Canada The West Nova Scotia Regiment (1958-1970)
- Australia 40th Infantry Battalion (The Derwent Regiment) (1958-1960)
- Australia The Royal Tasmania Regiment (1967-1970)
- New Zealand The Hawke's Bay Regiment
- Pakistan 8th Battalion, The Punjab Regiment
