= William Young (VC) =

Scottish Victoria Cross recipient (1876–1916)

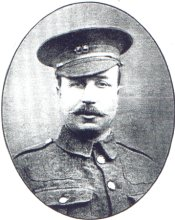
- Born: 1 January 1876; Glasgow, Scotland
- Died: 27 August 1916 (aged 40); Cambridge Hospital, Aldershot
- Burial place: Lancashire
- Military career
- Allegiance: United Kingdom
- Branch: British Army
- Service years: 1914 - 1916
- Rank: Private
- Units: The East Lancashire Regiment
- Conflicts: World War I
- Awards: Victoria Cross

William Young VC (1 January 1876 – 27 August 1916) was a Scottish recipient of the Victoria Cross, the highest and most prestigious award for gallantry in the face of the enemy that can be awarded to British and Commonwealth forces.

== Details ==
He was 39 years old, and a private in the 8th (S) Battalion, The East Lancashire Regiment, British Army during the First World War when the following deed took place for which he was awarded the VC.

On 22 December 1915, east of Foncquevillers, France, Private Young saw from his trench that one of his company's NCOs was lying wounded in front of the wire. Acting without orders and heedless of his exposure to enemy fire, he climbed over the parapet and went to the rescue of his sergeant. He was hit by two bullets, one shattered his jaw and the other entered his chest. Undeterred, he went on and, with another soldier who came to assist, brought the wounded sergeant back to safety. Later Private Young walked back to the village dressing station to have his injuries attended to. He spent the next four months in the hospital, but died in August 1916 when undergoing surgery.

== The medal ==
His Victoria Cross is displayed in the Lancashire at War exhibition at The Museum of Lancashire in Preston, Lancashire, England.

== Bibliography ==
- Batchelor, Peter; Matson, Christopher (2011). The Western Front 1915. VCs of the First World War. Stroud, Gloucestershire: The History Press. ISBN 978-0-7524-6057-4.
- Buzzell, Nora, ed. (1997). The Register of the Victoria Cross. Cheltenham, Gloucestershire: This England Alma House. ISBN 0-906324-27-0.
- Harvey, David (2000). Monuments to Courage. Naval & Military Press Ltd. ISBN 1-84342-356-1.
- Kirby, Henry L. (1985). Private William Young, V.C.: One of Preston's Heroes of the Great War: East Lancashire Regiment 1914-1918. THCL Books. ISBN 978-0948494000.
- Ross, Graham (1995). Scotland's Forgotten Valour. MacLean Press. ISBN 978-1899272006.
