= Spencer Bent =

English Victoria Cross recipient (1891-1977)

Spencer John Bent
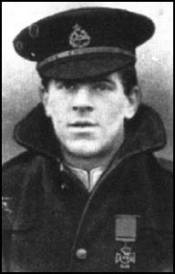
- Born: 18 March 1891; Stowmarket, Suffolk, England
- Died: 3 May 1977 (aged 86); Hackney, London, England
- Burial place: West Norwood Crematorium
- Military career
- Allegiance: United Kingdom
- Branch: British Army
- Service years: 1905 – 1925
- Rank: Regimental Sergeant-Major
- Units: The East Lancashire Regiment
- Conflicts: World War I
- Awards: Victoria Cross; Military Medal
- Other work: School caretaker

Spencer John Bent, VC, MM (known as "Joe") (18 March 1891 – 3 May 1977) was an English recipient of the Victoria Cross, the highest and most prestigious award for gallantry in the face of the enemy that can be awarded to British and Commonwealth forces.

== Biography ==
He was 23 years old, and a drummer in the 1st Battalion, The East Lancashire Regiment, British Army during the First World War when the following deed took place for which he was awarded the VC.

On the night of 1–2 November 1914, near Le Gheer, Belgium, when his officer, the platoon sergeant and a number of men had been struck down, Drummer Bent took command of the platoon and with great presence of mind and coolness succeeded in holding the position. He had previously distinguished himself on two occasions, on 22 and 24 October by bringing up ammunition under heavy shell and rifle fire. Again, on 3 November, he brought into cover some wounded men who were lying, exposed to enemy fire, in the open.

Bent was a Freemason and was initiated into Aldershot Camp Lodge No. 1331 on 8 December 1920.

He later achieved the rank of Company Sergeant-Major. He survived the war and died on 3 May 1977. Bent was cremated at West Norwood Cemetery, London.

Bent's VC, along with his Military Medal and Russian Cross of St. George was sold at auction in June 2000 for £80,000. His VC is on display in the Lord Ashcroft Gallery at the Imperial War Museum, London.
