= Lancashire Infantry Museum =

Military museum in Preston, Lancashire, England

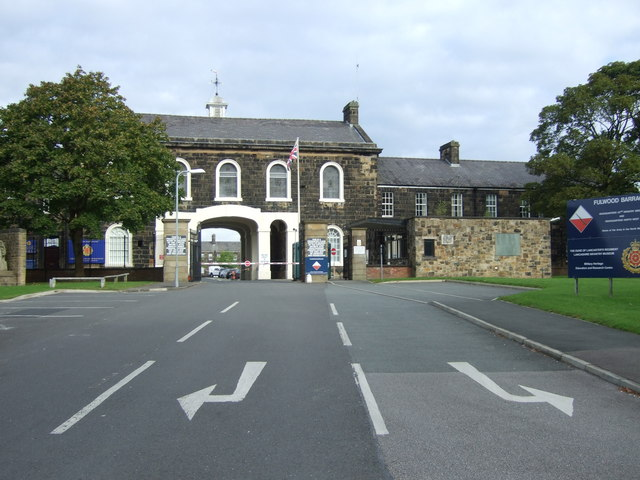
- The entrance to the museum is the door shown on the left of the main archway

- Shown in Lancashire
- Established: 1929; 97 years ago
- Location: Fulwood Barracks, Preston, Lancashire
- Coordinates: 53.778271°N 2.686240°W
- Website: www.lancashireinfantrymuseum.org.uk

The Lancashire Infantry Museum, formerly known as the Queen's Lancashire Regiment Museum, is located at Fulwood Barracks in Preston, Lancashire, England. The museum claims to be "largest Regimental archive and the premier centre for military historical research in the North of England."

== History ==
The museum was founded as the museum of the Loyal Regiment (North Lancashire) in 1929. It chronicles the men of Lancashire who fought for their country during the wars. It also acts as an archive of battles fought by the Duke of Lancaster's Regiment and its antecedent regiments, including the Queen's Lancashire Regiment, the East Lancashire Regiment, the South Lancashire Regiment, the Loyal Regiment (North Lancashire) and the Lancashire Regiment (Prince of Wales's Volunteers). In all, the museum's collections cover 120 separate units, including the 59 battalions formed by the antecedent Lancashire regiments during the First World War, and all associated Militia, Rifle Volunteers, Territorials, Home Guard and Cadet units.

An important exhibit is the French Imperial Eagle of the 22nd Line Infantry Regiment captured by the Anglo-Portuguese Army on 22 July 1812 at the Battle of Salamanca. In spite of claims that the eagle was captured by Ensign John Pratt of the 2/30th Regiment of Foot's light company, it was actually captured by Portuguese troops of the 12 Caçadores Battalion. The museum also displays items from its collections in other area museums, including the Museum of Lancashire, Blackburn Museum and Art Gallery, Towneley Hall and Warrington Museum & Art Gallery.
