= William Spencer Bagdatopoulos =

American painter

- Born: July 23, 1888; Greece
- Died: 1965
- Other name: W. S. Bylityilis
- Known for: Painting and printmaking

William Spencer Bagdatopoulos (1888–1965), also known as W. S. Bylityilis, was a painter and commercial artist, and a Fellow of the Royal Society of Arts. He is known for his Orientalist renditions of people and monuments in the East.

== Early life ==
Born of mixed Greek-English parentage on the island of Zante, Greece, in 1888, he spent his childhood in the Netherlands. He entered the Academie van Beeldende Kunsten, Rotterdam (the Rotterdam Art Academy) at age 11. At the age of sixteen he travelled to what was then called the Near East, painting in Egypt and Palestine, and going on to study art for another year at the Athens Academy (1906–07). He traveled and worked in Turkey, Egypt, Palestine, returning to London in 1908 at the age of 20, where he studied and started working as an artist, painting commissions for portraits, illustrations, murals, and posters for business houses, shipping companies, and the railways. He was elected a member of the Royal Society of Arts, England in 1909, and was a medalist at the National Competition of 1913 in South Kensington. The following year, he served with the British Army during World War I.

== Work in India ==
In 1924, Bagdatopoulos was commissioned by the Times of India in Bombay to tour the country on their behalf. From 1924-26 he travelled to every part of India, painting images of Indian sights, such as the Golden Temple, the gopuram at Madurai, the Taj Mahal, and the bazaars of Darjeeling. Some of his art was reproduced in the Times of India annuals. He also illustrated advertisements for the magazine and travel posters for the Indian Railways Promotion Bureau. A biographical note in the Who's Who on the Pacific Coast describes him as 'Chief artist and pictorial advisor to Times of India mag.; recognized as an authority on far and near eastern advt'.

== Work in U.S.A. ==
In 1928, Bagdatopoulos moved to the USA, becoming a naturalized U. S. citizen. He settled in Santa Barbara, California in 1932 working as an artist, chiefly painting portraits. He also seems to have worked as a set designer for stage and film, since his entry in Who's who in California: a biographical directory, 1928-29 asserts that Bagdatopoulos 'as Designer of Sets, is always inventing and creating new novelness'. He turned later in his career to 'the more demanding discipline of printmaking, producing a considerable body of works in both etching and drypoint'.
