= Canterbury Street drill hall =

Former military installation in Lancashire, England

- Blackburn
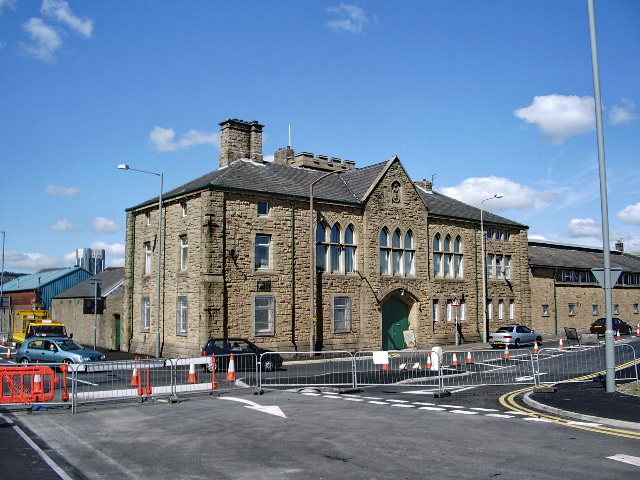
- Canterbury Street drill hall

Site information
- Type: Drill hall

Location
- Location in Lancashire
- Coordinates: 53.74425°N 2.48440°W

Site history
- Built: 1870
- Built for: War Office
- Architect: Stevens and Robinson
- In use: 1870 – 2010

The Canterbury Street drill hall is a former military installation in Blackburn, Lancashire. It is a Grade II listed building.

== History ==
The building was designed by Stevens and Robinson as the headquarters of the 2nd Lancashire Rifle Volunteer Corps and was completed by Richard Hacking, a local builder, in 1870. The unit evolved to become the 1st Volunteer Battalion, The East Lancashire Regiment in 1889 and 4th Battalion, The East Lancashire Regiment in 1908. The battalion was mobilised at the drill hall in August 1914 before being deployed to Gallipoli and ultimately to the Western Front. The Battalion amalgamated with the 5th Battalion to form the 4th/5th Battalion at the Canterbury Street drill hall in 1921 but the 4th Battalion was reformed there again in 1939 just before the Second World War.

Following a re-organisation, the battalion converted to become the 93 (East Lancashire) Signal Squadron, 38 Signal Regiment (Volunteers) in 1971. The squadron was disbanded in March 2010.
