= Queen's Lancashire Regiment =

The Queen's Lancashire Regiment
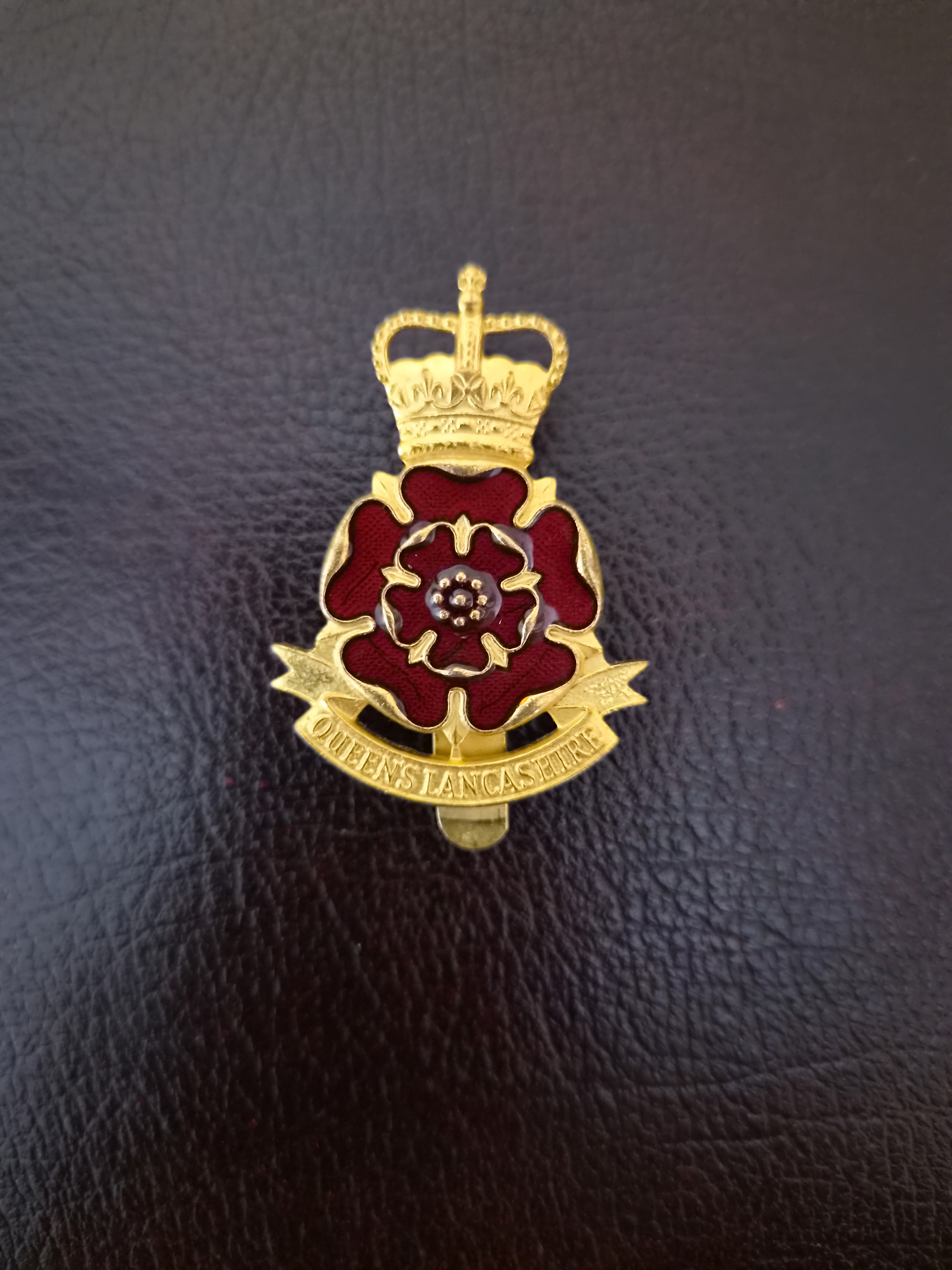
- Cap badge of The Queen's Lancashire Regiment
- Active: 1970–2006
- Allegiance: United Kingdom
- Branch: British Army
- Type: Line Infantry
- Role: 1st Battalion – Mechanised; 4th Battalion – TA Reserve
- Size: One battalion
- Part of: King's Division
- Garrison/HQ: RHQ – Fulwood Barracks, Preston; 1st Battalion – Osnabrück, Germany
- Motto: Loyally I Serve
- March: Quick – L'Attaque/The Red Rose; Slow – Long Live Elizabeth
- Anniversaries: Waterloo(18 June); Quebec(13 September)

Insignia
- Tactical Recognition Flash

The Queen's Lancashire Regiment (30th, 40th, 47th, 59th, 81st and 82nd Regiments of Foot) (QLR) was an infantry regiment of the British Army, part of the King's Division. It was formed on 25 March 1970 at Connaught Barracks in Dover through the amalgamation of the two remaining Lancashire infantry regiments, the Lancashire Regiment (Prince of Wales's Volunteers) and the Loyal Regiment (North Lancashire). In July 2006 the regiment was amalgamated with two other Northern infantry regiments to form the Duke of Lancaster's Regiment.

== History ==
The 1st Battalion served on operations in Northern Ireland in 1970, 1971–72, 1972–73, 1975–76 (resident), 1977, 1980–81, 1987, 1990–92, 1997–99 (resident) and 2001.

The 1st Battalion undertook two tours with BAOR in the mechanised role. The first of which was with 12 Mechanised Brigade in Osnabrück from 1970 to 1974. The second was with 33 Armoured Brigade in Paderborn from 1984 to 1990. The 1st Battalion also had the honour of being the last British battalion to serve in Berlin prior to the final withdrawal in 1994.

Overseas service saw the 1st Battalion posted to Cyprus from 1978 to 1980 as the Western Sovereign Base Area Resident Battalion, and again in 1983, where they saw service with the United Nations. A company was dispatched to the Falkland Islands in the aftermath of the 1982 war. The 1st Battalion returned to Cyprus as the Eastern Sovereign Base Area Resident Battalion from 2004 to 2005.

In 1996 the 1st Battalion served as part of IFOR in Bosnia operating in the area known as "The Anvil".

The regiment's 1st Battalion saw service in Iraq in the months immediately following Operation Telic, from June to November 2003. Given responsibility for Iraq's second city, Basra, it gained much praise for its efforts to restore security and civil order.

On 16 December 2004, it was announced that the Queen's Lancashire Regiment would be merged with the King's Regiment and the King's Own Royal Border Regiment into the Duke of Lancaster's Regiment (King's Lancashire and Border). On 1 July 2006, the 1st Battalion, Queen's Lancashire Regiment became the 1st Battalion, Duke of Lancaster's Regiment.

== Territorials ==
As well as the regular 1st Battalion, the regiment also had a Territorial Army 4th Battalion, which was formed on 1 April 1975, with headquarters at Kimberley Barracks, Preston and companies at various times in Ashton-under-Lyne, Blackburn, Blackpool, Bolton, Burnley and Bury. As part of the Strategic Defence Review, the 4th Battalion merged with the 4th Battalion the King's Own Royal Border Regiment to create the Lancastrian and Cumbrian Volunteers in July 1999.

== Abuses in Iraq ==
Some months after returning from Iraq the battalion was at the centre of the first serious accusations of abuse against Iraqi prisoners levelled at British soldiers. These accusations were illustrated on the front pages of the Daily Mirror by photographs which the regiment immediately denounced as staged fakes. The regiment then ran a successful campaign, believed to be unique for an active unit of the British Armed Forces, to prove that the pictures were false. After two weeks, the Mirror was forced to admit that it had found "sufficient evidence to suggest that these pictures are fakes and that the Daily Mirror has been the subject of a calculated and malicious hoax." Editor Piers Morgan was forced to resign when he refused to apologise.

There has however been at least one case of true abuse; Corporal Donald Payne became Britain's first convicted war criminal after pleading guilty to abusing Iraqi detainees, which resulted in the death of one detainee Baha Mousa. Six other soldiers were cleared of any wrongdoing. The presiding judge, Mr Justice McKinnon, stated that "none of those soldiers has been charged with any offence, simply because there is no evidence against them as a result of a more or less obvious closing of ranks." The report from a 2011 inquiry into the killing stated that 19 soldiers had assaulted Mousa and nine other Iraqi detainees and that many other soldiers, including officers, must have known what was happening.

On 19 July 2005, Attorney General Lord Goldsmith announced that Payne was being charged with manslaughter, perverting the course of justice and inhumane treatment of persons under the International Criminal Court Act 2001. On the same day, another ten soldiers were also charged with similar crimes, six relating to the death of Mousa and four relating to the death of another Iraqi, Ahmed Jabber Kareem Ali, on 8 May 2003.

The court martial was held in Bulford Camp, Wiltshire, after an investigation by the Royal Military Police. It convened in the autumn of 2006, and concluded six months later in April 2007, being the most expensive Court Martial in modern British military history

During the court martial, Corporal Payne admitted he "enjoyed" hearing Iraqis call out during torture, describing their cries of pain as "the choir". He was cleared of manslaughter and perverting the course of justice. Six other soldiers were cleared of any charges.

After earlier pleading guilty to the offence of inhuman treatment of persons protected under the Geneva Conventions, Corporal Donald Payne was sentenced to 12 months imprisonment, reduced to the ranks, and dismissed from Her Majesty's Armed Forces, on 30 April 2007.

== Regimental museum ==
The Lancashire Infantry Museum is based at Fulwood Barracks in Preston.

== Battle honours ==
The Queen's Lancashire Regiment's battle honours were as follows:

- Pre-War:
  - Gibraltar 1704–5, Louisberg, Quebec 1759, Belleisle, Martinique 1762, Havannah, St Lucia 1778, Cape of Good Hope 1806, Maida, Monte Video, Rolica. Vimiera, Corunna, Talavera, Java, Tarifa, Badajoz, Salamanca, Vittoria, St Sebastian, Pyrenees, Nivelle, Nive, Orthes, Toulouse, Peninsula, Niagara, Waterloo, Ava, Bhurtpore, Candahar 1842, Ghuznee 1842, Cabool 1842, Maharajpore, Alma, Inkerman, Sevastopol, Lucknow, Canton, New Zealand, Ali Masjib, Ahmed Khel, Afghanistan 1878–80, Chitral, Siege of Kimberley, Relief of Ladysmith, South Africa 1899–02.
- The Great War 1914–18:
  - Mons, Le Cateau, Retreat from Mons, Marne 1914, 18, Aisne 1914, 18, La Basse 1914, Messines 1914, 17, 18, Armentieres 1914, Ypres 1914, 15, 17, 18, Langemarck 1914, 17, Gheluvelt, Nonne Boschen, Givenchy 1914, Neuve Chapelle, St Julien, Frezenberg, Bellewaarde, Aubers, Festubert 1915, Loos, Somme 1916, 18, Albert 1916, 18, Bazentin, Pozieres, Guillemont, Ginchy, Flers-Courcelette, Morval, Le Transloy, Ancre Heights, Ancre 1916, 18, Arras 1917, 18, Vimy 1917, Scarpe 1917, 18, Arleux. Oppy, Pilckem, Menin Road, Polygon Wood Broodseinde, Poelcappelle, Passchendaele, Cambrai 1917, 18, St Quentin, Bapaume 1918, Rosieres, Villers-Bretonneux, Lys, Estaires, Hazebrouck, Bailleul, Kemmel, Bethune, Scherpenberg, Soissonnais-Ourcq, Drocourt-Queant, Hindenburg Line, Epehy, Canal du Nord, St Quentin Canal, Courtrai, Selle, Valenciennes, Sambre, France and Flanders 1914–18, Kosturino, Doiran 1917, 18, Macedonia 1915–18, Helles, Krithia, Suvla, Sari Bair, Gallipoli 1915, Rumani, Egypt 1915–17, Battle of Gaza, Nebi Samwil, Battle of Jerusalem, Jaffa, Tell'Asur. Palestine 1917-18, Tigris 1916, Kut al Amara 1917, Baghdad, Mesopotamia 1916–18, Kilimanjaro, East Africa 1914–16.
- Inter-War:
  - Baluchistan 1918. Afghanistan 1919.
- The Second World War 1939–45:
  - Defence of Escaut, Dunkirk 1940, Normandy Landing, Odon, Caen, Bourgebus Ridge, Troarn, Falaise, Nederrijn, Lower Maas, Venraij, Ourthe, Rhineland, Reichswald, Weeze, Hochwald, Rhine, Ibbenburen, Aller, Bremen, North-West Europe 1940, 44–45, Banana Ridge, Djebel Kess Kiss, Medjez Plain, Gueriat El Atach Ridge, Gab Gab Gap, Djebel Bou Aoukaz 1943, North Africa 1943, Anzio, Rome, Fiesole, Gothic Line, Monte Gameraldi, Monte Ceco, Monte Grand, Italy 1944–45, Madagascar, Middle East 1942, Johore, Batu Pahat, Singapore Island, Malaya 1941–42, North Arakan, Mayu Tunnels, Pinwe, Meiktila, Nyaungu Bridgehead, Letse, Irrawaddy, Burma 1943–45.

== Colonel-in-Chief ==
The Colonel-in-Chief of the regiment was Queen Elizabeth II

== Regimental Colonels ==
Colonels of the regiment have been:

- 1970–1978 Maj-Gen. Hon. Miles Francis Fitzalan Howard, KCVO, CB, CBE, MC
- 1978–1983 Maj-Gen. Peter Aldcroft Downward, CB, DSO, DFC
- 1983–1993 Maj-Gen. David Houston, CBE
- 1993–1999 Lt-Gen. Scott Carnegie Grant, CB
- 1999–2001 Brig. Alex Frederick Birtwistle, OBE, ADC
- 2001–2006 Brig. Geoffrey Paul Sheldon
- 2006 The regiment was amalgamated with The King's Own Royal Border Regiment and The King's Regiment to form The Duke of Lancaster's Regiment (King's, Lancashire and Border)

== Alliances ==
- Canada – The Princess of Wales' Own Regiment
- Canada – The West Nova Scotia Regiment
- Canada – The Loyal Edmonton Regiment (4th Battalion, Princess Patricia's Canadian Light Infantry)
- Australia – The Royal Tasmania Regiment
- New Zealand – The Wellington (City of Wellington's Own) and Hawke's Bay Regiment
- Pakistan – 8th and 14th Battalions, The Punjab Regiment
- Malaysia – 2nd Battalion, The Royal Malay Regiment
- South Africa – The Kimberley Regiment
- Royal Navy – HMS Lancaster

== Freedom Towns ==
- Germany – Spandau (16 August 1993)
- United Kingdom – Blackburn
- United Kingdom – Burnley
- United Kingdom – Fylde
- United Kingdom – Hyndburn (29 June 2002).
- United Kingdom – Pendle (2001).
- United Kingdom – Preston
- United Kingdom – Rossendale (Haslingden)
- United Kingdom – Warrington
- United Kingdom – Chorley

== See also ==
- Lancashire Infantry Museum
