= King's Own Royal Border Regiment =

Military Unit

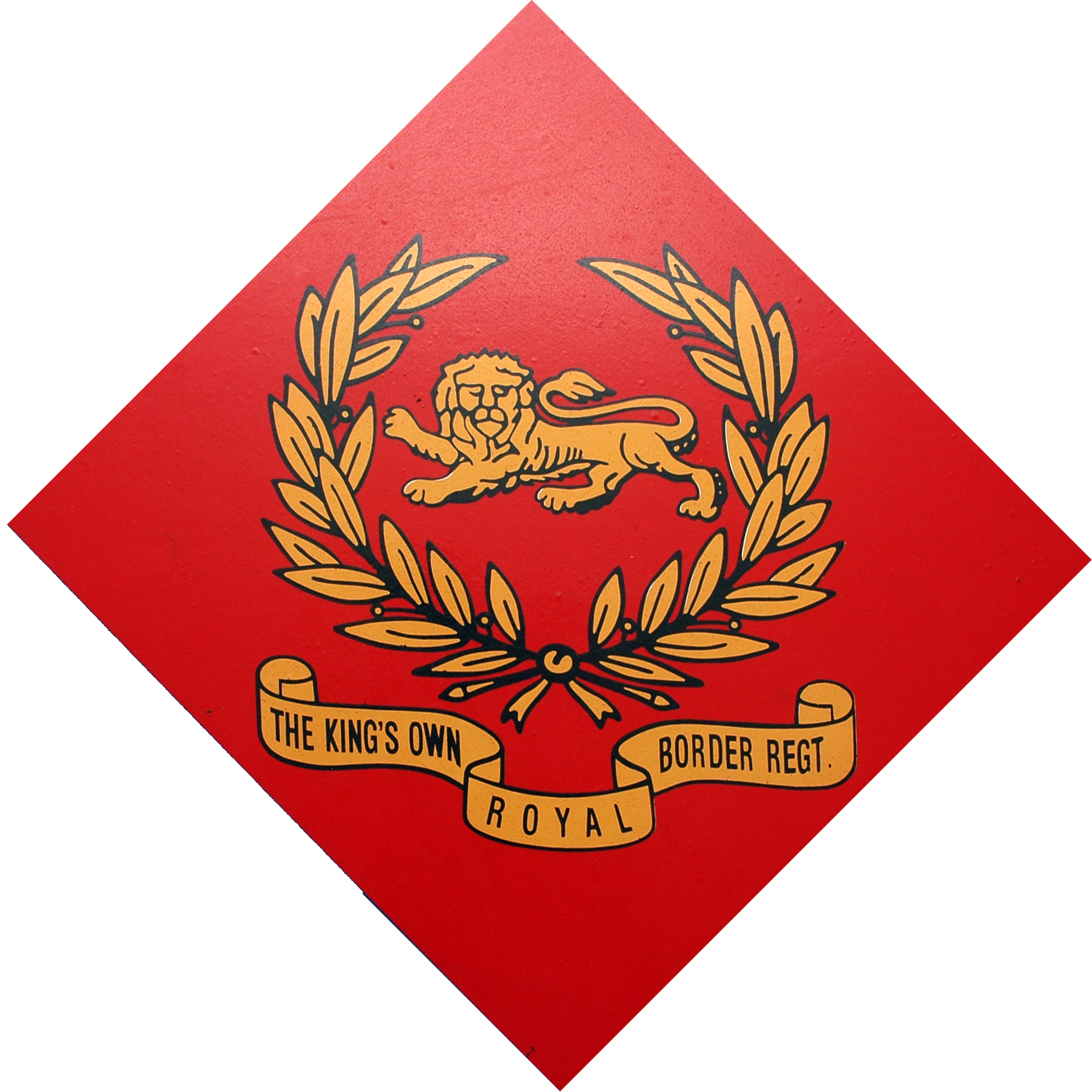
- Cap badge
- Active: 1959–2006
- Country: United Kingdom
- Branch: British Army
- Type: Infantry
- Role: Line infantry
- Part of: King's Division
- Garrison/HQ: Regimental Headquarters, Carlisle Castle
- Mottos: Tried and Valiant, for Duty not Display
- March: De ye ken John Peel
- Anniversaries: 28 October Arroyo Day Commemorates an action in Spain when the 34th Foot captured the Drums of their French opposite numbers.

Insignia
- Tactical Recognition Flash
- Arm Badge: Glider; From Border Regiment

The King's Own Royal Border Regiment was an infantry regiment of the British Army in existence from 1959 until 2006, and was part of the King's Division. It was formed at Barnard Castle on 1 October 1959 through the amalgamation of the King's Own Royal Regiment (Lancaster) and the Border Regiment.

== History ==
The regiment's earliest forebears were the 4th, or Kings Own Regiment of Foot, formed 13 July 1680 as the 2nd Tangier Regiment, also known as 'Charles Earl of Plymouth's Regiment of Foot for Tangiers', being the fourth regiment of foot in seniority in the British Army.

The 34th (Cumberland) and 55th (Westmorland) Regiments of Foot were formed later in 1705 and 1755, respectively. In 1881 they amalgamated to form the Border Regiment.

The 1 October 1959 amalgamated regiment preserved traditions of the previous three regiments (4th, 34th and 55th). Every 28 October, the regiment would celebrate "Arroyo Day" by parading the French drums and French drum major's mace captured during the Peninsular War in 1811. They had been taken intact in the Battle of Arroyo dos Molinos from the French 34e Régiment de Ligne on 28 October 1811.

The regiment saw a great deal of service in Northern Ireland during the troubles. The regiment was twice awarded the Wilkinson Sword of Peace for work in both Derry and Bosnia.

In 2004, as part of the restructuring of the infantry, it was announced that the King's Own Royal Border Regiment would amalgamate with the King's Regiment and the Queen's Lancashire Regiment to form the new Duke of Lancaster's Regiment (King's Lancashire and Border). The Regiment's final act was to serve in Iraq between 2005 and 2006. The new regiment was formed on 1 July 2006, with the Kings Own Royal Border Regiment forming the 3rd Battalion.

== Territorials ==
Upon the regiment's creation the territorial battalions of both predecessor regiments were transferred, without a change in name. These were:

- 5th Battalion, King's Own Royal Regiment, at Lancaster
- 4th (Cumberland and Westmorland) Battalion, The Border Regiment, at Kendal

In 1967, when the TAVR was formed, both of the battalions lost a company to the Lancastrian Volunteers, and also retained the rest of the battalion within the regiment. However, this didn't last very long, as in 1969, the battalions were reduced to cadre– the KORR battalion formed a new company of 1st Battalion, Lancastrian Volunteers; whilst the Border Regiment battalion formed a company of the Northumbrian Volunteers, in 1971.

=== 4th (Volunteer) Battalion ===
In 1975, control of the territorial units was passed back to the affiliated regiments, and so the regiment formed 4th (Volunteer) Battalion, from companies of the Lancastrian Volunteers and Northumbrian Volunteers.

- HQ Company, at Lancaster
- A Company, at Carlisle, with platoon at Workington, from A Company, 1st Battalion, Lancastrian Volunteers
- B Company, at Lancaster, with platoon at Barrow-in-Furness, from E Company, 1st Battalion, Lancastrian Volunteers
- C Company, at Kendal, from B Company, Northumbrian Volunteers

1984 saw the establishment of E (Home Service Force) Company, with a platoon stationed with each company, however this was disbanded along with the rest of the HSF in 1992. At the same time, the battalion was reduced down to a HQ Company, and 3 rifle companies and retained this structure until amalgamation in 1999.

- HQ Company, at Lancaster
- A Company, at Carlisle, with platoon at Workington
- C Company, at Barrow-in-Furness
- D Company, at Workington

The battalion amalgamated with the 4th (Volunteer) Battalion, Queen's Lancashire Regiment, in 1999, to form the Lancastrian and Cumbrian Volunteers; HQ and C Companies amalgamated to form A (Tobruk) (King's Own Royal Border Regiment) Company, and A and D Companies amalgamated to form C (Sicily) (King's Own Royal Border Regiment) Company, of the new regiment. The Lancastrian and Cumbrian Volunteers later amalgamated with the two King's Companies of the King's and Cheshire Regiment, to form 4th Battalion, Duke of Lancaster's Regiment, with the KORBR lineage being maintained by C (Kohima) Company, spread across Workington, Carlisle, Barrow, and Lancaster.

== Regimental museum ==
Archives of the regiment are preserved in Cumbria's Museum of Military Life at Carlisle Castle.

== Colonels-in-Chief ==
- 1977–2006: HRH Princess Alexandra, The Honourable Lady Ogilvy KG GCVO CD

== Regimental Colonels ==
Regimental Colonels have been:

- 1959–1961: Maj-Gen. Valentine Blomfield, CB, DSO (from Border Regiment)
- 1961–1971: Lt-Gen. Richard Neville Anderson, CB, CBE, DSO
- 1971–1981: Gen. Sir William Norman Roy Scotter, KCB, OBE, MC
- 1981–1988: Maj-Gen. David Edwin Miller, CB, CBE, MC
- 1988–2004: Maj-Gen. Robert John Hodges, CB, OBE
- 2004–2006: Brig. Mike Griffiths, CBE, KPM
- 2006: Regiment amalgamated with The King's Regiment and The Queen's Lancashire Regiment to form The Duke of Lancaster's Regiment (King's, Lancashire and Border)

== Sources ==
- Beckett, Ian (2003). Discovering English County Regiments. Shire. ISBN 978-0747805069.
