= Fulwood Barracks =

Military building in Preston, Lancashire, England

- Fulwood, Lancashire
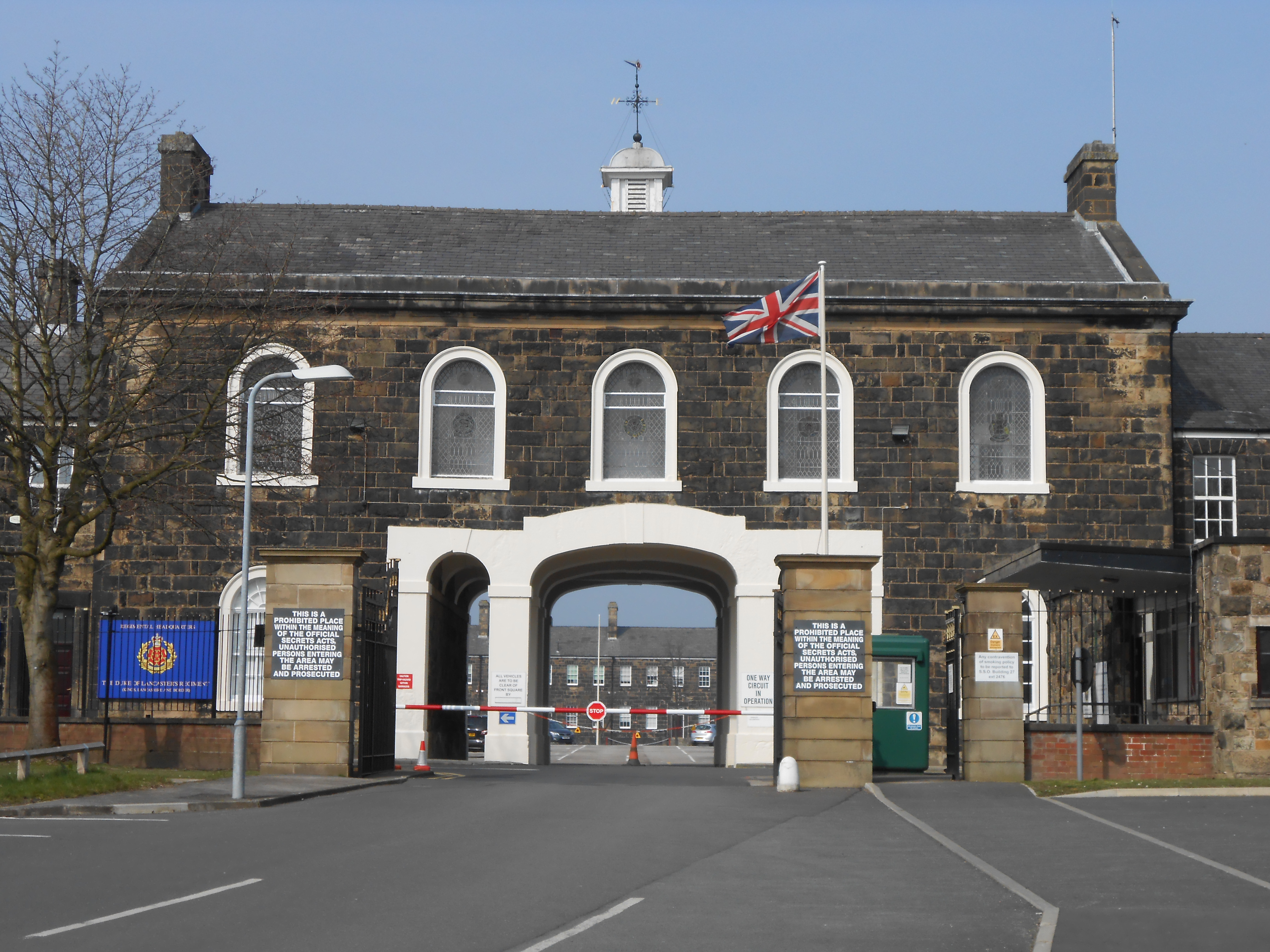
- Fulwood Barracks

Site information
- Type: Barracks
- Owner: Ministry of Defence
- Operator: British Army

Location
- Location within Preston
- Coordinates: 53°46′41″N 02°41′9″W

Site history
- Built: 1842–1848
- Built for: War Office
- In use: 1848-Present

Garrison information
- Occupants: Regimental Headquarters, Duke of Lancaster's Regiment

Fulwood Barracks is a military installation at Fulwood in Preston, Lancashire, England.

== History ==
The barracks were built between 1842 and 1848 as a base, initially at least, for the 2nd Battalion 60th Rifles, following the chartist riots. In 1861, an incident took place when Private Patrick McCaffery shot both the Commanding Officer and the Adjutant of the base: he was hanged for the offence.

In 1873, a system of recruiting areas based on counties was instituted under the Cardwell Reforms and the barracks became the depot for the 47th (Lancashire) Regiment of Foot and the 81st Regiment of Foot (Loyal Lincoln Volunteers). Following the Childers Reforms, the 47th and 81st Regiments amalgamated as the Loyal North Lancashire Regiment, with its depot at the barracks in 1881.

The barracks also served as the depot of the East Lancashire Regiment from 1898, when the regiment re-located from Burnley Barracks, until 1939. The Loyal North Lancashire Regiment and the East Lancashire Regiment both returned to the barracks shortly after the Second World War. The barracks, which went on to become the regional centre for infantry training as the Lancastrian Brigade Depot in 1960, became the depot of the Queen's Lancashire Regiment in 1970 as well as Headquarters North West District in 1977 and the headquarters of 42 (North West) Brigade in 1991. The keep, and 15 other buildings and structures in the barracks, are Grade II listed buildings.

The barracks was formerly Headquarters 42 (North West) Brigade, before it was disbanded in January 2017, being reduced in status to become the cadets-and-reservists Headquarters North West. It has been the Regimental Headquarters of the Duke of Lancaster's Regiment since its formation in 2006.

The barracks was previously home to 3 Medical Regiment. On 28 February 2023, the regiment was disbanded as part of the Army 2020 and Future Soldier integrated reviews. A formal disbandment parade was conducted at Fulwood Barracks, concluding with the commanding officer’s of 22 & 34 Field Hospital accepting command of the regiment’s task-squadron’s as the regiment’s role 1 squadrons resubordinated to command of their new units to create the Army’s first regular ‘Multirole Medical Regiments’. 5 Armoured Medical Regiment then rebranded to become the new 3 Medical Regiment, remaining based at Catterick Garrison.

== Future ==
In November 2016, the Ministry of Defence announced that the site would close in 2022; however this was later put back to 2032.

== Current units ==
Current units stationed at the barracks include:

British Army

- Regimental Headquarters, Duke of Lancaster's Regiment

Community Cadet Forces

- Fulwood Detachment, Lancashire Army Cadet Force

== See also ==
- Kimberley Barracks (Army Reserve barracks located in Preston, just south of Fulwood)
