= 170th Brigade =

170th Brigade may refer to:

- 170th (2/1st North Lancashire) Brigade, United Kingdom
- 170th Infantry Brigade (United States)

== See also ==
- 170th Regiment (disambiguation)
