= John Grey Sandie =

British Army officer

Brigadier John Grey Sandie, DSO, MC, was a senior British Army officer who served as commanding officer of 159th Brigade, in Northwestern Europe, 1942–1944.

== Life ==
John Grey Sandie, born on 14 June 1897, in New Brighton, Cheshire, England, was the son of Robert Leake Sandie and Constance Robertson. He married Stella Marian Ives in 1951, in Norwich, Norfolk, England, United Kingdom.

Commissioned into the Loyal North Lancashire Regiment in 1916, he was later to command the 1st Battalion during the withdrawal to Dunkirk in May 1940. A screen was erected in St John the Evangelist Church, in Preston, in his memory and of those who died there.

Before retiring in 1947, he was Commandant of Small Arms School Hythe.

He died on 21 September 1975, at the age of 78.
