= Derby Barracks, Bolton =

Derby Barracks
- Bolton
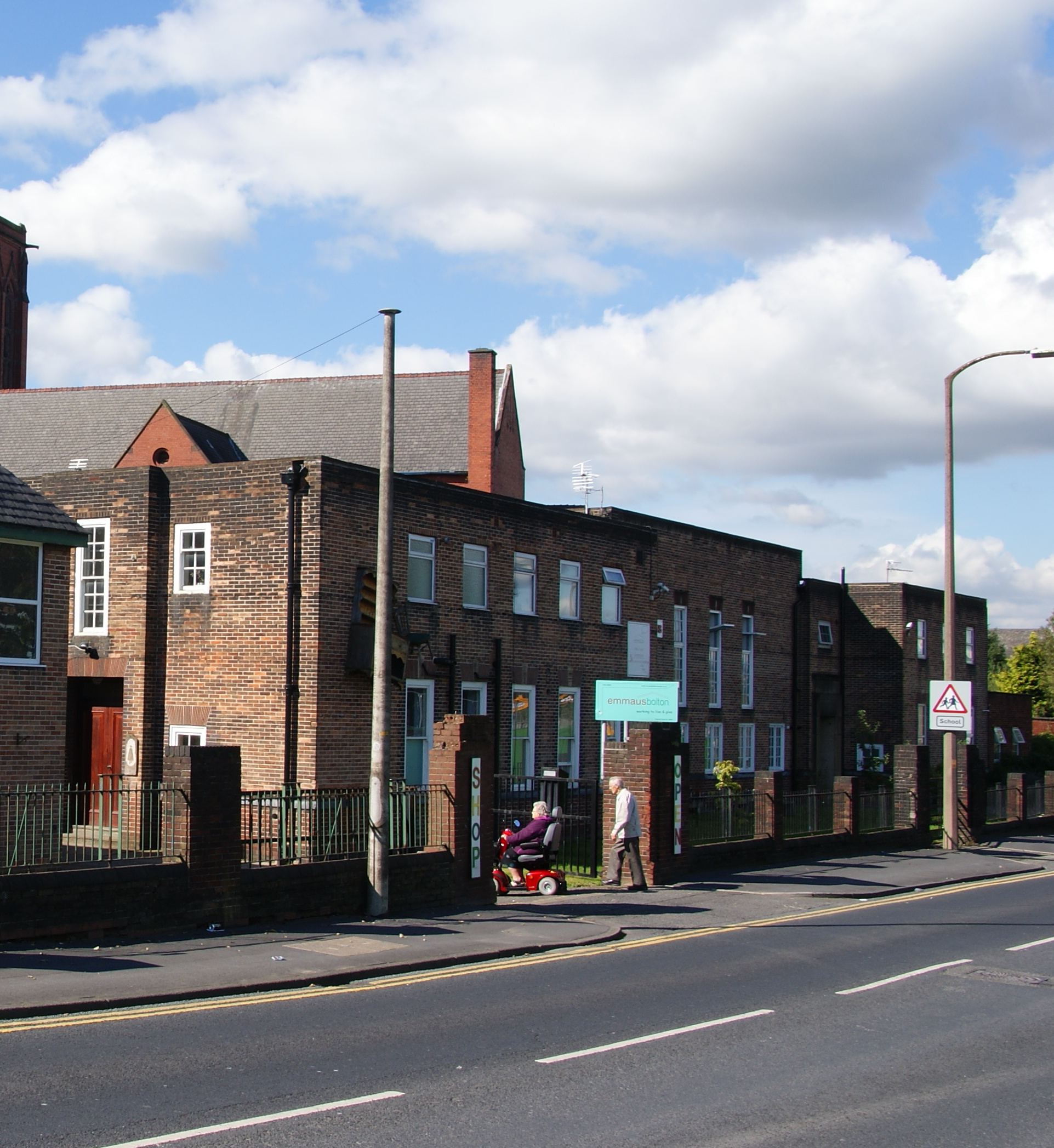
- Derby Barracks

Site information
- Type: Drill hall

Location
- Location within Greater Manchester
- Coordinates: 53.57119°N 2.43342°W

Site history
- Built: Early 1860s
- Built for: War Office
- In use: Early 1860s-2006

Derby Barracks is a former military installation in Fletcher Street, Bolton, Greater Manchester.

== History ==
The original Fletcher Street drill hall was designed as the headquarters of the 27th Lancashire Rifle Volunteer Corps and established by conversion of an old workhouse in the early 1860s. This unit evolved into the 2nd Volunteer Battalion, The Loyal North Lancashire Regiment in 1883 and the 5th Battalion, The Loyal North Lancashire Regiment in 1908. The battalion was mobilised at the drill hall in August 1914 before being deployed to the Western Front and was still based there at the start of the Second World War.

After the Second World War the drill hall was substantial rebuilt and renamed Derby Barracks after Edward Stanley, 17th Earl of Derby, who had been honorary colonel of the battalion. Following the cut-backs in 1967, the presence at the barracks was reduced to a single detachment of C Company, 4th (Volunteer) Battalion, The Queen's Lancashire Regiment in 1975 but expanded again to company strength when C Company established its main base there in 1986. The barracks were still used as a Territorial Army Centre in the late 1990s but were decommissioned and converted for charitable use in 2006.
