= Bolton Rifles =

Bolton Rifles 5th Bn, Loyal Regiment (North Lancashire) 18th Bn, Reconnaissance Corps 2nd Reconnaissance Regiment, RAC
- Active: 1859 – 1992
- Country: United Kingdom
- Branch: Territorial Army
- Role: Infantry; Reconnaissance
- Size: First World War: 4 Battalions; Second World War: 2 Battalions
- Part of: Loyal Regiment (North Lancashire); Reconnaissance Corps
- Garrison/HQ: Bolton
- Engagements: 2nd Boer War; First World War: Battle of the Somme; 3rd Battle of Ypres; Battle of Cambrai; German spring offensive; Hundred Days Offensive; Second World War: Fall of Singapore; Battle of Kohima

The Bolton Rifles, later the 5th Battalion, Loyal North Lancashire Regiment, was a volunteer unit of the British Army from 1859 until 1967. It served on the Western Front during the First World War, and in the Far East during the Second World War, when one battalion was captured at the Fall of Singapore.

== Volunteer Force ==
The enthusiasm for the Volunteer movement following an invasion scare in 1859 saw the creation of many Rifle Volunteer Corps (RVCs) composed of part-time soldiers eager to supplement the Regular British Army in time of need. One such unit was the 3rd Sub-Division of Lancashire Rifle Volunteers formed at Bolton, Lancashire, on 2 December 1859 following meetings at Little Bolton Town Hall on 13 July and 15 November. Generally known locally as The Bolton Rifles, it was named the 27th Lancashire RVC in February 1860, by which time it consisted of four companies (at Bolton, Deane, Farnworth and Kearsley) commanded by Major William Gray, MP with a headquarters at a rented house in Crook Street. It had increased to six companies headquartered in Bridge Street by 1861, when Gray was promoted to lieutenant-colonel, and eight by 1863, headquartered at the old workhouse in Fletcher Street. The smaller 82nd Lancashire RVC (raised at Hindley on 14 June 1861) was attached to it. The Bolton Rifles' uniform was originally light grey with green facings and a grey cap, later changing to scarlet with green facings and regulation spiked helmet.

Under the scheme of 'localisation' introduced by the Cardwell Reforms, Regular infantry battalions became linked in pairs assigned to particular counties or localities, and the county Militia and Volunteers were affiliated to them. From 1873 the 27th Lancashire RVC, with the attached 82nd, was assigned to 'Sub-District No 12', headquartered in Preston and brigaded with the 47th Foot, the 81st Foot, the 3rd Royal Lancashire Militia, and the 6th Administrative Battalion of Lancashire RVCs at Preston. In 1876 it fully absorbed the 82nd Lancashire RVC.

The 27th was renumbered as the 14th Lancashire RVC in 1880, and in 1883 it became the 2nd Volunteer Battalion of the Loyal North Lancashire Regiment formed from the 47th and 81st Foot and 3rd Royal Lancashire Militia under the Childers Reforms. At the same time it absorbed L and M Companies from the 1st VB of the Manchester Regiment; these had originally been the 76th Lancashire RVC (raised at Farnworth on 3 July 1860). The new battalion adopted the scarlet uniform with white facings of the Loyals.

The Stanhope Memorandum of December 1888 introduced a Mobilisation Scheme for Volunteer units, which would assemble in their own brigades at key points in case of war. In peacetime these brigades provided a structure for collective training. The Volunteer Battalions of the Loyals were assigned to the Mersey Brigade, which was later split up and the Loyals reassigned to the Northern Counties Brigade based in Preston. In 1902, this was also split, the Loyals staying with the new North East Lancashire Brigade based in Preston. Finally, in 1906, the brigade was entitled the North Lancashire Brigade and two battalions of the King's Own (Royal Lancaster Regiment) were brigaded with the Loyals.

During the Second Boer War the battalion formed a service company of six officers and 172 volunteers to serve alongside the Regulars, earning the Battle honour South Africa 1900–1902.

== Territorial Force ==
When the Volunteers were subsumed into the new Territorial Force (TF) under the Haldane Reforms of 1908, the battalion became the 5th Battalion Loyal North Lancashire Regiment:

- HQ at Bolton
- A, B, C & E Companies at Bolton
- D Company at Farnworth
- F Company at Astley Bridge
- G Company at Hindley
- H Company at Little Hulton

The North Lancashire Brigade now formed part of the West Lancashire Division of the TF.

== World War I ==
=== Mobilisation ===
Annual training for the West Lancashire Division had just begun at Kirkby Lonsdale when war was declared on 4 August 1914, and all units at once returned to their headquarters for mobilisation. On 10 August the TF was invited to volunteer for Overseas Service and all the units of the West Lancashire Division did so. Following this the War Office issued instructions on 15 August to separate those men who had signed up for Home Service only, and form these into reserve units. On 31 August, the formation of a reserve or 2nd Line unit was authorised for each 1st Line unit where 60 per cent or more of the men had volunteered for Overseas Service. The titles of these 2nd Line units would be the same as the original, but distinguished by a '2/' prefix. In this way, duplicate battalions, brigades and divisions were created, mirroring those TF formations being sent overseas.

The 2/5th Bn Loyals was formed at Bolton in October 1914 and became part of the 2/1st North Lancashire Bde in the 2nd West Lancashire Division. A 3/5th Bn was raised in 1915 to provide drafts to the other battalions when they were serving overseas and the Loyals even formed a 4/5th Bn, which served on the Western Front.

=== 1/5th Loyals ===
The 1/5th Bn mobilised in Bolton and moved to Chipping Sodbury in Gloucestershire, where it guarded the railway line from Wootton Bassett to Avonmouth Docks. In November, it moved to Sevenoaks in Kent and prepared for overseas service.

==== 6th Division ====
Many units from the West Lancashire Division went to France to provide reinforcements for the British Expeditionary Force (BEF), and the 1/5th Loyals was one of these, disembarking at Le Havre on 13 February 1915. Two days later, it joined the Regulars of the 16th Brigade in 6th Division at Armentières. Parties went into the line on 22 February for instruction by experienced units, and the battalion suffered its first casualties on 27 February.

In mid-March, 16 Brigade moved north to the Ypres Salient but 1/5th Loyals remained in the Armentières sector, temporarily attached to 17th Brigade and taking turns in holding the line. At the beginning of June, the remainder of 6th Division moved to Ypres, where the casualties suffered in line-holding rose.

==== 50th Division ====
But, on 11 June 1916, the 1/5th Loyals left 6th Division and moved to Vlamertinge, where it joined 151st (Durham Light Infantry) Brigade in 50th (Northumbrian) Division. It was held in reserve at Hooge for the second British attack on Bellewaarde of 16 June. During the night of 16/17 June, the battalion was ordered up to Sanctuary Wood to reinforce 5th Bn Border Regiment of 149th (Northumberland) Brigade, although it was not heavily engaged.

1/5th Loyals remained with 50th Division holding trenches in the Ypres area until November 1915, when it was sent for training. It temporarily joined 26th Bde in 9th (Scottish) Division on 21 December 1915.

==== 55th Division ====
At the beginning of 1916, the West Lancashire Division was reformed in France as the 55th (West Lancashire) Division and the 1/5th Loyals returned to it on 8 January 1916 at Hallencourt near Abbeville, joining the 166th (South Lancashire) Brigade). In February, the division relieved a French division in the line south of Arras. During the early summer, the division carried out a number of trench raids to divert attention from the Somme sector where a great offensive was being prepared.

==== Guillemont ====
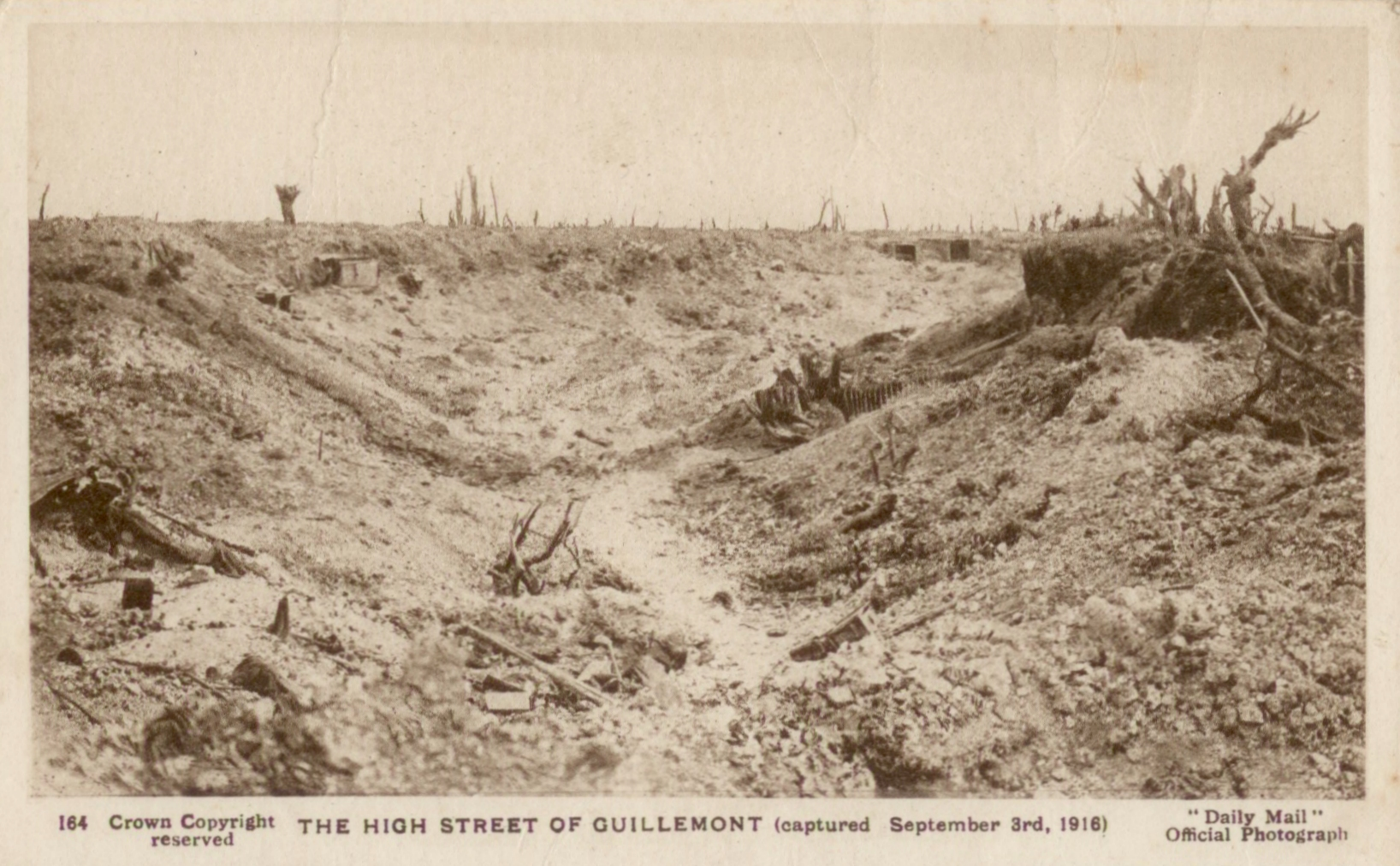
The High Street of Guillemont, 1916

On 25 July, the 55th Division was relieved and travelled south to join in the Somme offensive. It moved into the line opposite Guillemont on 30 July and prepared to attack on 8 August (the Battle of Guillemont). 164th (North Lancashire) Brigade made the initial attack, and 1/5th Loyals moved out early on to support it. B and C Companies were sent on to occupy trenches running north between the Trones–Guillemont road and Railway Support Trench, C Company then continuing to join 1/8th Bn King's Liverpool Regiment (the Liverpool Irish) in the front line. Soon afterwards A and D Companies were ordered up to join 2/5th Bn Lancashire Fusiliers. However, the attack had failed with heavy casualties and the division was ordered to repeat it the following day. This time 1/5th Loyals and the 1/10th King's Liverpool (Liverpool Scottish) were to lead. There was no preliminary bombardment, only a short covering barrage beginning at 04:20. The Liverpool Scottish followed this barrage closely and got as far as the enemy wire, which was uncut. But because of the late arrival of the orders and the crowded trenches on the way up, the 1/5th Loyals could not get into position until after 05:00, long after the barrage had ended. Nevertheless, the battalion 'made a most gallant assault' at 05:25; unable to reach the enemy trenches, they were forced back to their starting point. Every officer with the right hand companies became a casualty. Battalion losses totalled 33 killed, 85 wounded and 20 missing.

During August, the battalion received a draft of reinforcements and returned to the line on 5 September, but it took no direct part in the division's battles of that month except to hold reserve trenches. At the end of the month the division moved to the Ypres area, where the battalion occupied a reserve line on the Yser Canal, suffering numerous casualties from artillery fire. Thereafter, it took its turns in holding the front line, the only notable action being a large raid carried out in January 1917, which was only partially successful and resulted in heavy losses in proportion to the numbers engaged: 8 killed, 50 wounded and 2 missing from a party of 144.

==== Pilckem Ridge ====
The battalion remained in the Salient during the early months of 1917, carrying out diversionary activities during the Battle of Messines. 55th Division was then involved on the opening day of the Third Ypres Offensive (the Battle of Pilckem Ridge on 31 July). The 55th Division attacked with 166th Bde on the left, 1/5th Loyals and 1/5th King's Own leading. At 05:30, the battalion went 'over the top', attacked the opposing German trench on a frontage of 350 yards and penetrated 400 yards into the German position. The First and Second Objectives were taken, and 164th Bde passed through to take the third objective, the Gheluvelt–Langemarck Line. The Germans counter-attacked at 14:35 once the protective artillery barrage had ended and before the line could be consolidated. The division was forced to fall back to the second objective, where it established a strong position. Casualties among 1/5th Loyals up to the time it was relieved amounted to 158 all ranks killed, wounded and missing. The division was withdrawn for rest and retraining at St Omer.

==== Menin Road ====
55th Division returned to the line for the Battle of the Menin Road Ridge, starting on 20 September. The objective was essentially the same as the third objective of 31 July, except that this time 166th Bde was in support, with 1/5th Loyals assigned to 165th Bde. The creeping barrage began at 05.45 and the 164th and 165th Bdes attacked. Severe fighting ensued, and at 09.45 two companies of 1/5th Loyals were ordered forward to reinforce 1/6th King's Liverpool Regiment and attack Hill 37. They captured the hill at 11:00 but lost it to a counter-attack at 11:20, after which the Germans occupied it in great strength. Fighting continued round the hill all afternoon before it finally fell into British hands at 17:00, but by then a gap had opened between Hill 37 and a position known as the Capitol. The other two companies of 1/5th Loyals were sent to capture Gallipoli Copse and get into contact with Hill 37 on their right and the Capitol on their left. They captured Gallipoli Copse by 18:20 and completed the line. The battalion's casualties amounted to 167 all ranks.

==== Cambrai ====
The division now moved south to recuperate in the Somme sector. The battalion was not involved in the division's attack on Guillemont Farm on 20 September, which was a diversion to assist the British attack at Cambrai. The division then took over a wider front, which left it stretched and vulnerable to the German counter-attack. On the morning of 30 November 1/5th Loyals was holding the sector from Banteau Ravine to Wood Road. At 07:00 the Germans opened a heavy bombardment on the divisional frontage, keeping all the roads under fire and cutting off communications. They then attacked through a heavy mist and penetrated the line on the battalion's left, threatening Villers-Guislain. 1/5th Loyals made a stand and suffered heavy casualties, but delayed the enemy advance. In the afternoon they were forced to withdraw, but Limerick Post, held by a composite party of 1/5th Loyals and the Liverpool Scottish held out, despite being surrounded. A counter-attack by 1/4th Loyals coming from reserve saved the situation, briefly retaking Villers-Guislain and eventually digging in at Vaucellette Farm before nightfall. The party at Limerick Post made their way back to British lines at 05.00 the following morning. 1/5th Loyals' casualties had been appalling: only two were known to be killed and 30 wounded, but 402 were posted missing.

When the BEF's manpower crisis in early 1918 led to each brigade being reduced by one battalion, the shattered 1/5th Loyals was an obvious candidate for disbandment. A number of officers and men were cross-posted to the 1/4th and 2/4th Loyals in late January, and on 4 February 1918 the remainder of the battalion merged with the 2/5th Bn in 57th Division (see below), which from then on was simply called the 5th Bn.

During its service on the Western Front with 55th Division, 1/5th Loyals' casualties totalled 30 officers and 408 other ranks killed, 28 officers and 1333 ORs wounded, 1 officer and 45 ORs missing.

==== Commanding officers ====
The following officers commanded 1/5th Loyals during the First World War:

- Lt-Col G. Hesketh, DSO, TD
- Lt-Col G.D. Morton, MC

=== 2/5th Loyals ===
The battalion was formed at Bolton in October 1914 and was assigned to the 2/1st North Lancashire Bde in the 2nd West Lancashire Division in Spring 1915. These were redesignated 170th Bde and 57th (2nd West Lancashire) Division respectively in August 1915. A serious shortage of equipment hampered the training of the 2nd Line TF units and the only weapons available were .256-in Japanese Ariska rifles.

In September 1915, the 57th Division assembled round Canterbury in Kent, with the 2/5th Loyals at Ashford. Serious training could now begin, and Lee-Enfield service rifles were issued in November (though these were not in good condition). Lewis guns arrived towards the end of February 1916. In July the division was moved to Aldershot Command and the 2/5th Loyals went to Blackdown Camp.

==== In the line ====
In January 1917, the division was deemed fit for service and crossed to France, the 2/5th Loyals landing at Le Havre on 9 February 1917 under the command of Lt-Col C.G. Hitchins. The division joined II ANZAC Corps and took over a sector of the front line on 25 February. Having gained experience of trench warfare, it began carrying out trench raids in May.

On 1 June, the battalion marched to Armentières and the following day relieved an Australian battalion in Ploegsteert Wood; together with 2/4th Loyals it now formed part of 'Geddes Force' under 3rd Australian Division, assigned to form the right flank of the attack on Messines Ridge on 7 June. The battalion was heavily shelled throughout the 10-day detachment

==== Passchendaele ====
In mid-September, 57th Division was withdrawn from the line and underwent a month's training before moving to the Ypres Salient to participate in the Second Battle of Passchendaele. At 05.40 on 26 October, 170th Bde attacked through appalling mud that clogged rifles and Lewis guns. 2/5th Loyals attacked with three companies leading. These had scarcely gone more than 50 yards before they came under intense machine gun fire, which caused a great number of casualties. All the company officers in these waves became casualties and the battle was fought by the sergeants and junior NCOs. Eight machine guns were captured and small groups reached and held some shell craters about 500 yards from the start line, but the decision was made to withdraw them to defend the starting line. The battalion was relieved that night. In its first major action it had suffered 48 killed or died of wounds, 153 wounded and 87 missing.

==== Pioneers ====
External image
- 5th Loyals
- 5th Loyals entering Cambrai, 10 October 1918

On 4–5 February 1918, the 1/5th Bn from 55th Division (see above) and 4/5th Bn (see below) merged with the 2/5th Bn, which from then on was simply called the 5th Bn. It also received large drafts from the ('Kitchener's Army') 8th and 9th Service Bns Loyals. The merged battalion reorganised on a three-company basis, left 170th Bde, and became the divisional pioneer battalion, at the recommendation of the divisional commander, who recognised the large number of former coal-miners in its ranks. It was immediately put to work strengthening the division's defences.

The division remained in quiet sectors during the German spring offensive, but the 5th Loyals were moved about frequently on different pioneer tasks, suffering a trickle of casualties as a result. Once the Allied Hundred Days Offensive was under way, the pioneers were distributed by companies to follow closely behind the advancing troops and improve the roads in the forward area. On 27 September, the 57th Division forced the line of the Canal du Nord. 170th Brigade's attack was led by the pioneers of the 5th Loyals, with two companies of 2/4th Loyals in support for mopping-up and then defending the captured ground. On 9 October, the 5th Loyals were among the first troops to liberate the town of Cambrai. Again, they were among the first British troops to enter Lille, and afterwards the battalion provided a Guard of honour for President Georges Clemenceau when he visited the city on 16 October. The battalion was at Tournai when the Armistice with Germany was signed.

After hostilities ceased, the battalion was assigned to 171st Bde, clearing and evacuating stores in the Arras area, where demobilisation began in January 1919. By the end of March, the units had been reduced to cadres and the last left France in June. 5th Loyals was disembodied on 25 June.

=== 3/5th Loyals ===
This battalion was formed at Fletcher Street Barracks in Bolton in April 1915. It moved to Weeton Camp, near Kirkham, Lancashire, in June, where it went under canvas with the other 3rd Line battalions of the North Lancashire Brigade. In October it moved to Blackpool, where it was accommodated in billets in the South Shore District under the command of Lt-Col F.W. Foley. The battalion's role was to provide drafts for the 1/5th and 2/5th Bns, and it appears not to have been short of recruits. At this date, TF men could not be transferred from one regiment to another without their consent, but in April 1916 the battalion's Honorary Colonel, the Earl of Derby (who was also Under-Secretary of State for War), asked for 200 volunteers to transfer to the 2/4th King's Own: 212 immediately offered themselves. In June, there were enough trained men to form a 4/5th Bn to replace the under-recruited 2/4th King's Own in 170th Bde for overseas service (see below).

The 3/5th Loyals was then in training at Oswestry, changing its designation to 5th Reserve Bn on 8 April 1916. On 1 September 1916, it was absorbed into the 4th Reserve Bn as part of the Training Reserve.

=== 4/5th Loyals ===
This battalion joined 170th Bde in 57th Division at Ashford. It landed at Le Havre on 12 February 1917 and thereafter its service was the same as the 2/5th Bn. On 26 October it attacked at Passchendaele at 05.45, following the barrage at a distance of 25–50 yards despite the mud and waterlogged shell craters. The reserve company had to pass through the enemy's retaliatory barrage, and there was light machine-gunning. But once the battalion reached the Green Line at 06.20 it was held up by a crossfire from enemy pillboxes. A few of these pillboxes were captured and a counter-attack was driven off, but for most of the day the battalion lay in the mud suffering heavy casualties from machine guns and air attack. At 21.00, the battalion was withdrawn, having suffered 66 killed, 170 wounded and 53 missing.

On 4 February 1918, the 4/5th merged with 1/5th and 2/5th Bns to form the divisional pioneer battalion (see above).

=== 14th Loyals ===
The men of the TF who had not signed up for overseas service were separated from their battalions in 1915 and formed into Provisional Battalions for coast defence. These men from the 2/4th, 3/4th, 2/5th and 3/5th Loyals were formed into the 42nd Provisional Battalion at Herne Bay, Kent, on 1 September 1915 and joined 9th Provisional Brigade, later in 218th Brigade in 73rd Division at Witham in Essex.

The Home Service men continued serving in home defence until 1916, when the Military Service Act swept away the Home/Overseas service distinction and the provisional battalions took on the dual role of home defence and physical conditioning to render men fit for drafting overseas. The 42nd Provisional Battalion officially became the 14th Bn Loyals (TF) at Broadstairs on 1 January 1917. The battalion never served overseas, and as the men were drafted away it was disbanded on 17 December 1917.

== Interwar ==
The TF was reconstituted on 2 February 1920 and the 5th Loyals was reformed at Bolton. The 55th (West Lancashire) Division began to reform in April 1920 as part of Western Command. The 5th Loyals were once again in 164th (North Lancashire) Brigade. The TF was reorganised as the Territorial Army (TA) in 1921.

In 1938, as part of the modernisation of the army, the 55th was converted into the 55th (West Lancashire) Motor Division, and 164th Bde was disbanded. The 5th Loyals was converted into a divisional motorcycle battalion. When the TA was doubled in size after the Munich Crisis, 5th Loyals spun off a duplicate battalion at Macclesfield 3 May 1939. Initially, the regiment followed the World War I practice and used '1/' and '2/' prefixes, but on 16 May the Loyals designated the new unit the 6th Battalion, re-using the number of a Kitchener's Army battalion of 1914–18.

== World War II ==
=== Mobilisation ===
The TA was mobilised on 1 September 1939, just before the outbreak of World War II. The 5th and 6th Loyals mobilised at Derby Barracks, Bolton, as motorcycle battalions in 55th Division. However, from 15 September the division's duplicate units, including 6th Loyals, were formed into the 59th (Staffordshire) Infantry Division. Neither of these divisions joined the British Expeditionary Force in France, and were still training in the UK when the Battle of France broke out. 5th Loyals had just been transferred to a new 20th Independent Infantry Brigade (Guards) on 24 April 1940 but was left behind when the brigade was hurriedly sent to the Defence of Boulogne on 22 May 1940.

=== 18th Battalion Reconnaissance Corps ===
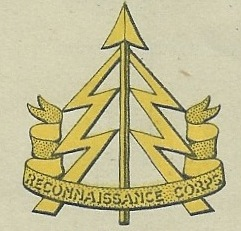
Cap badge of the Reconnaissance Corps, 1941

In January 1941, the Reconnaissance Corps was formed to provide reconnaissance ('recce') units for infantry divisions. A number of existing motor-cycle infantry battalions were transferred to the new corps, and 5th Loyals joined 18th Division at Madeley Heath, Staffordshire, as its recce battalion. It was redesignated 18th Battalion, Reconnaissance Corps on 26 April 1941. The basic equipment of the new battalions was Humber Light Reconnaissance Cars, Universal Carriers, and 15-hundredweight light trucks, though much of the early equipment used in training was improvised, such as Beaverettes in place of the Humber LRCs.

18th Battalion was the first unit of the new Recce Corps to see action. Along with 18th Division it had been shipped from England bound for Middle East Command, but while in the Indian Ocean it was diverted to the Far East following the Japanese invasion of Malaya. After staging in India, it followed the main body of the division to Singapore, landing on 5 February 1942. Having lost the bulk of its weapons and equipment when Japanese dive-bombers attacked its troopship Empress of Asia, the unit hastily re-equipped as an infantry battalion and moved into the northern sector of the defences of Singapore Island. Two companies were detached to 54th Bde, the remainder were with divisional HQ.

The British commander, Lt-Gen Arthur Percival, considered that the village of Bukit Timah was the key to the defence and on 10 February he ordered 18th Division to form an ad hoc force to occupy it. Commanded by Lt-Col L.C. Thomas, it was known as 'Tomforce' and consisted of 18th Recce Bn, 4th Bn Royal Norfolk Regiment, 1/5th Bn Sherwood Foresters, a battery of 85th Anti-Tank Regiment, Royal Artillery, and a battery of 5th Field Regiment, Royal Artillery. Japanese tanks were attacking Bukit Timah and the village was in flames. Tomforce was ordered to send 18th Recce Bn forward but the position had been lost by midnight, so the battalion was disposed across the road, supporting an Australian road block.

Tomforce counter-attacked on 11 February, with 4th Norfolks on the right, 18th Recce astride the road in the centre and 1/5th Sherwood Foresters on the left, but it was facing two Japanese divisions and was driven back. That afternoon it came under 'ferocious aerial and artillery attack', which it held off with support from the heavy coastal artillery (9.2-inch and 6-inch guns) at Connaught and Siloso Batteries.

By 13 February, the whole force was defending a perimeter covering Singapore city, with the remnants of Tomforce still holding the Burkit Timah road. The battalion continued to hold its positions, and carried out counter-attacks until the surrender of the whole British force in Singapore on 18 February. 18th Recce Bn had suffered 55 officers and men killed, and a further 264 died as prisoners of war before the end of the war.

=== 2nd Reconnaissance Regiment ===
The 6th Loyals, like its parent unit, was also trained as a motorcycle battalion. Having left 59th Division in June 1940, it joined 2nd Division, a Regular Army formation, on 30 November, and remained with it until the end of the war. It was redesignated 2nd Battalion, Reconnaissance Corps on 26 April 1941. The Recce Corps later adopted cavalry nomenclature, and the unit was redesignated again as 2nd Reconnaissance Regiment on 6 June 1942, with squadrons replacing companies.

By then, it was in India, the 2nd Division having been transferred there in April 1942, arriving at Bombay in early June. It went into training at Poona, but training was interrupted by internal security duties necessitated by the unrest after the arrest of Mahatma Gandhi, and then anti-bandit duties later in the year.

The regiment was reorganised, gaining an additional squadron (D Sqn), while A and later C Sqns were equipped with amphibious LVT-1 Alligators and assigned to 36th Indian Division for a proposed operation on the coast of Burma. However, the operation was cancelled, the two squadrons relinquished the equipment and returned to the regiment. The Reconnaissance Corps formally became part of the Royal Armoured Corps on 1 January 1944.

In the spring of 1944, during the Japanese advance on Kohima, the division moved up to Dimapur in Assam. At first, 2nd Recce Rgt had A Sqn disposed along 18 miles of the Dimapur–Kohima road, with the rest of the regiment in a defensive 'Box' at Zubza. In late April, HQ Sqn moved to Punjab Hill and D Sqn to Lone Tree Hill. Then, in May, after the division had relieved the garrison of Kohima, the regiment was given an infantry role, to force the enemy off the high jungle-covered slopes of Aradura Spur, which they had held since the beginning of the battle. The operation began on 11 May with an attack on Pulebadze Ridge, which eventually sucked in the whole regiment. The conditions were extreme, with porters the only means of transport, and the Japanese defenders were willing to accept heavy casualties. After weeks of attritional fighting, 2nd Recce Rgt was withdrawn at the end of the month for resupply. Although the Aradura Spur was not taken, the Japanese 31st Division was virtually destroyed.

It was not until the autumn of 1944 that the regiment was committed to an active role in Fourteenth Army's offensive to re-capture Burma. By then D Sqn had been disbanded and the regiment had been reorganised as a light recce regiment. For five weeks in January and February 1945 it was used as a decoy to persuade the Japanese that the attack was going to be made on the Sagaing Hills from the north. It later provided a covering force ('Hookforce') for an RAF airstrip at Sadaung consisting of C Sqn under Major Hook with A Company of the Nepalese Army's Mahindra Dal Regiment.

During the advance through Burma, the regiment's main problem was a shortage of vehicles: it only had enough carriers for four Troops, and scout cars for two Troops. However, it operated aggressively: Lieutenant Tarmey's troop developed the tactic of driving into enemy positions 'with Brens firing before dismounting and rolling grenades into Japanese bunkers'. Corporal McAleer of this troop won a Military Medal, while in the course of several actions by Lt Sutton's troop, Sergeant Rothwell gained a Distinguished Conduct Medal.

The regiment continued its active role until after the Fourteenth Army had advanced beyond Mandalay, suffering relatively few casualties given the amount of combat it saw. It was withdrawn on 7 April 1945, and the war had ended before it could return to action.

== Postwar ==
Both battalions formally passed into 'suspended animation' as infantry under their old titles of 5th an, 6th Bns on 1 July 1946. When the TA was reconstituted on 1 January 1947, the 5th Loyals was reformed at Derby Barracks, Bolton, and absorbed the 6th Bn. By 1950, it had the following dispositions:

- HQ and D Company at Bolton
- S Company at Bolton and Little Hulton
- A Company at Kimberly Barracks, Preston
- B Company at Farnworth
- C Company at Hindley

On the reduction of the TA in 1967, the battalion became D Company (Loyals) in the Lancastrian Volunteers. From 1971, it was part of 2nd Bn Lancastrian Volunteers, which in 1975 became 4th (Volunteer) Bn, The Queen's Lancashire Regiment. C Company retained a platoon at Bolton, which remained as C Company of 4th Bn when the rest of the company was transferred to 5th Bn Royal Regiment of Fusiliers, but the Bolton connection ended in 1992.

== Honorary Colonels ==
The following officers served as Honorary Colonel of the unit:

- William Gray, the first CO, appointed 5 February 1872.
- Edward Stanley, 17th Earl of Derby appointed 17 May 1899 (concurrently Hon Col of the 4th Bn Loyals from 1909)

== See also ==
- John Hick
