= Henry Edward Kenny =

English recipient of the Victoria Cross (1888–1979)

- Born: 27 July 1888; Woolwich, London
- Died: 6 May 1979 (aged 90); Chertsey, Surrey
- Burial place: St. Johns Cemetery, Woking
- Military career
- Allegiance: United Kingdom
- Branch: British Army
- Rank: Sergeant
- Units: Loyal North Lancashire Regiment; Home Guard
- Conflicts: First World War
- Awards: Victoria Cross

Henry Edward Kenny VC (Irish: Annraoi Éamonn Ó Cionnaith; 27 July 1888 – 6 May 1979), was an English recipient of the Victoria Cross, the highest and most prestigious award for gallantry in the face of the enemy that can be awarded to British and Commonwealth forces.

== Details ==
Born in Woolwich, London, Kenny was 27 years old, and a private in the 1st Battalion, Loyal North Lancashire Regiment, British Army during the First World War when the deed took place for which he was awarded the VC.

For most conspicuous bravery. Private Kenny went out on six different occasions on one day under a very heavy shell, rifle and machine-gun fire, and each time succeeded in carrying to a place of safety a wounded man who had been lying in the open. He was himself wounded in the neck whilst handing the last man over his parapet.

He later achieved the rank of sergeant and served with the Home Guard. He died on 6 May 1979 at the age of 90.

== The Medal ==
His VC is on display in the Lord Ashcroft Gallery at the Imperial War Museum, London.

== Commemoration ==
On 25 September 2015, the centenary of his deed, a commemorative paving stone was unveiled in Maryon Park, Charlton, London, near his place of birth.

== Bibliography ==
- Irish Winners of the Victoria Cross (Richard Doherty & David Truesdale, 2000)
- Batchelor, Peter; Matson, Christopher (2011). The Western Front 1915. VCs of the First World War. The History Press. ISBN 978-0-7524-6057-4.
