= John Hasluck Campbell =

Brigadier-General John Hasluck Campbell CVO
- Born: 1855
- Died: 29 January 1921 (aged 65–66)
- Military career
- Allegiance: United Kingdom
- Branch: British Army
- Rank: Brigadier-General
- Commands: 170th (2/1st North Lancashire) Brigade; 200th (2/1st Surrey) Brigade; East Anglian Division
- Conflicts: First World War
- Awards: Commander of the Royal Victorian Order

Brigadier-General John Hasluck Campbell CVO (1855 – 29 January 1921) was a British Army officer.

== Military career ==
Campbell was commissioned into the 93rd (Sutherland Highlanders) Regiment of Foot, later the Argyll and Sutherland Highlanders, on 10 September 1875.

He was placed on half-pay on 27 June 1903 after having served as commanding officer (CO) of a battalion of his regiment. He was promoted to colonel on the same date.

On 1 April 1908 he was appointed the first general officer commanding (GOC) of the newly formed East Anglian Division of the Territorial Force (TF), and, having been appointed a Commander of the Royal Victorian Order (CVO) on 25 October 1909, handed over his command in October 1910.

He became commander of the 170th (2/1st North Lancashire) Brigade in November 1914 and then transferred to the command of 200th (2/1st Surrey) Brigade in June 1915. He deployed to France in June 1917 and served on the Western Front until relieved in September 1918.

Campbell's family were from Inverardoch in Doune and he died, at the age of 65, on 29 January 1921.

Military offices
New title	GOC East Anglian Division; August–October 1908	Succeeded by Julian Byng
