= Preston Rifles =

Preston Rifles 4th Bn, Loyal Regiment (North Lancashire) 62nd (Loyals) Searchlight Regiment, RA 150th (Loyals) Light AA Regiment, RA 597 (The Loyal) LAA/SL Regiment, RA
- Active: 4 October 1859 – 1 September 1950
- Country: United Kingdom
- Branch: Territorial Army
- Type: Infantry Battalion; Searchlight Regiment; Light Anti-Aircraft Regiment
- Size: Battalion (First World War: 3 Battalions); Regiment
- Part of: Loyal Regiment (North Lancashire); Royal Artillery
- Garrison/HQ: Preston, Lancashire
- Engagements: 2nd Boer War; First World War: Battle of the Somme; 3rd Battle of Ypres; Battle of Cambrai; German spring offensive; Hundred Days Offensive; Second World War: The Blitz; Defence of Antwerp

The Preston Rifles, later the 4th Battalion, Loyal North Lancashire Regiment, was a volunteer unit of the British Army from 1859 until the 1950s. It served as infantry on the Western Front and in Ireland during the First World War, and as an air defence unit during The Blitz and the campaign in North West Europe during the Second World War.

== Volunteer Force ==
The enthusiasm for the Volunteer movement following an invasion scare in 1859 saw the creation of many Rifle Volunteer Corps (RVCs) composed of part-time soldiers eager to supplement the Regular British Army in time of need. One such unit was the 11th (1st Preston) Lancashire RVC, formed at Preston, Lancashire, on 4 October 1859 under the command of Henry Newsham Pedder, late of the 3rd Royal Lancashire Militia and grandson of the founder of Preston's first bank.

In February 1860 the unit absorbed two other Preston corps, the 12th (2nd Preston) RVC and the 30th (Fishwick) RVC, becoming a three-company corps. In July 1861 one of the original captains, William Henry Goodair, a member of a local cotton manufacturing family, took over as Major-Commandant. The corps became part of the 6th Administrative Battalion of Lancashire RVCs formed in September 1861, the other units being the 44th at Longton, the 59th at Leyland, and the 61st (two companies) at Chorley. The 6th Admin Battalion had its headquarters at Preston.

In July 1865 the 11th Lancashire RVC was given special permission to adopt The Preston Rifle Volunteer Corps as its official designation. The 11th absorbed the 44th RVC in 1866 and the 61st RVC in November 1868, reaching a strength of eight companies. Goodair was promoted to lieutenant-colonel in 1867, and Captain George H. Lightoller of the 61st RVC became Major in 1868. Simultaneously Goodair was major of the 6th Admin Bn commanded by Lt-Col Sir Thomas Hesketh, Bt. (The Pedder, Goodair and Lightoller families recur among the names of the unit's officers over the next few decades.)

Under the scheme of 'localisation' introduced by the Cardwell Reforms, Regular infantry battalions became linked in pairs assigned to particular counties or localities, and the county Militia and Volunteers were affiliated to them. From 1873 the 6th Admin Bn was attached to 'Sub-District No 12', headquartered in Preston and brigaded with the 47th Foot, the 81st Foot and the 3rd Royal Lancashire Militia.

In the reorganisation of the Volunteers in 1880, the whole 6th Admin Bn was consolidated on 16 March as the 11th Lancashire RVC with the following dispositions:

- HQ at Preston
- A to E Companies at Preston
- F Company at Leyland
- G, H and J Companies at Chorley.

Its uniform was scarlet with white facings.

On 1 July 1881 the unit became a Volunteer Battalion of the Preston-based Loyal North Lancashire Regiment formed from the 47th and 81st Foot (Regulars) and 3rd Royal Lancashire Militia under the Childers Reforms. It was designated the 1st Volunteer Battalion from 1 February 1883. The Stanhope Memorandum of December 1888 introduced a Mobilisation Scheme for Volunteer units, which would assemble in their own brigades at key points in case of war. In peacetime these brigades provided a structure for collective training. The Volunteer Battalions of the Loyals were assigned to the Mersey Brigade, which was later split up and the Loyals reassigned to the Northern Counties Brigade based in Preston. In 1902 this was also split, the Loyals staying with the new North East Lancashire Brigade in Preston. Finally, in 1906 the brigade was entitled the North Lancashire Brigade and two battalions of the King's Own (Royal Lancaster Regiment) were brigaded with the Loyals.

During the Second Boer War the battalion formed a service company of volunteers to serve alongside the Regulars, earning the Battle honour South Africa 1900–1902.

== Territorial Force ==
When the Volunteers were subsumed into the new Territorial Force (TF) under the Haldane Reforms of 1908, the battalion became the 4th Battalion Loyal North Lancashire Regiment:

- HQ at Preston
- A, C & D Companies at Preston
- B Company at Longridge
- E Company at Lytham
- F Company at Horwich
- G & H Companies at Devonshire Road, Chorley

The North Lancashire Brigade now formed part of the West Lancashire Division of the TF.

== First World War ==
=== Mobilisation ===
Annual training for the West Lancashire Division had just begun at Kirkby Lonsdale when war was declared on 4 August 1914, and the units at once returned to their headquarters for mobilisation. On 10 August the TF were invited to volunteer for Overseas Service and all the units of the West Lancashire Division did so.

On 15 August 1914, the War Office issued instructions to separate those men who had signed up for Home Service only, and form these into reserve units. On 31 August, the formation of a reserve or 2nd Line unit was authorised for each 1st Line unit where 60 per cent or more of the men had volunteered for Overseas Service. The titles of these 2nd Line units would be the same as the original, but distinguished by a '2/' prefix. In this way duplicate battalions, brigades and divisions were created, mirroring those TF formations being sent overseas. Later the 2nd Line also began to serve overseas.

The 2/4th Bn Loyals was formed at Preston in October 1914 and became part of the 2/1st North Lancashire Bde in the 2nd West Lancashire Division. A 3/4th Bn was raised in 1915 to provide drafts to the other battalions when they were serving overseas.

=== 1/4th Loyals ===
The 1/4th Bn mobilised at 9 Avenham Lane, Preston, and moved on 22 August to Swindon in Wiltshire, and then in November to Sevenoaks in Kent.

==== 51st (Highland) Division ====
Many units of the West Lancashire Division went to France independently to provide reinforcements for the British Expeditionary Force (BEF), and by the end of March 1915 only the North Lancashire Brigade was left in England. The following month it was posted to 51st (Highland) Division at Bedford, which crossed to France at the beginning of May. The 1/4th Loyals disembarked at Boulogne on 4 May. Designated the 154th Brigade, the North Lancashire Brigade fought with the Highlanders for the rest of the year. The 1/4th Loyals first went into the line on 25 May in the closing stages of the Battle of Festubert.

==== Givenchy ====
The 1/4th Loyals made their first general attack on 15 June, the first day of the Battle of Givenchy. Led by C Company, it advanced at 06.00 alongside the 6th Cameronians (Scottish Rifles) and at first all went well: the west end of a German salient was carried and the attackers moved on to the German main line, getting as far as the third line of trenches. However, the advance was halted by a mass of uncut wire, while B and D Companies trying to get across No man's land to support C Company suffered heavy casualties from the German counter-barrage, as did A Company in support. Although it had a lodgement in the enemy positions, 154th Bde had both flanks 'in the air'. The battalion attempted to dig in, but by midnight, with the Commanding Officer (CO), Lt-Col R. Hindle, wounded and German counter-attacks coming in, it was forced to withdraw, finally getting back to its own lines in the early morning mist of 16 June. The 1/4th Loyals had lost 431 men killed, wounded and missing, and took no further part in the battle.

In late June and July the battalion held trenches in the Laventie sector, and then in August the 51st (Highland) Division took over part of the line near the Ancre from the French. However, the weak 1/4th Bn was mainly in brigade or divisional reserve until it received a draft of 100 reinforcements from the 2/4th Bn. At the end of the year the battalion was occupying trenches near Authuille.

==== 55th (West Lancashire) Division ====
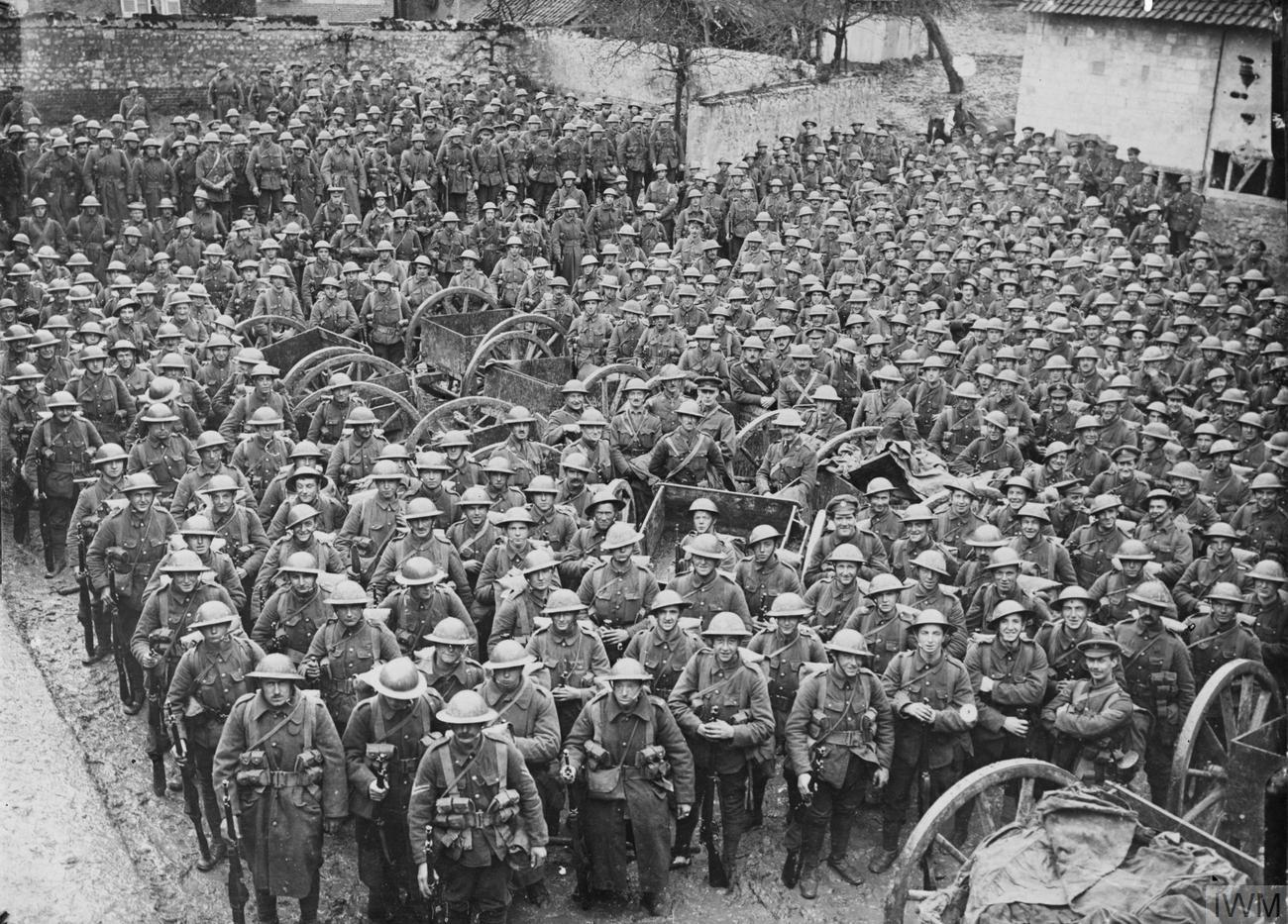
Men of the Loyal North Lancashires (believed to be 1/4th Bn) of 55th (West Yorkshire) Division before the Battle of the Somme.

At the beginning of 1916 the West Lancashire Division was reformed in France as the 55th (West Lancashire) Division and the 1/4th Loyals returned to it with 154 Bde (now redesignated 164th (North Lancashire) Brigade). The division reformed on 3 January at Hallencourt near Abbeville, and in February it relieved a French division in the line south of Arras. During the early summer the division carried out a number of trench rais to divert attention from the Somme sector where a great offensive was being prepared. 1/4th Loyals established a specialist raiding party of 60 men under Capt E.M. Gregson. On 28 June the division laid on an elaborate daylight raid in which six battalions including 1/4th Loyals took part, with gas and smoke discharged on a two-mile frontage. Unfortunately shift in the wind made the gas and smoke only partially successful and some raiders did not get into the enemy lines. The 1/4th Loyals' party, yelling 'On the Kellys', was successful, but lost 10 killed (including Capt Gregson) and 19 wounded.

==== Somme ====
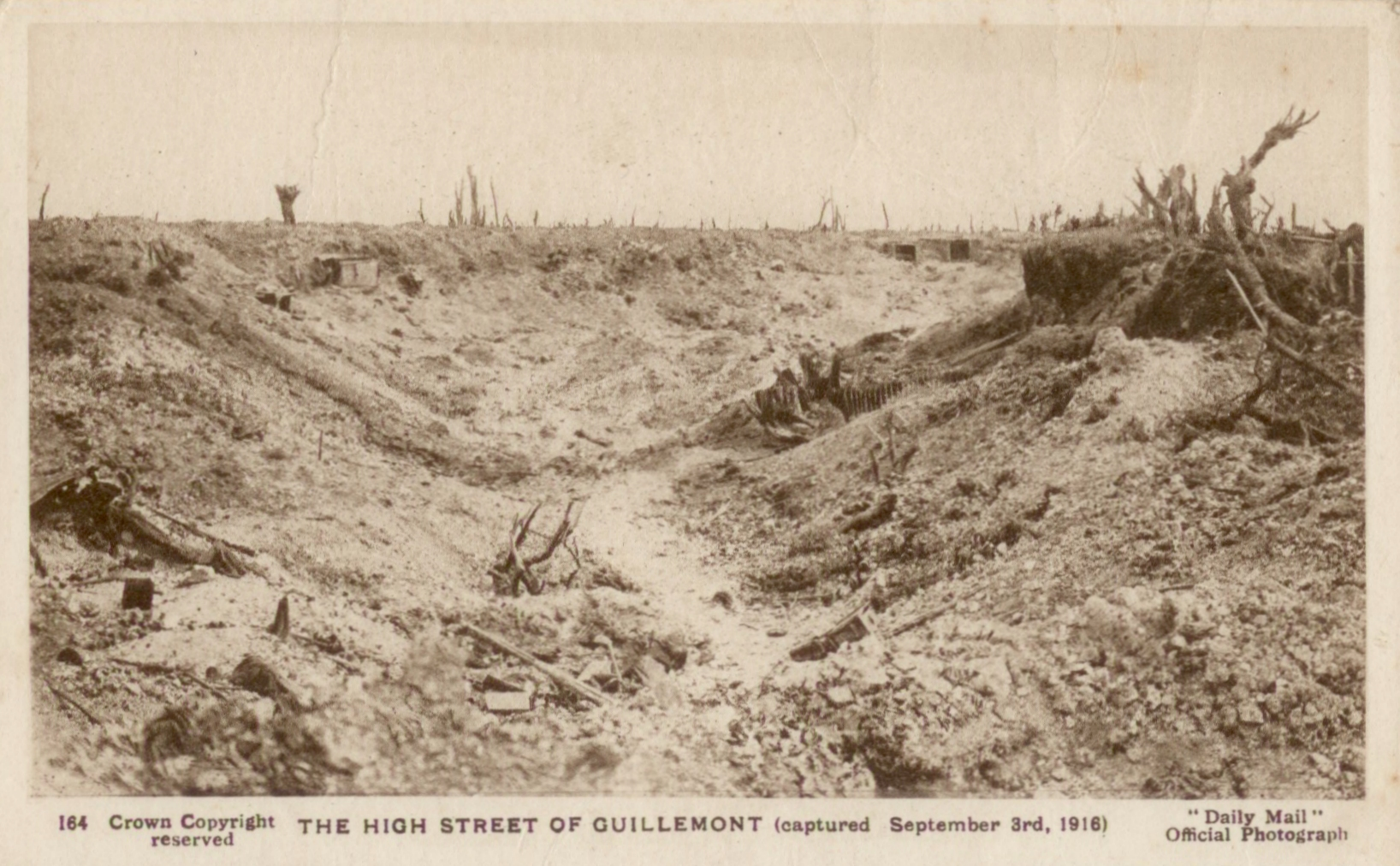
The High Street of Guillemont, 1916

On 25 July, the 55th Division was relieved and travelled south to join in the Somme offensive. It moved into the line opposite Guillemont on 30 July and prepared to attack on 8 August. 164th Brigade on the left was to attack Guillemont village with two battalions assisted by two companies of 1/4th Loyals, then the remaining two companies of 1/4th Loyals were to follow up and occupy the German front line. On each of the two days before the attack, D Company attempted to seize an enemy-held ridge 150 yards in front of the division's start-line, but failed. The attack (the Battle of Guillemont) was not a success. The only progress was on the left where 1/8th Bn Liverpool Regiment (the Liverpool Irish) went through the village and D Company 1/4th Loyals moved up to consolidate the gains. However the enemy got between them and the Liverpool Irish, forcing D Company to retire. The support companies were not engaged, but still suffered heavy casualties from artillery fire. The battalion had to be brought up to strength with a draft of over 200 men from the Manchester Regiment and the East Lancashire Regiment.

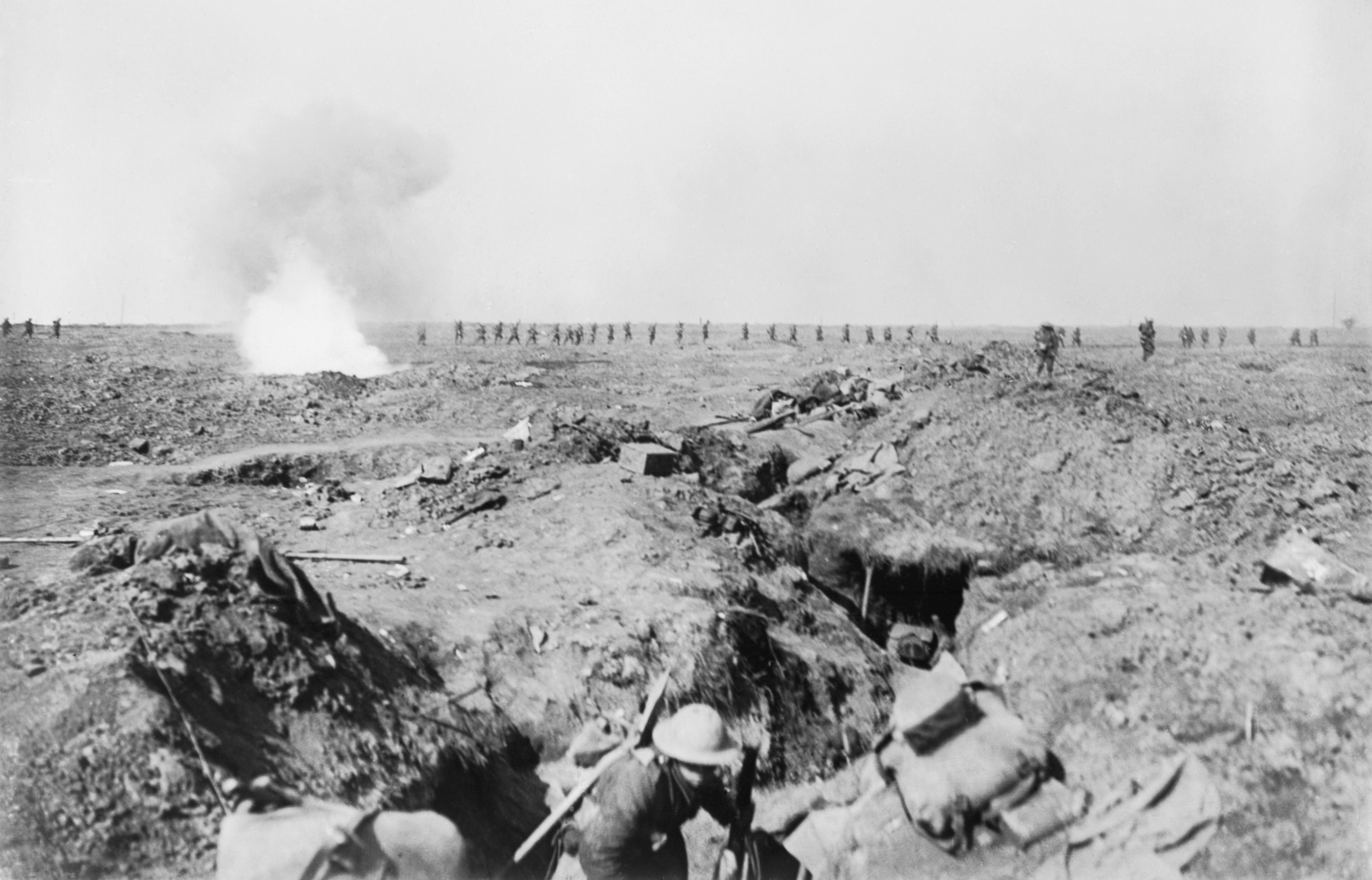
British troops advancing at the Battle of Ginchy, 9 September 1916.

After rest, the division moved back into the line on the night of 4/5 September to prepare for the Battle of Ginchy. The attack was made on the afternoon of 9 September behind a creeping barrage, and at Zero hour (17.25) B and C companies of 1/4th Loyals left their trenches and followed the barrage towards the first objective, a trench called Hop Alley. Unfortunately, Hop Alley was held more strongly than anticipated, with several machine guns, and an unknown trench (later called Haymarket) caused confusion and delay. If indeed the Loyals reached Hop Alley, they were unable to hold it. Casualties were again heavy and the battalion was withdrawn into reserve.

When 164th Bde attacked Gueudecourt on 27 September during the Battle of Flers–Courcelette, 1/4th Loyals was in support and suffered few casualties. Afterwards the division left the Somme and moved north to the Ypres Salient until the end of the year. During 1916, 1/4th Loyals had lost 35 officers and 593 other ranks killed, wounded and missing.

==== Pilckem Ridge ====
The battalion remained in the salient during the early months of 1917, carrying out diversionary activities during the Battle of Messines. 55th Division was then involved on the opening day of the Third Ypres Offensive (the Battle of Pilckem Ridge on 31 July). The divisional attack was to be in three stages, with 164th Bde passing through the leading brigades to take the third objective, the Gheluvelt–Langemarck Line. When the 164th was ordered forward, the 1/4th Loyals and 2/5th Lancashire Fusiliers leading, the enemy was still holding part of the second objective and casualties were heavy before the third objective was reached about 11.40. Although the Loyals captured all their objectives, including five batteries of 7.7 cm field guns, the Germans counter-attacked at 14.35 once the protective artillery barrage had ended and before the line could be consolidated. The brigade was forced to fall back to the second objective. Casualties among 1/4th Loyals had been heavy: 51 all ranks killed or died of wounds, 192 wounded and 71 missing. Of 22 officers who went into action only four were uninjured. The division was withdrawn for rest and retraining at St Omer.

==== Menin Road ====
55th Division returned to the line for the Battle of the Menin Road Ridge, starting on 20 September). The objective was essentially the same as the third objective of 31 July. The creeping barrage began at 05.45 with 164th Bde as the front right brigade. 1/4th Loyals followed 1/4th King's Own, who were slightly held up by the counter-barrage, so that they Loyals caught up with them and were engaged earlier than anticipated. The battalion suffered heavy casualties from a strongpoint at Aisne Farm that the King's Own had bypassed, and then got involved in clearing Gallipoli Farm. The two battalions were now too weak to push on from the intermediate objective, and the supporting battalion (1/5th King's Own) was brought up to deal with counter-attacks, but overall the division's attack had been a success. 1/4th Loyals' losses amounted to 31 killed, 176 wounded and 11 missing.

==== Cambrai ====
The division now moved south to recuperate in the Somme sector, but on 18 November the 1/4th Loyals were near Guillemont Farm when the enemy opened a hurricane bombardment and attacked. The advanced posts were overrun and the enemy got into the battalion's lines before being driven out, the Loyals' casualties amounting to 80. The battalion was not involved in the brigade's attack on Guillemont farm on 20 September, which was a diversion to assist the British attack at Cambrai.

On 28 November there were indications that the enemy intended to attack newly won ground at Cambrai, and the 1/4th Loyals were brought up from reserve to Vaucellette Farm to be ready to counter-attack and ensure that the Villers Ghislain Spur was held. The German attack came on 30 November and made rapid progress. 1/5th Loyals made a stand and suffered heavy casualties, but an immediate counter-attack by 1/4th Loyals coming from reserve saved the situation. Villers Ghislain was retaken, but German pressure all along the line was intense, and eventually the battalion fell back and dug in at Vaucellette Farm. The battalion received praise from the Corps commander downwards for its actions. By the time it was relieved on 1 December the battalion had suffered 14 killed (including the CO, Lt-Col Hindle), 92 wounded and 15 missing.

==== Estaires ====
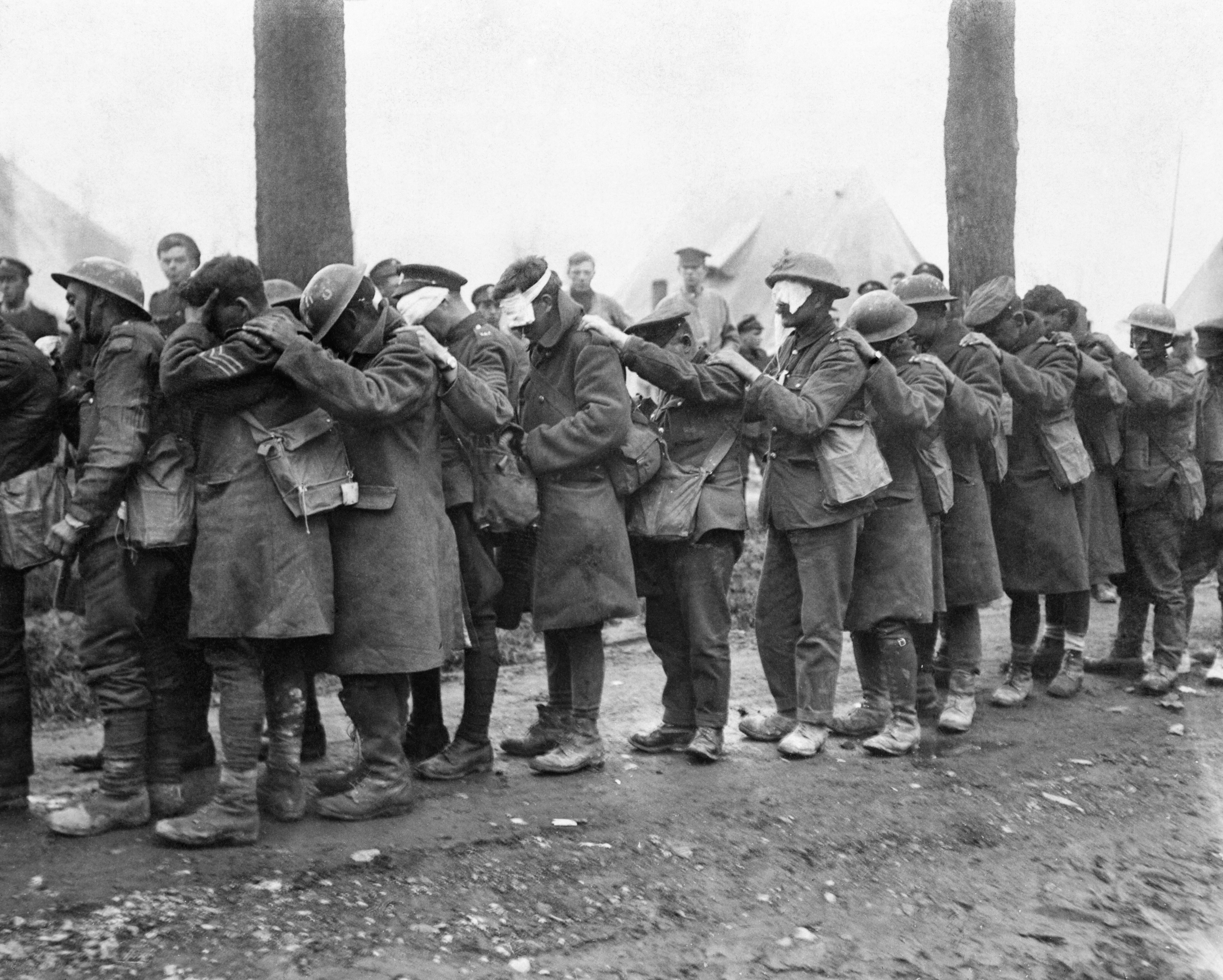
Troops of 55th (West Lancashire) Division blinded by gas during the Battle of Estaires, 10 April 1918.

The German spring offensive opened on 21 March 1918. In its early weeks the 55th Division was not directly engaged but 164th Bde as divisional reserve was constantly moved from place to place in case of attacks. When the second phase of the German offensive began on 9 April (the Battle of Estaires) the brigade was holding the line from the La Bassée Canal to north of Givenchy, with 1/4th Loyals on the left. The attack was helped by morning mist and the Germans penetrated the front line. Soon the strongpoints at Moat Farm and Givenchy Church were surrounded, and some Germans even entered battalion HQ, but the situation was quickly restored. The lost ground was recaptured and by nightfall the battalion was back in all its original positions. This was the case throughout the 55th Division's front, despite a German breakthrough to its left. The battalion's losses were 44 killed, 104 wounded and 52 missing.

After a short rest, 55th Division was back in the Givenchy defences by late April. On 14 May, A Company of 1/4th Loyals raided a German trench known as Willow Drain, but suffered serious casualties from a counter-attack. The sector remained static, though with frequent bombardments and raids, until September. The battalion was not engaged in 164th Bde's surprise attack on the Capture of Givenchy Craters on 24 August, and only provided carrying parties when the division captured Canteleux Trench (17 September).

==== The Hundred Days ====
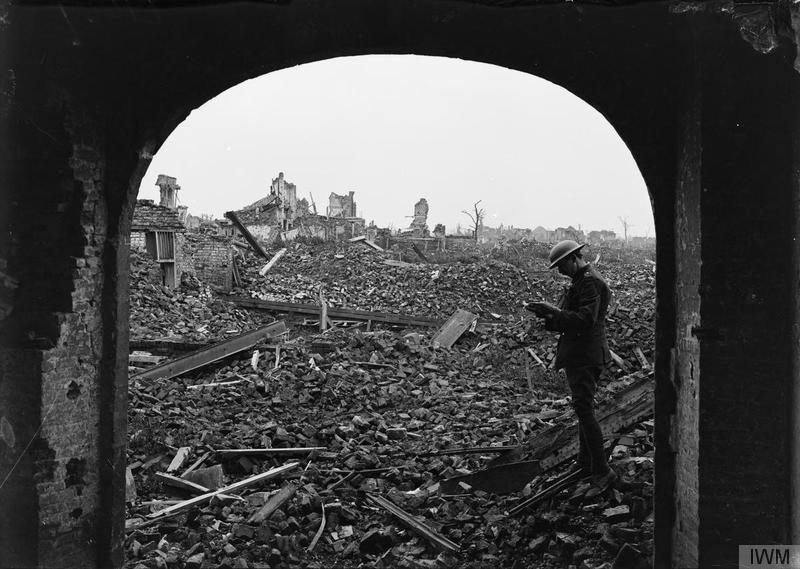
Ruins of La Bassée after its capture, October 1918.

By the end of September the Allied successes elsewhere in the Hundred Days Offensive meant that the Germans were preparing to retreat from in front of 55th Division. On 30 September two companies of 1/4th Loyals attacked strongpoints south of the La Bassée Canal. At first the attack was successful, but the neighbouring division failed, and a powerful counter-attack threw the Loyals back to their starting point. The battalion repeated the attack next day, and this time held all the objectives. On 2 October the Germans began to retire and 55th Division pressed forward and occupied La Bassée the same day. It then participated in the pursuit to the Haute Deûle Canal.

On 16 October, D Company and half of B Company of 1/4th Loyals crossed the Haute Deûle Canal and advanced to attack a strongly-held bridgehead supported by A and C Companies. Having taken the bridgehead the battalion pushed patrols forward to the Seclin Canal. Once this had been bridge, other troops continued the pursuit. On 19 October the battalion took up the pursuit again, seizing four villages.

The pursuit was not easy: on 21 October the division pushed forward against considerable opposition to a position overlooking Tournai. The following day the 1/4th Loyals, after a bombardment, seized a small wood at the western end of the Faubourg St Martin suburb. The battalion was driven out at 02.00 on 23 October, re-took the wood, and was then driven out again by shelling and gas.

On 30 October the battalion was withdrawn for rest and did not advance again until 9 November. It was at Villars St Armand, some miles in the rear on 11 November when the Armistice with Germany came into force at 11.00. 55th Division had advanced 50 miles in 80 days. From 9 October to 11 November, 1/4th Loyals lost 19 killed, 77 wounded and 46 missing. During its whole service on the Western Front from 3 January 1916 to 11 November 1918, 1/4th Loyals' casualties totalled 31 officers and 386 other ranks killed, 79 officers and 2009 ORs wounded, 13 officers and 310 ORs missing.

After the armistice the division was chiefly engaged on railway reconstruction and road repair in the Leuze-en-Hainaut area. In mid-December it moved to Brussels and began educational work to prepare the men for demobilisation. The battalions began to dwindle in January 1919 as men went home, and the last cadres left in April. The 1/4th Loyals was disembodied on 13 June 1919.

==== Commanding officers ====
The following commanded the 1/4th Bn during the First World War:

- Lt-Col R. Hindle, DSO (killed 30 November 1917)
- Lt-Col J.A. Crump, DSO
- Lt-Col T.C. Williams, DSO, MC

=== 2/4th Loyals ===
The battalion was formed at Preston in October 1914 and was assigned to the 2/1st North Lancashire Bde in the 2nd West Lancashire Division, which were designated 170th Bde and 57th (2nd West Lancashire) Division respectively in August 1915. A serious shortage of equipment hampered the training of the 2nd Line TF units and the only weapons available were .256-in Japanese Ariska rifles.

In September 1915 the 57th Division assembled round Canterbury in Kent, with the 2/4th Loyals at Ashford. Serious training could now begin, and Lee-Enfield service rifles were issued in November (though these were not in good condition). Lewis guns arrived towards the end of February 1916. In July the division was moved to Aldershot Command and the 2/4th Loyals went to Blackdown Camp.

==== In the line ====
In January 1917 the division was deemed fit for service and crossed to France, the 2/4th Loyals landing at Le Havre on 8 February 1917. The division joined II ANZAC Corps and the battalion was introduced to trench warfare at Sailly-sur-la-Lys by 1st Bn New Zealand Rifle Brigade. It took over its sector of the front line on 17 February. The sector was considered a quiet one, but twice during March the battalion drove off German raids, and also suffered casualties in its own attempts at trench raids, as well as from sickness.

In May, the 2/4th and 2/5th Loyals were detached from 57th Division to hold a section of line anchored on the River Lys under 3rd Australian Division. Here they were heavily shelled throughout the 10-day detachment. D Company 2/4th Loyals carried out a large and successful trench raid on the night of 28/29 July.

==== Passchendaele ====
In mid-September 57th Division was withdrawn from the line and underwent a month's training before moving to the Ypres Salient to participate in the Second Battle of Passchendaele. At 05.40 on 26 October 170th Bde attacked through appalling mud with three companies of 2/4th Loyals in the centre. The Mendling and Rubens Farm positions were quickly taken with relatively few casualties, but the centre of the attack was then held up by enemy pillboxes. Once the support battalion (2/5th King's Own) came up, the Loyals took the pillboxes and reached some dominating ground ahead. Further advance was impossible because of enemy machine guns over the rise, but the battalion held its ground until relieved that night. In its first major action it had suffered 61 killed or died of wounds, 259 wounded and 38 missing.

==== Scarpe ====
By January 1918 the battalion was very weak in numbers, but it was brought up to strength in February. The division remained in quiet sectors during the German Spring Offensive until in late August it moved to the Arras sector to take part in the Battle of the Scarpe. The battalion attacked at 13.00 on 29 August, and took its first objective, the Hendecourt–Bullecourt road, without an artillery barrage and with its left flank unprotected, and then moved on to Greyhound Trench. It had taken all its objectives by 14.00 and held off a German counter-attack that night, though later had to withdraw a little because the battalion to its right fell back. The battalion was then in support until mid-September.

==== Canal du Nord ====
On 27 September the 57th Division forced the line of the Canal du Nord. 170th Brigade's attack was led by the 1/5th Bn Loyals, with two companies of 2/4th Loyals in support for mopping-up and then defending the captured ground. Over the next four days of continuous fighting, the battalion's four companies were split up, assisting any unit in need to fill gaps, fight off counter-attacks, and consolidate ground won. On the afternoon of 1 October, A Company took part in a minor operation with 2/5th Bn to take 'Z' Trench, but failure by a neighbouring unit left A Company isolated. On the night of 2 October a man of A Company swam back across the St. Quentin Canal to report that the company was still holding out but the enemy were behind Z Trench. Attempts to get in touch with the company failed, and on the afternoon of 3 October B and D Companies attempted an attack covered by trench mortars, but only made 300 yards and were halted by machine gun fire with heavy casualties. On 4 October the survivors of A Company made it back to regain touch with the battalion.

The battalion was withdrawn for rest until 21 October, when it rejoined the 57th Division. The division was now advancing quickly. On 22 October, strong patrols of the 2/4th Loyals and 2/5th King's Own got across the Scheldt by rafts and a barrel-pier bridge at Pont à Chin at Froyennes, but although reinforced by a Loyals company, the ground was too muddy to dig in, so the troops returned to the west bank.

On 1 November the division handed over its part of the line and went into rest billets in Lille. It was still resting when the Armistice brought hostilities to a close. It was assigned to clearing and evacuating stores in the Arras area, where demobilisation began in January 1919. On 1 April the battalion was reduced to a cadre and this group sailed for home on 6 June. It was disbanded at Fovant on 14 June.

==== Commanding Officer ====
On landing in France in January 1917 the battalion was commanded by Lt-Col the Hon Robert Lygon, MVO (son of Frederick Lygon, 6th Earl Beauchamp), of the Grenadier Guards.

=== 3/4th Loyals ===
This battalion was formed at Preston on 10 May 1915 from a nucleus provided by the 2/4th Bn and assembled on 1 June 1915 at Weeton Camp, near Kirkham, Lancashire. Recruits were received from HQ at Avenham Lane, Preston, for training, together with men of the service battalions returning from hospital. The 3/4th Bn sent its first draft to the Western Front in September 1915. At the end of the year the battalion moved into winter billets in the Blackpool area, then in early 1916 it moved into huts at Park Hall Camp at Oswestry, where all the 3rd Line units of the West Lancashire Division were concentrated.

It became the 4th Reserve Bn on 8 April 1916 and absorbed the 5th and 12th Reserve Bns of the Loyals on 1 September 1916. It formed part of the West Lancashire Reserve Brigade, training drafts until the end of the war. In April 1918 it moved to Dublin, Ireland, at first under canvas in Phoenix Park, later in Wellington Barracks, until it was disbanded on 5 July 1919.

=== 14th Loyals ===
The men of the TF who had not signed up for overseas service were separated from their units in 1915 and formed into Provisional Battalions for coast defence. The home service men of the 4th, 5th, and 12th Loyals formed the 42nd Provisional Battalion at Herne Bay, Kent, on 1 September 1915 and joined 9th Provisional Brigade, later in 218th Brigade in 73rd Division at Witham in Essex.

The Home Service men continued in home defence until 1916, when the Military Service Act swept away the Home/Overseas service distinction and the provisional battalions took on the dual role of home defence and physical conditioning to render men fit for drafting overseas. The 42nd Provisional Battalion officially became the 14th Bn Loyals (TF) at Broadstairs on 1 January 1917. The battalion never served overseas, and as the men were drafted away it was disbanded on 15 December 1917 at Witham.

== Interwar ==
The TF was reconstituted on 7 February 1920 and the 4th Bn was reformed at Preston. 55th (West Lancashire) Division began to reform in April 1920 as part of Western Command. The 4th Loyals were once again in 164th (North Lancashire) Brigade. The TF was reorganised as the Territorial Army (TA) in 1921.

In the 1930s the increasing need for anti-aircraft (AA) defence for Britain's cities was addressed by converting a number of TA infantry battalions into searchlight (S/L) regiments. The 4th Loyals was one unit selected for this role, becoming 62nd (4th Bn The Loyal (North Lancashire) Regiment) Searchlight Regiment in 1938. It consisted of HQ and three S/L batteries (435, 436 and 437) at The Drill Hall, Stanley Street in Preston, and was attached to the Royal Artillery while remaining part of the Loyals. The regiment was assigned to 33rd (Western) Anti-Aircraft Brigade of 4th AA Division. This brigade was responsible for the air defence of Liverpool and West Lancashire.

== Second World War ==
=== Mobilisation ===
The TA's AA units were mobilised on 23 September 1938 during the Munich Crisis, with units manning their emergency positions within 24 hours, even though many did not yet have their full complement of men or equipment. The emergency lasted three weeks, and they were stood down on 13 October. In February 1939 the existing AA defences came under the control of a new Anti-Aircraft Command. In June a partial mobilisation of TA units was begun in a process known as 'couverture', whereby each AA unit did a month's tour of duty in rotation to man selected AA and searchlight positions. On 24 August, ahead of the declaration of war, AA Command was fully mobilised at its war stations.

62nd (4th Loyals) Searchlight Rgt mobilised in 33 AA Bde of 4th AA Division, but soon afterwards transferred to the newly formed 53rd Light AA Bde, which controlled all the S/L units in 4th AA Division. On 1 August 1940 all the infantry battalions converted into AA units formally became part of the Royal Artillery. 62nd S/L Rgt sent a cadre of experienced officers and men to 237th S/L Training Rgt at Holywood, County Down, where they were to form a new 566 S/L Bty on 17 April 1941, but this was cancelled.

=== The Blitz ===
During The Blitz from autumn 1940 to May 1941 the North-Western cities of Manchester and Liverpool were badly bombed and the North Midlands cities of Nottingham and Derby were also attacked. 62nd Searchlight Regiment was on duty in 53rd Light AA Bde throughout this period.

In 1941 the searchlight layout over the Midlands was reorganised, so that any hostile raid approaching the Gun Defended Areas (GDA) around the cities must cross more than one searchlight belt, and then within the GDAs the concentration of lights was increased.

The regiment stayed with 53rd Light AA Bde until after AA Command was reorganised in the autumn of 1942, when 4th AA Division was replaced by 4 AA Group. 62nd Searchlight Rgt moved to 50th AA Bde (covering Nottingham and Derby) in December 1942. Then in early 1943 it moved again, to 69th AA Bde in 3 AA Group covering South West England and Wales.

=== 150th LAA Regiment ===
In late 1942 AA Command had begun a process of converting S/L units into Light AA (LAA) gun units, primarily equipped with the Bofors 40 mm gun. 62nd Searchlight Regiment was one of those selected for conversion, becoming 150th (Loyals) Light Anti-Aircraft Regiment, RA on 7 April 1943. Regimental HQ, 435 and 436 SL Btys converted at Downpatrick, Northern Ireland (the batteries becoming 504 and 505 LAA Btys), while 437 S/L Bty was converted into 506 LAA Bty at Deepcut Barracks. The new unit was designated as a 'Base & Port Defences' unit and was assigned to 21st Army Group, which was being assembled for the planned invasion of Europe (Operation Overlord).

On 5 July 1943, having completed training, 150th LAA Rgt under the command of Lt-Col S.C. Guillan, TD, joined 103 AA Bde in Cornwall. The brigade was a component of the Field Force while retaining defence commitments under AA Command.

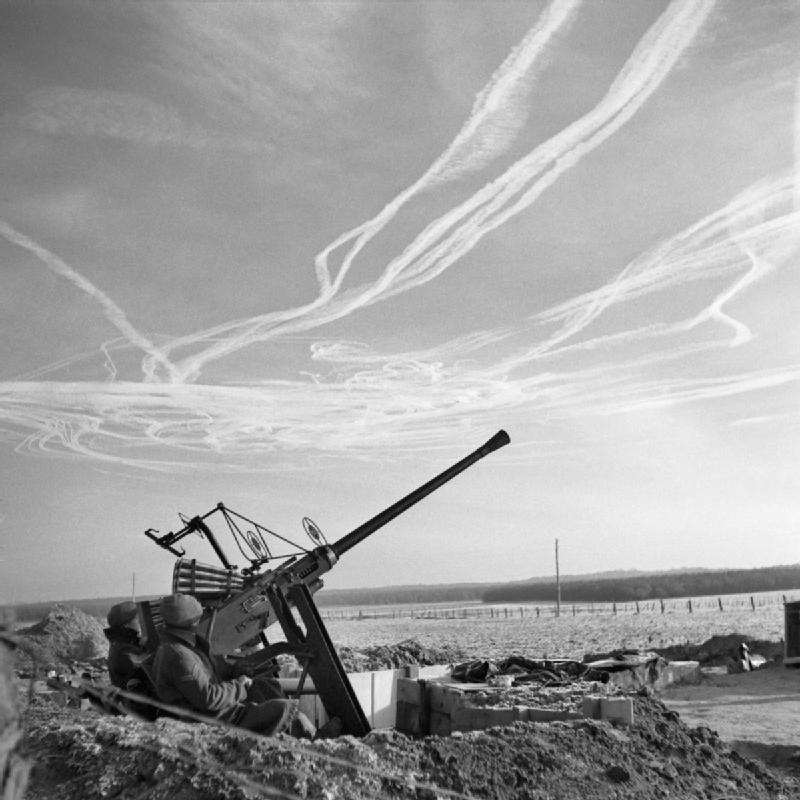
A Bofors gun crew in NW Europe during the winter of 1944–45.

The regiment deployed as follows:

- RHQ at Camborne
- 504 LAA Bty at St Ives
  - A Trp at St Ives
  - B & C Trps at Hayle
- 505 LAA Bty at Falmouth
  - D, E & F Trps at Falmouth
- 506 LAA Bty at Penzance
  - G & H Trps at Penzance
- I Trp at Marazion

The regiment was relieved in September 1943 and moved to Leeds.

On 2 March 1944 the 150th became the divisional LAA regiment for 9th Armoured Division, but the division never went overseas and was disbanded at the end of July 1944. The regiment transferred to 55th (West Lancashire) Infantry Division, but that too remained in the UK throughout the war. Between 1 September and 28 November 1944 504 and 505 LAA Btys were acting independently. On 24 February 1945 the regiment left the UK and rejoined 21st Army Group fighting in North West Europe. It ended the war serving in 50th AA Bde in the defence of Antwerp against V-1 flying bombs ('Divers').

150th (Loyals) Light Anti-Aircraft Regiment RA [/b]

Arrival at Cuxhaven from the Westertimke camp south of Bremervörde on 30 October 1945.

Disbanded on 20 February 1946. (Source:https://bfg-locations.editboard.com/t2716-cuxhaven-op-backfire#39832)

The regiment was ordered into suspended animation in British Army of the Rhine on 4 February 1946, completing the process by 22 February.

== Postwar ==
When the TA was reconstituted on 1 January 1947, the regiment was reformed at Kimberley Barracks, Preston as 597 (The Loyal) Light Anti-Aircraft/Searchlight Regiment, RA, forming part of Preston-based 93 (AA) Army Group Royal Artillery.

On 1 September 1950 the regiment was absorbed into 337 (2nd West Lancashire) Heavy AA Regiment, RA, forming R (Loyal) Bty. This battery disappeared in 1955 when there was a further round of amalgamations.

== Insignia ==
On 30 March 1916, units of 55th (1st West Lancashire) Division were ordered to adopt distinguishing cloth badges just below the collar on the back of the service dress jacket. 1/4th Loyals wore a square in red (164th Bde's colour).

== Honorary Colonels ==
The following officers served as Honorary Colonel of the unit:

- Edward Bootle-Wilbraham, Lord Skelmersdale (later Earl of Lathom), appointed to 11th RVC on 9 November 1872
- Edward Stanley, 17th Earl of Derby appointed 18 June 1909 (concurrently Hon Col of the 5th Bn Loyals from 1899)

== External sources ==
- Mark Conrad, The British Army, 1914 (archive site)
- British Army units from 1945 on
- British Military History
- Great War Centenary Drill Halls.
- Great War Forum
- Lancashire Infantry Museum
- Lancashire Record Office, Handlist 72
- The Long, Long Trail
- The Loyal North Lancashire Regiment 1914–1918
- Orders of Battle at Patriot Files
- The Regimental Warpath 1914–1918 (archive site)
- Royal Artillery 1939–1945
- Graham Watson, The Territorial Army 1947
