= Gerald Boyd (British Army officer) =

British Army general (1877–1930)

Major-General Sir Gerald Boyd KCB CMG DSO DCM
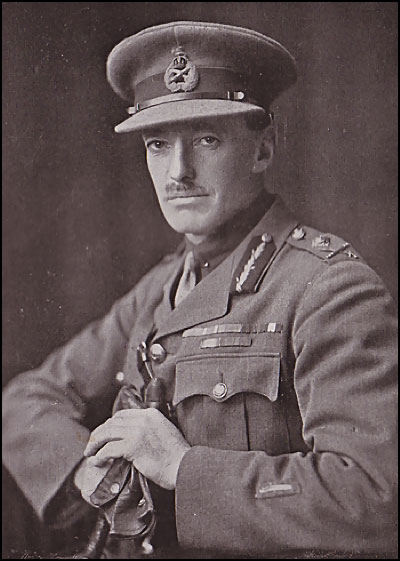
- Born: 19 November 1877; London, England
- Died: 12 April 1930 (aged 52); London, England
- Burial place: Putney Vale Cemetery, London
- Military career
- Allegiance: United Kingdom
- Branch: British Army
- Service years: 1895–1930
- Rank: Major-General
- Units: Devonshire Regiment; East Yorkshire Regiment
- Commands: Staff College, Quetta; Dublin District; 46th (North Midland) Division; 170th (2/1st North Lancashire) Brigade
- Conflicts: Second Boer War; First World War
- Awards: Knight Commander of the Order of the Bath; Companion of the Order of St Michael and St George; Distinguished Service Order; Distinguished Conduct Medal; Mentioned in Despatches

Major-General Sir Gerald Farrell Boyd, KCB, CMG, DSO, DCM (19 November 1877 – 12 April 1930) was a senior British Army officer who served as Military Secretary from 1927 to 1930.

== Military career ==
Educated at St Paul's School, Boyd enlisted in the Devonshire Regiment in 1895. He fought in the Second Boer War of 1899–1902 and took part in the Relief of Ladysmith, including the actions at Colenso, and the operations in the Orange River Colony, including the action at Wittebergen. During the war, he was commissioned into the 2nd Battalion, East Yorkshire Regiment in May 1900 and promoted to lieutenant on 26 April 1902. He was mentioned in despatches three times (including 25 April 1902), received the Queen's South Africa Medal, and was appointed a Companion of the Distinguished Service Order (DSO) for his war service. The battalion stayed in South Africa throughout the war, and he returned home on the SS Orotava in December 1902, when they were stationed at Aldershot.

He went on to be brigade major of the 4th Division's 11th Infantry Brigade in September 1912.

Boyd served in the First World War, which began in the summer of 1914, with the 11th Infantry Brigade, commanded by Brigadier General Aylmer Hunter-Weston, as part of the British Expeditionary Force (BEF), which was sent to the Western Front. In February 1915 he became a general staff officer, grade 2 (GSO2) of the 1st Division, and was promoted in March to major, when he transferred to the Royal Irish Regiment and was advanced to the brevet rank of lieutenant colonel, "for distinguished service in the field," that same month. In July, he took over the position of general staff officer, grade 1 (GSO1) of the 6th Division, in succession to Lieutenant Colonel John Shea. In June 1916, he was promoted to the temporary rank of brigadier general and served as the general staff of V Corps. He was promoted to brevet colonel, "for distinguished service in the field," in January 1917. He was made commander of the 170th Infantry Brigade in France in July 1918 and, after being promoted to the temporary rank of major general in September, was made general officer commanding (GOC) of the 46th (North Midland) Division. He led the 46th Division when it stormed the Hindenburg Line at Bellenglise during the Battle of St Quentin Canal.

After the war Boyd was made a brigadier general on the general staff at general headquarters of British Army on the Rhine and then, after being promoted to substantive major general in June 1919, became colonel of the Leinster Regiment in October and then GOC Dublin District in Ireland in 1920.

He was appointed commandant of the Staff College, Quetta, in India, in January 1923 and, after being appointed colonel of the East Yorkshire Regiment in December 1925, relinquished this assignment in January 1927. He was then the military secretary in the UK in March 1927.

He died of cerebral spinal fever in 1930, at the age of 52.

== Family ==
In 1913, Boyd married Grace Sophia Burdett, and they went on to have two sons.

Military offices
Preceded by William Thwaites	GOC 46th (North Midland) Division; 1918–1919	Succeeded by Sir Reginald Hoskins
Preceded by Louis Vaughan	Commandant of the Staff College, Quetta; 1923–1927	Succeeded by C. A. C. Goodwin
Honorary titles
Preceded by Francis Seymour Inglefield	Colonel of the East Yorkshire Regiment; 1925–1930	Succeeded by Henry Haggard
Military offices
Preceded by Sir David Campbell	Military Secretary; 1927–1930	Succeeded by Sir Sidney Clive
