= Loyal Regiment (North Lancashire) =

Loyal North Lancashire Regiment Loyal Regiment (North Lancashire)
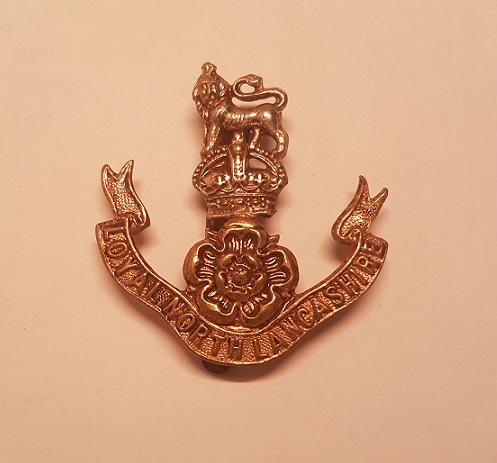
- Cap badge of the Loyal North Lancashire Regiment
- Active: 1 July 1881 – 1 September 1970
- Country: United Kingdom
- Branch: British Army
- Type: Infantry
- Role: Line infantry
- Size: 1–2 Regular battalions 1 Militia and Special Reserve battalion 2 Territorial and Volunteer battalions Up to 16 Hostilities-only battalions
- Garrison/HQ: Fulwood Barracks, Preston, Lancashire
- Nicknames: Cauliflowers, the Lancashire Lads, and Wolfe's Own
- Mottos: Loyauté M'Oblige (Loyalty Binds Me)
- Colors: Scarlet with White Facings
- Anniversaries: 15 February (Kimberley); 4 July (Maida); 31 December (Tarifa)
- Engagements: Second Boer War; First World War; Second World War

The Loyal Regiment (North Lancashire) (until 1921 known as the Loyal North Lancashire Regiment) was a line infantry regiment of the British Army that was in existence from 1881 to 1970. In 1970, the regiment was amalgamated with the Lancashire Regiment to form the Queen's Lancashire Regiment which was, in 2006, amalgamated with the King's Own Royal Border Regiment and the King's Regiment (Manchester and Liverpool) to form the Duke of Lancaster Regiment (King's, Lancashire and Border).

== History ==
=== Formation ===
The Loyal North Lancashire Regiment was formed as part of the Childers Reforms of 1881 by the amalgamation of the 47th (Lancashire) Regiment of Foot, 81st Regiment of Foot (Loyal Lincoln Volunteers), 3rd Royal Lancashire Militia (The Duke of Lancaster's Own) and the 11th and 14th Lancashire Rifle Volunteer Corps. The Loyals were one of seven county regiments recruiting in Lancashire. The depot was at Preston, and the regimental district also included the towns of Bolton, Chorley, Farnworth, Hindley, and the Isle of Man. As part of the Cardwell Reforms, the 47th and 81st regiments were linked. The depot for the linked regiment was Fulwood Barracks at Preston. Beginning in 1873, the regiments which would eventually be re-designated as the Loyal North Lancashire Regiment were brigaded together and began moving their depots to Fulwood. However, it would not be until 1877 that the moves were completed when the required facilities were completed.

The barracks themselves had been completed in 1848 and served as the station for a number of units between 1848 and 1881. Notably, in the 1860s, it was occupied by the 11th Depot Battalion, which served as depot unit for 11th Hussars and of the 1st/10th, 2nd/10th, 1st/11th, 32nd, 41st and 55th Regiments of Foot. In 1861, Pte Patrick McCaffery, a 19-year-old private soldier with the 32nd (Cornwall) Regiment of Foot shot and killed the Depot's commander, Colonel Hugh Crofton, and Depot's adjutant, Captain John Hanham, with a single shot. The incident began over McCaffery's punishment for failing to vigorously pursue an investigation into some children who had broken some windows at the barracks. McCaffery was tried and convicted at the Liverpool Assizes. He was executed on 11 January 1862. It is claimed that his ghost haunts the officer's mess at Fulwood barracks.

=== Boer War, 1899–1902 ===
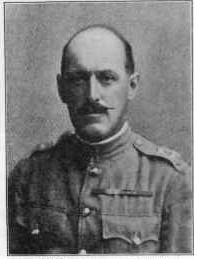
Robert Kekewich

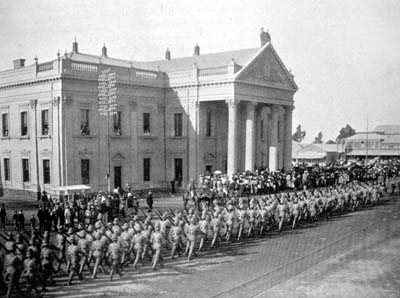
Loyal North Lancashires marching in Kimberly

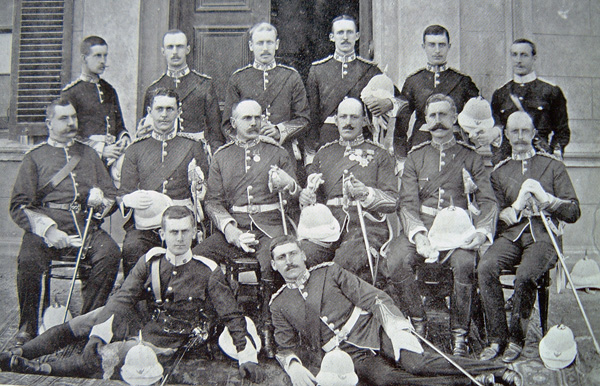
Officers of the 1st Battalion, Loyal North Lancashire Regiment, c. 1899

In 1899, the Loyal Regiment found itself assigned to South Africa. With hostilities seeming likely in the aftermath of the Jameson Raid, the De Beers company became increasingly concerned with the security of its operations in Kimberly. Although a town guard and other volunteer formations had been raised, the De Beers company and citizens of Kimberly petitioned for additional security measures. On 7 October 1899, an artillery battery and four companies of the Loyal North Lancashire Regiment were dispatched to secure the town under the command of Lieutenant-Colonel Robert Kekewich. Five days later, with the start of hostilities, Boer forces arrived and began to beisolate Kimberley. For the next 126 days, the North Lancs and the local militias would be cut off and subjected to regular shelling from the Boer artillery. The siege was finally lifted when Brigadier-General Sir John French's Cavalry Division was able to break through the Boer lines on 15 February 1900.

With its commander and four of its companies under siege in Kimberly, the balance of the 1st Battalion served with Lord Methuen. Together with the 1st Northumberland Fusiliers, 2nd Northampton Regiment, and 2nd King's Own (Yorkshire Light Infantry), they formed the 9th Brigade of the 1st Division. They served with 9th Brigade at the Battles of Belmont, Modder River and Magersfotein.

Following the relief of Kimberly in February 1900, the reunited battalion would remain a part of Methuen's command until July, when it was detached to guard Oliphant's Nek. However, on 8 August, they abandoned this task at the orders of Colonel Baden-Powell and left the area unguarded. This allowed Christiaan de Wet to escape the British forces attempting to catch him. Although the Boer escaped, it was ruled that orders received by the Loyals were to blame, and the regiment escaped censure.

The end of 1900 found 1st Loyals back with the 9th Brigade. As part of the brigade, they took part in actions around Klerksdorp. Remaining under Lord Methuen's command for the rest of the war, the Loyals provided men to be formed into mounted infantry companies as the war shifted from large engagements into a guerrilla war. The Loyals would continue to serve throughout the guerrilla phase, engaging Boer commandos on a number of occasions until the end of the war with the signing of the Treaty of Vereeniging on 31 May 1902. Following the end of hostilities, 525 officers and men of the battalion left Cape Town in the SS Carisbrook Castle in September 1902, arriving at Southampton early the following month.

The 3rd Battalion was among the first militia units to be embodied for full-time duty, on 13 December 1899, and went to Kent for pre-deployment training at Shorncliffe and Lydd. It then embarked on 12 January 1900 and sailed to Malta to relieve a regular army battalion in the garrison there. A year later the manpower needs of the guerrilla war in South Africa led to the battalion re-embarking from Malta on 2 March 1901. It arrived in South Africa on 30 March and was employed on the lines of communication from Port Elizabeth to Aliwal North. The battalion embarked for home on 13 February 1902 and was disembodied on 15 March.

=== Early 20th century ===
The 2nd Battalion had been stationed in the United Kingdom after the amalgamation in 1881, serving in England to 1887, at Jersey 1887-1890, in Ireland 1890-1896, and again in England until 1899. From 1899 there were postings in the Mediterranean, at Malta until 1901, followed by a year at Crete, and from May 1902 at Gibraltar. In 1908, the Volunteers and Militia were reorganised nationally, with the former becoming the Territorial Force and the latter the Special Reserve; the regiment now had one Reserve and two Territorial battalions.

=== First World War, 1914–1918 ===
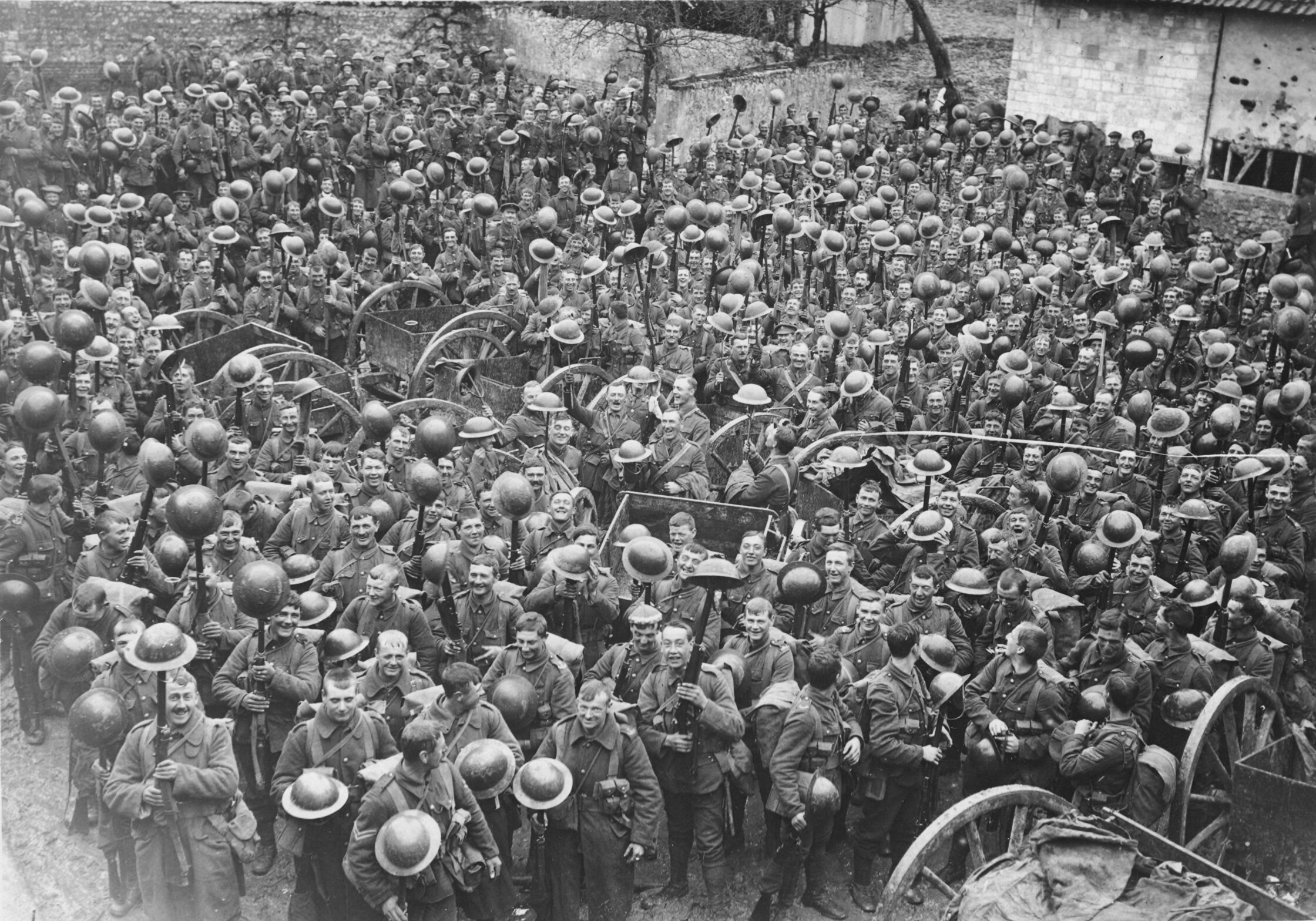
Men of the Loyal North Lancashire Regiment showing off their new steel helmets in 1916

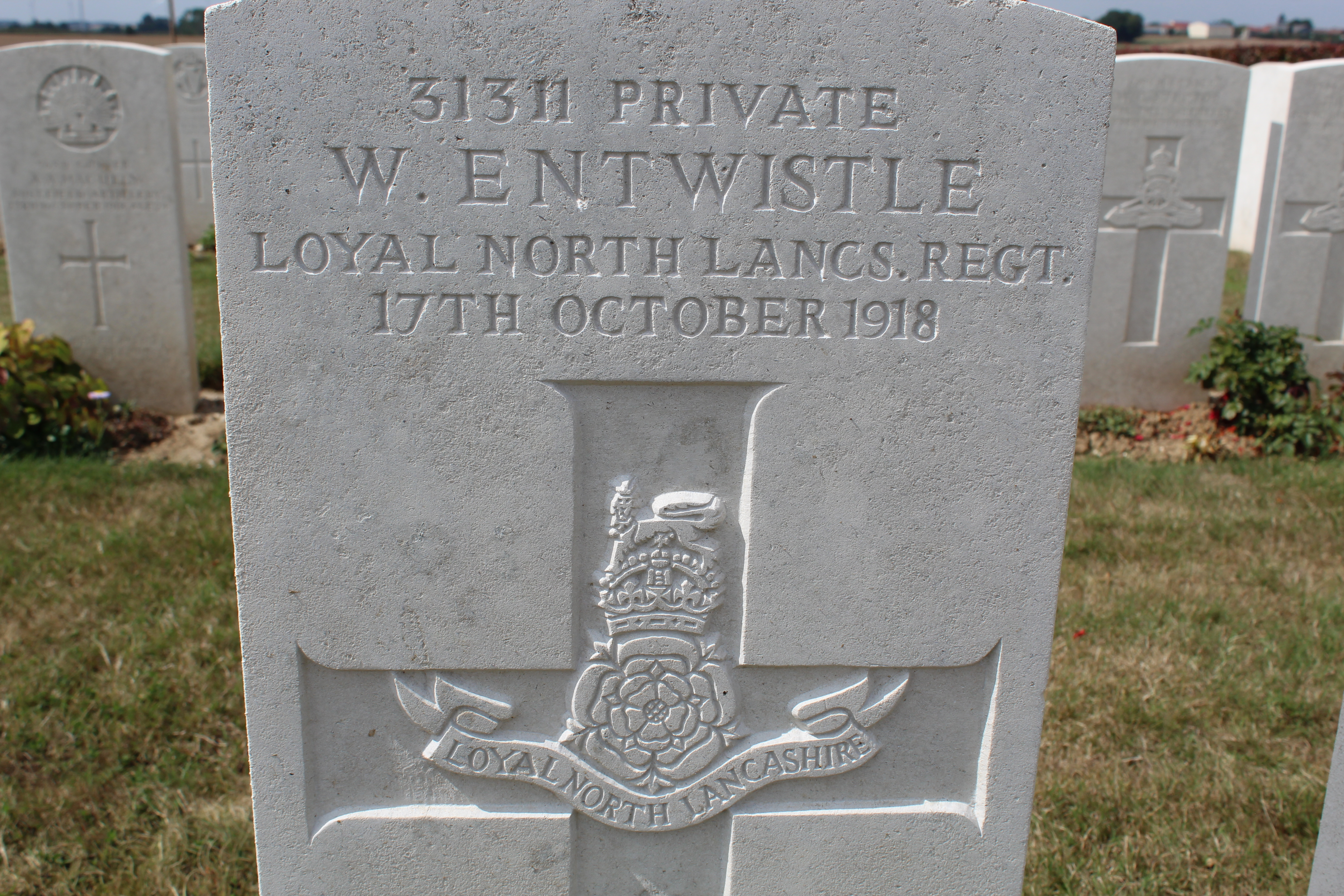
Grave Marker in the Cemetery "Prémont British Cemetery" (France)"

The Regiment raised a number of extra war service battalions during The Great War. In all the Loyal North Lancs expanded to 21 battalions of infantry for service at home and abroad. Of these, there were the two regular battalions (the 1st and 2nd Battalions), the Special Reserve (former militia) battalion (3rd (Reserve) Battalion), ten Territorial Force battalions (1/4th, 1/5th, 2/4th, 2/5th, 3/4th, 3/5th, 4/5th, 1/12th (Pioneers), 2/12th and 14th Battalions), and seven service battalions of Kitchener's Army (6th, 7th, 8th, 9th, 10th, 11th (Reserve) and 15th Battalions), as well as a home service battalion (13th (Home Service) Battalion).

==== Regular Army ====
The 1st Battalion landed at Le Havre as part of the 2nd Brigade in the 1st Division in August 1914 for service on the Western Front. The 2nd Battalion landed at Tanga in German East Africa as part of the 27th Indian Brigade in November 1914 and then moved to Mombasa later in the month for service in East Africa; it was then transferred to Egypt in January 1917 for service in North Africa and to France in May 1918 for service on the Western Front.

==== Special Reserve ====
The 3rd (Reserve) Battalion spent the whole war at Felixstowe in the Harwich Garrison fulfilling its dual role of coast defence and preparing reinforcement drafts of regular reservists, special reservists, recruits and returning wounded for the regular battalions serving overseas. Thousands of men would have passed through its ranks during the war. It probably assisted in the formation of 11th (Reserve) Battalion at Felixstowe on 2 October 1914 from Kitchener's Army volunteers.

==== Territorial Force ====
The 1/4th Battalion landed at Boulogne as part of the 154th Brigade in the 51st (Highland) Division in May 1915 for service on the Western Front. The 1/5th Battalion landed at Le Havre as part of the 16th Brigade in the 6th Division in February 1915 also for service on the Western Front. The 2/4th Battalion landed at Le Havre as part of the 170th Brigade in the 57th (2nd West Lancashire) Division in February 1917 also for service on the Western Front. The 2/5th Battalion landed at Le Havre as part of the 154th Brigade in the 51st (Highland) Division in February 1917 also for service on the Western Front. The 4/5th Battalion landed at Le Havre as part of the 170th Brigade in the 57th (2nd West Lancashire) Division in February 1917 also for service on the Western Front. The 1/12th Battalion (Pioneers) landed at Le Havre as pioneer battalion to the 60th (2/2nd London) Division in June 1916 also for service on the Western Front.

==== New Army battalions ====
The 6th (Service) Battalion sailed as part of the 38th Brigade of the 13th (Western) Division to join the Mediterranean Expeditionary Force and landed at Anzac Cove on 4 August 1915. After participating in the battles at Anzac Cove and Suvla Bay, the battalion, along with the rest of the division, was withdrawn from Gallipoli and sent to Egypt to refit in January 1916. In February 1916, the division was ordered to move to join the Tigris Corps in its operations to relieve the Anglo-Indian garrison besieged at Kut. As part of the Tigris Corps, the battalion attempted to lift the siege of Kut. Initially deployed along the left bank of the Tigris River, the battalion participated in the Battle of Fallahiya on 6 April 1916 and Battle of Sanniyat on 9 April 1916. The battalion managed to break into the Turkish positions at the Sanniyat, but because follow-on forces were unable to link up with them, they along with the rest of the 38th Brigade were eventually driven back. The battalion were next tasked with seizing the beachhead on the far side of the Diyala River. Approximately 100 men of the battalion were able to make the initial crossing on 8 March 1917. Subjected to multiple counter-attacks through the day, the battalion held on to the beachhead despite the main force being unable to land more troops. They were not relieved until the next day when the Turkish forces retreated.

The 7th (Service) Battalion landed at Boulogne as part of the 56th Brigade in the 19th (Western) Division in July 1915 for service on the Western Front. The 8th (Service) Battalion and the 9th (Service) Battalion both landed at Boulogne as part of the 74th Brigade in the 25th Division in September 1915 also for service on the Western Front. The 10th (Service) Battalion landed at Boulogne as part of the 112th Brigade in the 37th Division in August 1915 also for service on the Western Front. The 15th (Service) Battalion landed at Boulogne as pioneer battalion to the 14th (Light) Division in July 1918 also for service on the Western Front.

=== Between the wars ===
Even though The Great War ended with the Armistice, battalions of the Loyal Regiment remained active in the early post-war years. The 2nd Loyals were sent to Ireland for service during the Irish War of Independence. The Loyals were dispatched to serve during the Chanak Crisis. Both battalions of the Loyals served in China during the Warlord Era and the Chinese Civil War, protecting the legation in Peking and the international settlements at Tientsin, Canton, and most importantly Shanghai. The 1st Loyals also saw action in policing the British Mandate of Palestine during the 1936–1939 Arab revolt in Palestine.

=== Second World War, 1939–1945 ===
==== Regular Army battalions ====
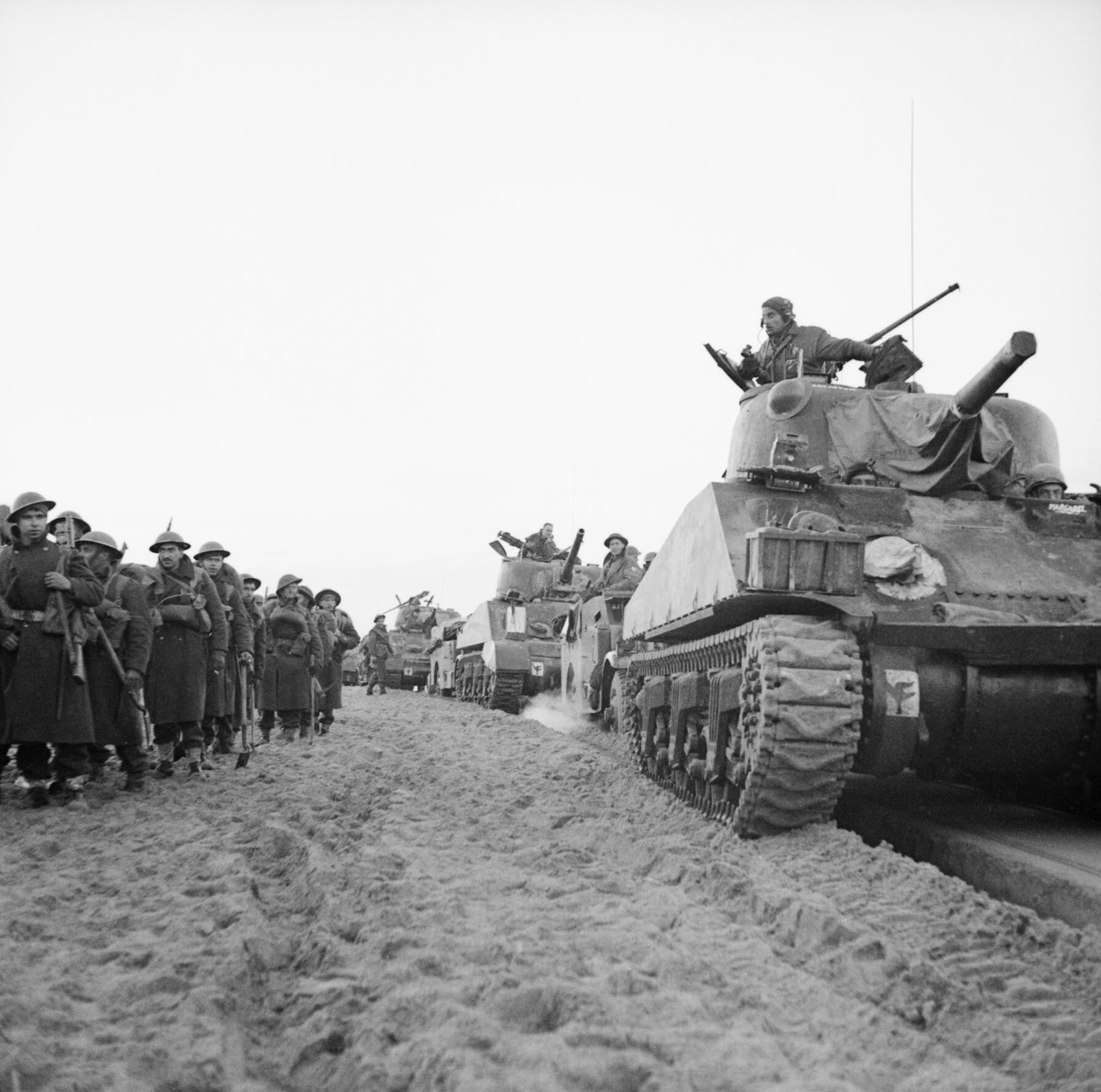
Sherman tanks of the 46th Royal Tank Regiment come ashore with infantry of the 1st Battalion, Loyal Regiment (North Lancashire) at Anzio, Italy, 22 January 1944.

At the outbreak of the Second World War, the 1st Battalion, Loyal Regiment were part of the 2nd Infantry Brigade, which also included, in addition to 1st Loyals, the 2nd Battalion, North Staffordshire Regiment and the 1st Battalion, Gordon Highlanders (6th Gordons from early March 1940). The brigade was attached to the 1st Infantry Division. In September 1939 they were sent to France as part of the British Expeditionary Force (BEF) and remained there alongside the French Army until May 1940. The 1st Loyals would participate in the fighting in France and Belgium in 1940, including acting as part of the rearguard for the Dunkirk evacuation during the Battle of Dunkirk. After spending two years on home defence, the 1st Loyals would eventually would see action again as part of the British First Army, fighting in the North African Campaign, in the Tunisia Campaign in early 1943, and Italian Campaign and at the Battle of Anzio where the 1st Division saw some of the fiercest fighting of the war, and 1st Loyals lost a company during a German counterattack but managed to repel them. In May the battalion fought in the breakout of the Anzio bridgehead, Operation Diadem also fought in the battles around the Gothic Line throughout the summer, now as part of the British Eighth Army. The battalion, along with the rest of the 1st Division, were sent to Palestine in January 1945. During the fighting in the Tunisian campaign, in April 1943, Lieutenant Willward Alexander Sandys-Clarke was posthumously awarded the regiment's only Victoria Cross of the war.

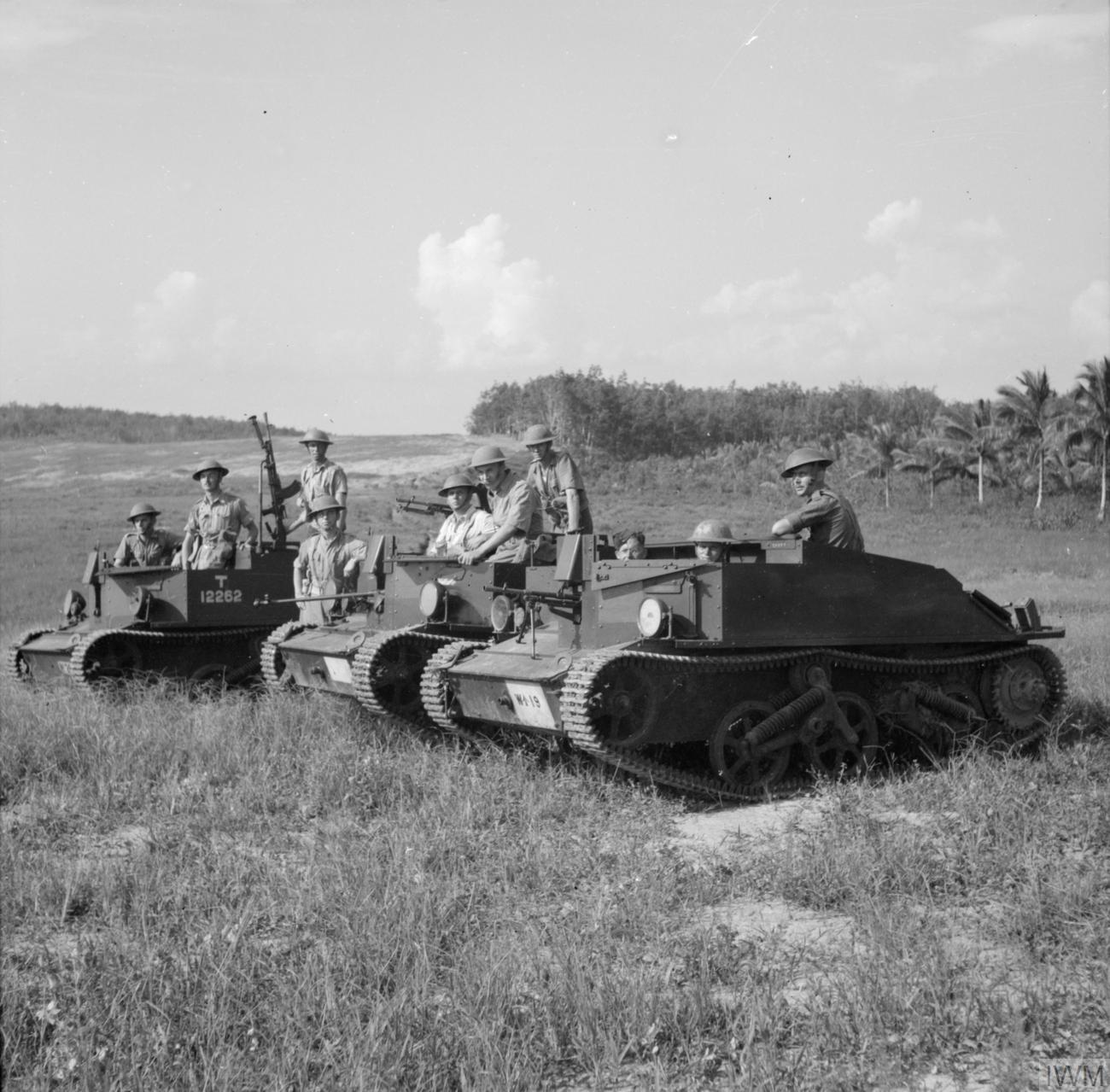
Bren gun carriers of the 2nd Battalion, Loyal Regiment (North Lancashire) in training, Malaya, October 1941.

Upon the commencement of hostilities in 1939, the 2nd Battalion, Loyal Regiment found themselves stationed in the Far East as part of Singapore Fortress's 1st Malaya Infantry Brigade. After the Japanese attack on Pearl Harbor, the 2nd Loyals fought in Malaya as part of the delaying action during the Battle of Malaya. Eventually, the 2nd Battalion surrendered along with the rest of the Singapore garrison on 15 February 1942. The survivors spent the rest of the war as prisoners of the Imperial Japanese Army. Following the destruction of the 2nd Loyals with its surrender at Singapore, the battalion was reformed in Britain. The 10th Battalion, a hostilities-only battalion created in 1940, was re-designated as the new 2nd Battalion on 28 May 1942.

==== Territorial Army battalions ====
In addition to the two Regular Army battalions, the Loyal Regiment also had two Territorial Army battalions (the 5th and 6th) at the start of the war. The 4th Battalion had been converted to the 62nd Searchlight Regiment, Royal Engineers before the war. In 1940, it was transferred to the Royal Artillery. In 1943, it became 150th (Loyals) Anti-Aircraft Regiment, Royal Artillery and, in March 1944, joined the 9th Armoured Division until it was disbanded and the regiment later served with the 55th (West Lancashire) Infantry Division from August 1944 until March 1945 when it was sent to North-west Europe to join the British Second Army.

The 5th Battalion was trained as a motorcycle battalion in the 55th (West Lancashire) Division. The 5th Battalion later was transferred and converted, in 1941, into a Reconnaissance Corps unit for the 18th (East Anglian) Division and re-designated as the 18th Battalion, Reconnaissance Corps. The 18th Recce was transferred with the rest of the 18th Division as reinforcements for the Battle of Singapore. They arrived at Singapore late in the campaign without much of their equipment and were used as regular infantrymen until the surrender on 15 February 1942. Like the men of the Regular 2nd Battalion captured in Singapore, the men of 18th Recce spent the rest of the war as prisoners of the Imperial Japanese Army.

The 6th Battalion was raised in 1939 as a 2nd Line duplicate of the 5th Battalion and served with its parent unit in the 55th (West Lancashire) Division until being transferred to the 59th (Staffordshire) Division soon after the outbreak of war. The battalion, like its parent unit, was also trained as a motorcycle battalion in the 59th Division. Like the 5th Battalion, the 6th Battalion Loyals were also converted in 1941 from their infantry role. The battalion was transferred to the Reconnaissance Corps and converted and re-designated as 2nd Reconnaissance Regiment and joined the 2nd Infantry Division, a Regular Army formation, on 30 April 1941. With the rest of the division, it was transferred in April 1942 to British India, where it would be engaged against the Imperial Japanese Army, notably in India during the Battle of Kohima in 1944 and then as part of William Slim's, commander of the British Fourteenth Army, offensive to re-capture Burma.

==== War Service battalions ====
The 7th Battalion was a wartime infantry unit raised at the regimental headquarters, Fulwood Barracks, Preston, on 4 July 1940. The bulk of the battalion's recruits were men from Merseyside, Cheshire and Lancashire, who had been called up for military service. Along with the 8th and 9th battalions it assembled in camp at Caernarfon where, together with 12th Battalion Royal Welch Fusiliers, they constituted No 15 Infantry Training Group, later 215th Independent Infantry Brigade (Home), a home defence formation. Training was hampered by the shortage of rifles and equipment, the tented camp became uninhabitable during winter gales, and the battalions went into billets. The 7th battalion went on anti-invasion duties in Liverpool. In February 1941, the brigade transferred to the Durham and North Riding County Division in North East England, guarding the Scarborough coast, Darlington and Redcar against Operation Sea Lion, the German invasion of England, which never arrived. On 13 November 1941, the 7th Battalion was transferred to the Royal Artillery and converted into the 92nd (Loyals) Light Anti-Aircraft Regiment, Royal Artillery and joined the British 3rd Infantry Division, a Regular Army formation. The regiment landed in Normandy with the rest of 3rd Division on D-Day, 6 June 1944, and performed notable service during Operation Tonga in defence of Pegasus Bridge and Horsa Bridge and later fought in the entire North West Europe Campaign.

The 8th Battalion was formed on 4 July 1940 at Ashton-under-Lyne, with the majority of the recruits coming from Liverpool and the cadre of experienced non-commissioned officers and men from the Manchester Regiment's Machine Gun Training Centre at Ladysmith Barracks, Ashton-under-Lyne. It also served in 215th Independent Infantry Brigade (Home), and went into billets in disused mills at Biddulph and Huyton during the winter of 1940–41. Like the 7th Loyals, the 8th Battalion was also transferred to the Royal Artillery, becoming the 93rd Light Anti-Aircraft Regiment, Royal Artillery, on 15 November 1941. In January 1942, it joined the 42nd Support Group in 42nd Armoured Division (converted from the 42nd (East Lancashire) Infantry Division). When the 42nd Armoured was broken up in October 1943, the regiment served in Home Forces, joining 80th AA Brigade to train for an assault role on D-Day. Like the 92nd LAA Regiment, the 93rd LAA Regiment served with the British Second Army in the North West Europe Campaign from 1944 to 1945.

The 9th Battalion was also raised in 1940, serving alongside the 7th and 8th battalions in 215th Independent Infantry Brigade (Home). In 1941, the battalion was transferred to the Royal Armoured Corps and converted into the 148th Regiment Royal Armoured Corps. However, they continued to wear their Loyal Regiment cap badge on the black beret of the Royal Armoured Corps, as did all infantry units converted in such a way. The regiment joined 33rd Armoured Brigade (previously 33rd Tank Brigade) and landed on the beaches of Normandy on 13 June 1944. The regiment fought throughout the Battle for Caen until it was disbanded, due to an acute shortage of manpower, on 16 August 1944, and replaced in the brigade by the 1st East Riding Yeomanry.

The 50th (Holding) Battalion was raised in June 1940. The battalion's purpose was to temporarily 'hold' men who were medically unfit or homeless, awaiting orders, on courses or returning from abroad. In October, it was redesignated as the 10th Battalion and joined the 210th Independent Infantry Brigade (Home) and then the 203rd Independent Infantry Brigade (Home). The battalion was again re-designated as the 2nd Battalion on 28 May 1942 after the original 2nd Battalion was lost at Singapore in February. The new 2nd Battalion served mainly in the United Kingdom with the 199th Brigade (later 166th Bde) in 55th (West Lancashire) Infantry Division. However, in October 1944, the battalion was sent to Italy to fight in the Italian Campaign with the 20th Indian Infantry Brigade, 10th Indian Infantry Division, and saw action in Operation Grapeshot, the final offensive in Italy.

=== Loyal Regiment (North Lancashire), 1946–1970 ===
The Loyal Regiment continued to serve during the sunset of the British Empire. Battalions of the regiment served in the Palestine Mandate. The 1st Battalion served in the Malayan Emergency from 1957 to 1959. B Company was dispatched to Aden during the Emergency in 1966. A Company was also dispatched followed by C Company prior to the withdrawal of British troops that year. The Regiment was amalgamated with The Lancashire Regiment (Prince of Wales's Volunteers) to form The Queen's Lancashire Regiment at Connaught Barracks in Dover in March 1970.

== Regimental museum ==
The Lancashire Infantry Museum is based at Fulwood Barracks in Preston.

== Battle honours ==
The following are the battle honours earned by the Loyal Regiment. This includes those awarded to the 47th (Lancashire) Regiment of Foot, 81st (Loyal Lincoln Volunteers) Regiment of Foot, the predecessors of the Loyal Regiment (North Lancashire).

- Seven Years War: Louisburg, Quebec 1759
- Peninsula Campaign: Maida, Corunna, Tarifa, Vittoria, San Sebastian, Nive, Peninsula.
- First Anglo-Burmese War, 1824–1826: Ava
- Crimean War, 1854–1856: Alma; Inkermann, Sevastopol.
- Second Afghan War, 1878–1880: Ali Masjid, Afghanistan 1878-9
- Anglo-Boer War, 1899–1902: Defence of Kimberley, South Africa 1899–1902; Mediterranean 1900–01
- First World War, 1914–1918: Mons; Aisne 1914, 1918; Ypres 1914, 1917, 1918; Somme 1916, 1918; Lys; Hindenburg Line; Suvla; Gaza; Baghdad; Kilimanjaro. Retreat from Mons; Marne 1914, 1918; Langemarck 1914; Gheluvelt; Nonne Bosschen; Givenchy 1914; Aubers; Festubert 1915; Loos; Albert 1916; Bazentin; Pozières; Guillemont; Ginchy; Flers–Courcelette; Morval; Ancre Heights; Ancre 1916; Arras 1917, 1918; Scarpe 1917; Arleux; Messines 1917; Pilckem; Menin Road; Polygon Wood; Poelcapelle; Passchendaele; Cambrai 1917, 1918; St Quentin; Bapaume 1918; Estaires; Bailleul; Kemmel; Béthune; Scherpenberg; Soissonnais-Ourcq; Drocourt-Quéant; Epéhy; Canal du Nord; St Quentin Canal; Courtrai; Selle; Sambre; France and Flanders 1914–18; Doiran 1917; Macedonia 1917; Sari Bair; Gallipoli 1915; Egypt 1916; Nebi Samwil; Jerusalem; Jaffa; Tell'Asur; Palestine 1917–18; Tigris 1916; Kut al Amara 1917; Mesopotamia 1916–18; East Africa 1914–16.
- Second World War, 1939–1945: Dunkirk 1940; Djebel Kess Kiss; Gueriat el Atach Ridge; North Africa 1943; Anzio; Fiesole; Monte Grande; Italy 1944-5; Johore; Singapore Island. North-West Europe 1940; Banana Ridge; Medjez Plain; Djebel Bou Aoukaz 1943 I; Gab Gab Gap; Rome; Gothic Line; Monte Gamberaldi; Monte Ceco; Batu Pahar; Malaya 1941-2

== Regimental traditions ==
=== Anniversaries ===
As with many British Army regiments, the Loyals accumulated a number of traditional observances during their existence. The first to happen each year was the celebration of the regiment's defence of Kimberley during the Boer War. Annually, the regiment would celebrate this battle honour on 15 February. The next anniversary on the calendar commemorated the victory at the Battle of Maida, where the 1st Battalion of the 81st Regiment, won the battle honour carried by the Loyals. Annually, the regiment commemorated the battle with a parade and dinner in the mess. Annually on 13 September, the Loyals commemorated Quebec Day. This celebrated the 47th Regiment's participation in the capture of Quebec under General Wolfe. Men of the 1st Battalion of the Loyals, successors to the 47th (Lancashire) Regiment of Foot, were eligible to become members of the Wolfe Society. The anniversary was marked by a trooping of the colours while the regimental band played the 47th Regiment's slow march followed by Quebec. On New Year's Eve, the Sergeants' Mess of the Loyals would hold a ball in celebration of Tarifa Day. The ball commemorated the defense of Tarifa by the 47th Regiment in 1811 against a determined assault by the French army.

=== Nicknames ===
The Loyal Regiment inherited its nicknames from its predecessor formations. The regiment's uniform, which was initially scarlet with white facings and the Lancashire rose on their cap badges earned them the name "Cauliflowers" because of the similar looks. For their service under Wolfe during the Seven Years' War, as well as his earlier service in the regiment, they were known as "Wolfe's Own". As they recruited and were affiliated within Lancashire, they were also known as the "Lancashire Lads".

=== Possessions ===
Over the years, the Loyals, as well as their predecessors acquired a number of possessions which were prized by the regiment. Important to every regiment of the British Army was its silver. In 1958, in honour of Queen Elizabeth II, the regiment's officers purchased an equestrian statue which was placed in front of the commanding officer's place setting. Before the junior lieutenant's place setting, there was placed a silver fox statue, acquired by the regiment in 1928. Finally, there was the Subaltern's Cup. This was a silver goblet that was part of the place setting of the senior lieutenant of the regiment and used as part of a drinking ritual when the senior lieutenant was finally promoted to captain. Perhaps the oldest of the regiment's treasures was a snuff box made from a tortoise shell. After the Battle of Maida, the commander of the 1/81st Regiment, Lieutenant-Colonel Kempt, had a dinner made from a tortoise found near the battle. He turned the shell of the tortoise into a snuff box and presented it to the officer's mess.

== Victoria Cross recipients ==
- Private John McDermond (47th Regiment of Foot, later 1st Battalion, Loyal North Lancashire Regiment) 5 November 1854, Inkerman, Crimea.
- Private Henry Edward Kenny (1st Battalion, Loyal North Lancashire Regiment) 25 September 1915, Loos, France.
- (Temporary) Lieutenant Thomas Orde Lawder Wilkinson (7th (Service) Battalion, Loyal North Lancashire Regiment) 5 July 1916, posthumously.
- Lieutenant Richard Basil Brandram Jones (8th (Service) Battalion, Loyal North Lancashire Regiment), 21 May 1916, Vimy, France, posthumously.
- Lieutenant Willward Alexander Sandys-Clarke (1st Battalion, Loyal Regiment (North Lancashire)), 23 April 1943, Guiriat El Atach, Tunisia, posthumously.

== Regimental Colonels ==
Colonels of the regiment were:

- 1881–1885 (1st Battalion) Gen. Sir William Sherbrooke Ramsay Norcott, KCB
- 1881–?1900 (2nd Battalion) Gen. Henry Renny, CSI
- 1885–1909 (1st Battalion only, 1885–?1900) Gen. Sir Richard Thomas Farren, GCB
- 1909–1916 Maj-Gen. Hugh Thomas Jones-Vaughan
- 1916–1926 Gen. Sir James Willcocks, GCB, GCMG, KCSI, DSO
- 1926–1931 Lt-Gen. Sir Gerald Francis Ellison, KCB, KCMG
- 1931–1945 Brig-Gen. John Bayford Wells, CMG, CBE, DSO
- 1945–1949 Brig. John Percy Delabene Underwood, DSO
- 1949–1959 Brig. George Giffard Rawson Williams, MBE
- 1959–1970 Brig. Geoffrey Ackworth Rimbault, CBE, DSO, MC
- In 1970, the Regiment was amalgamated with The Lancashire Regiment (Prince of Wales's Volunteers) to form the Queen's Lancashire Regiment

== Sources ==
- Farndale, General Sir Martin (1996). History of the Royal Regiment of Artillery: The Years of Defeat: Europe and North Africa, 1939–1941. London: Brasseys. ISBN 1-85753-080-2.
- Forty, George (1998). British Army Handbook 1939–1945. Stroud: Sutton. ISBN 0-7509-1403-3.
- Col George Jackson Hay, An Epitomized History of the Militia (The Constitutional Force), London:United Service Gazette, 1905/Ray Westlake Military Books, 1987 ISBN 0-9508530-7-0.
- Brig E.A. James, British Regiments 1914–18, London: Samson Books, 1978/Uckfield: Naval & Military Press, 2001, ISBN 978-1-84342-197-9.
- Joslen, Lieutenant-Colonel H.F. (2003). Orders of Battle, United Kingdom and Colonial Formations and Units in the Second World War, 1939–1945. Uckfield: Naval & Military Press. ISBN 1-843424-74-6.
- Routledge, Brigadier N.W. (1994). History of the Royal Regiment of Artillery: Anti-Aircraft Artillery 1914–55. London: Royal Artillery Institution/Brassey's. ISBN 1-85753-099-3.
