= 170th (2/1st North Lancashire) Brigade =

- Active: November 1914–July 1919; November 1943–April 1944
- Country: United Kingdom
- Branch: British Army
- Type: Infantry Brigade
- Role: Infantry and deception
- Part of: 57th (2nd West Lancashire) Division

170th (2/1st North Lancashire) Brigade was a 2nd-Line infantry formation of the British Territorial Force, raised during the First World War. It served on the Western Front. During the Second World War, the brigade's number was also used for deception purposes.

== Origin ==
On 31 August 1914, the War Office authorised the formation of a reserve or 2nd-Line unit for each Territorial Force (TF) unit that was proceeding on overseas service. The 2nd/1st North Lancashire Brigade came into existence in November 1914, composed of 2nd-Line duplicates of the battalions of the peacetime North Lancashire Brigade that were due to be sent overseas. The brigade was part of 2nd West Lancashire Division. In August 1915 these formations were assigned numbers, becoming 170th (2nd/1st North Lancashire) Brigade and 57th (2nd West Lancashire) Division respectively.

== Order of battle ==
The following units served in the brigade during the war:

- 2/4th Battalion King's Own Royal Regiment (Lancaster) – supplied drafts to 1/4th Bn and left brigade in October 1915 to become a reserve battalion
- 2/5th Battalion King's Own Royal Regiment (Lancaster)
- 2/4th Battalion Loyal North Lancashire Regiment
- 2/5th Battalion Loyal North Lancashire Regiment – amalgamated with 1/5th Bn Loyals from 55th (West Lancashire) Division 4 February 1918 and was renumbered 1/5th Bn; left the brigade to become the divisional pioneer battalion 5 February 1918
- 4/5th Battalion Loyal North Lancashire Regiment – formed October 1915; amalgamated with 1/5th Bn Loyals 4 February 1918
- 170th Machine Gun Company – joined February 1917; transferred to 57th Bn Machine Gun Corps 1 March 1918
- 170th Trench Mortar Battery – joined February 1917

== Commanders ==
The following officers commanded the brigade during the war:

- Col. J.H. Campbell (from 4 November 1914)
- Col. S.H. Harrison (transferred from 2/1st Liverpool Brigade April 1915)
- Brig.-Gen. J.J.F. Hume (from 28 January 1916)
- Brig.-Gen. S.P. Rolt (from 28 August 1916)
- Brig.-Gen. A. Martyn (from 15 December 1916)
- Brig.-Gen. F.G. Guggisberg (from 12 May 1917)
- Brig.-Gen. G.F. Boyd (from 16 July 1918)
- Brig.-Gen. A.L. Ransome (from 5 September 1918)

== History ==
The formations and units of 57th Division concentrated around Canterbury in early 1915 as part of Second Army, Central Force. Training was hampered by lack of equipment: the infantry trained on obsolete .256-inch Japanese rifles until .303-inch service rifles (many in poor condition) arrived in November 1915. In July 1916, 57th Division was transferred to the Emergency Reserves in the Aldershot area where it continued training. 170 Brigade moved to Blackdown Camp in October.

On 5 January 1917 the division was ready for overseas service, and between 7 and 22 February its units and formations crossed to France and disembarked at Le Havre. On 25 February it took over a section of the Front Line under the command of II ANZAC Corps. 170 Brigade served on the Western Front for the rest of the war, taking part in the following operations:

- Second Battle of Passchendaele 26 October–7 November 1917
- Second Battle of Arras:
  - Battle of the Scarpe 28–30 August 1918
  - Battle of Drocourt-Queant Line 2–3 September 1918
- Battles of the Hindenburg Line:
  - Battle of the Canal du Nord 27 September–1 October 1918
  - Battle of Cambrai 8–9 October 1918
  - Capture of Cambrai 9 October 1918
- Final Advance in Artois and Flanders 15 October–1 November 1918
  - Occupation of Lille 17 October 1918

On 1 November 1918 170 Bde went into billets at Lille, and was still resting when the Armistice with Germany was signed. For the rest of 1918 its units were involved in clearing and evacuating stores from the Arras area. Demobilisation began in January 1919 and units were steadily reduced to cadres. The last cadres of 57th Division left France in July 1919, completing the disbandment of 170 Bde.

== Second World War ==
170 Brigade was never reformed, but the number was used for deception purposes during the Second World War. 30th Battalion, Royal Northumberland Fusiliers, a line of communication unit serving in 42nd Brigade in North Africa and composed mainly of men below Medical Category 'A', was redesignated '170th Infantry Brigade' and acted as if it were a full brigade from November 1943 until April 1944.

== External sources ==
- The Long, Long Trail
- The Regimental Warpath 1914–1918
