= Charles Cumberland =

Charles Cumberland may refer to:

- Charles Cumberland (English cricketer) (1764–1835), English cricketer
- Charles Cumberland (Australian cricketer) (1801–1882), Australian cricketer
