= Thursby baronets =

Extinct baronetcy in the Baronetage of the United Kingdom

Escutcheon of the Thursby baronets

The Thursby Baronetcy, of Ormerod House in the Parish of Burnley in the County Palatine of Lancaster and of Holmhurst in the Parish of Christchurch in the County of Southampton, was a title in the Baronetage of the United Kingdom. It was created on 26 July 1887 for John Hardy Thursby, then honorary colonel of the 5th Battalion, East Lancashire Regiment.

The Rev. John Hargreaves (1732–1812) had entered the Burnley coal industry through marriage in 1755 and in 1797 he acquired the lease-holds for most of the mineral rights in the area. After his death, the company adopted the name 'The Executors of John Hargreaves'. His nephew Colonel John Hargreaves (1775–1834), who inherited the business, married Charlotte Anne (died 1806), the only child of Lawrence Ormerod of Ormerod Hall in Cliviger. Although they had a son, he had died young, and the property, including the Bank Hall Estate, was divided between two daughters. The younger, also named Charlotte Anne, married General Sir James Yorke Scarlett, a hero of the Battle of Balaclava, but the couple produced no offspring. The elder, Eleanor Mary, married the Rev. William Thursby and their son, John Hardy Thursby, was created a baronet in 1887. The company, later known as Hargreaves Collieries, was by far, the largest mine owner on the Burnley Coalfield, continuing the operate until coal mining in the United Kingdom was nationalised under the Coal Industry Nationalisation Act 1946.

In 1883–84 the Rev. William Thursby gave three acres of land and £1000 toward the construction of Burnley's first hospital. The Victoria Hospital was opened by Prince Albert Victor on 13 October 1886.

== Thursby baronets, of Ormerod House and Holmhurst (1887) ==
- Sir John Hardy Thursby, 1st Baronet (1826–1901) was High Sheriff of Lancashire for 1887. In 1888 he donated about 11 hectares (27 acres) of land, valued at £27,000 (equivalent to about £3 million as of 2018), to the Burnley Corporation for the purpose of creating Queen's Park, the first public park in the town.
- Sir John Ormerod Scarlett Thursby, 2nd Baronet (1861–1920) was president of the British Chess Federation for 15 years, and also one of the founders of the East Lancashire League. He also was High Sheriff for 1905. He stood for election to Parliament for the Conservatives in Clitheroe in the 1885 general election and Burnley at the 1887 by-election, but was beaten by Liberal candidates on both occasions. In 1906 he presented land to the town, lying between Bank Hall and Burnley Central railway station which opened as Thursby Gardens in 1910.
- Sir George James Thursby, 3rd Baronet (1869–1941) was a founding member of the British Field Sports Society, an amateur jockey and Master of the New Forest Buck Hounds. In 1916, he built Fountain Court near Bramshaw an Arts and Crafts manor house.

The title became extinct on the death of the third Baronet in 1941.

Thursby baronets, of Ormerod House and Holmhurst

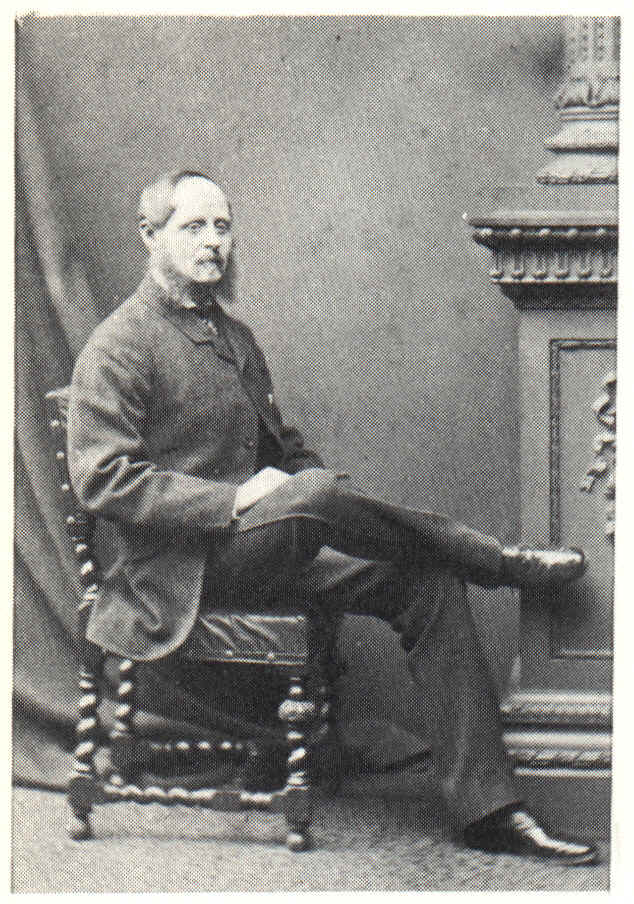
Sir John Hardy Thursby, 1st Baronet (1826–1901)

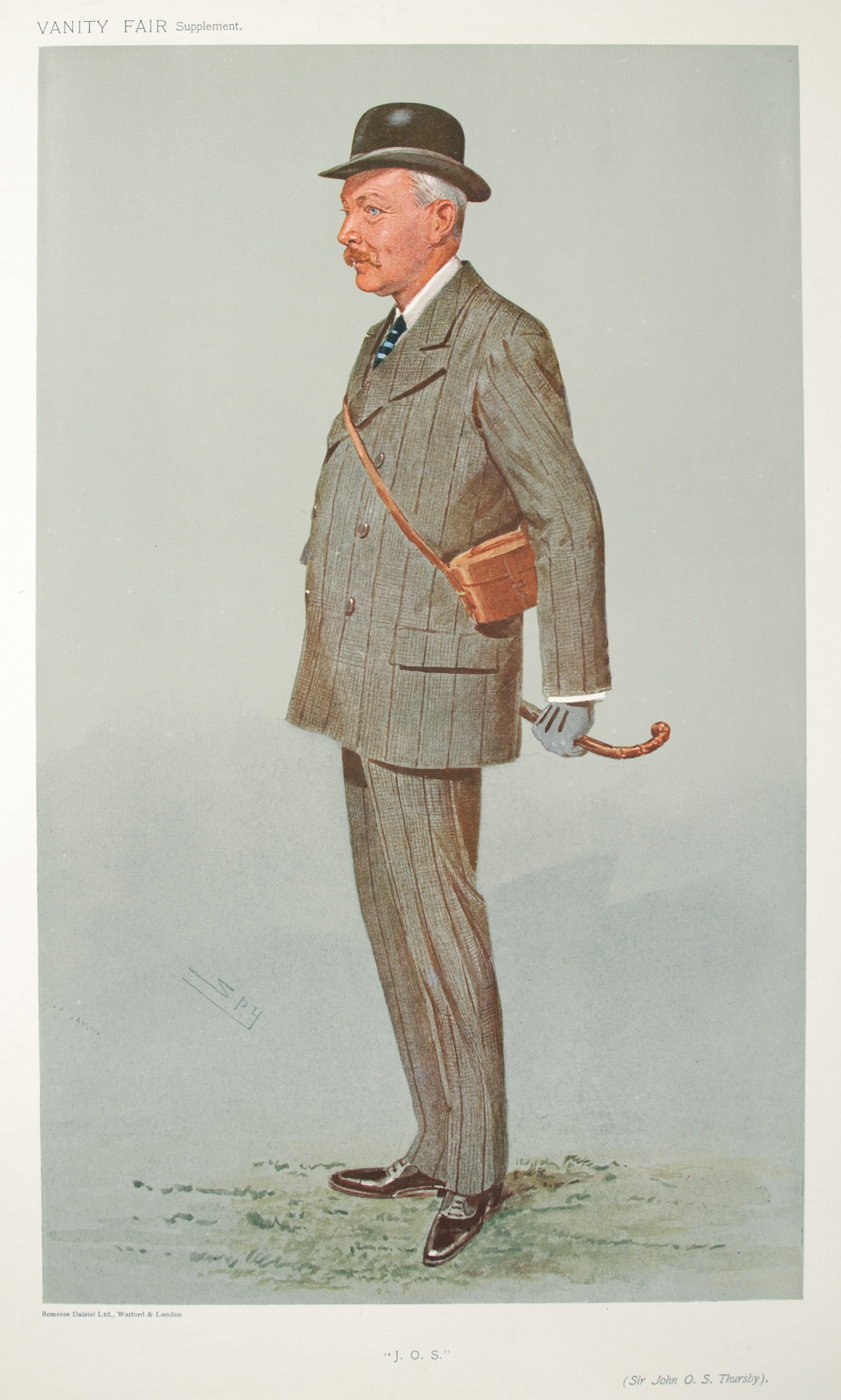
Caricature of Sir John Ormerod Scarlett Thursby, 2nd Baronet (1861–1920), published in Vanity Fair, 28 August 1907

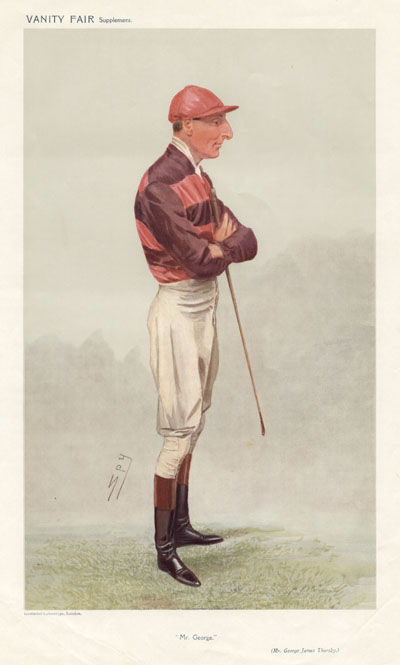
Caricature of Sir George James Thursby, 3rd Baronet (1869–1941)

Baronetage of the United Kingdom
Preceded by Lucas baronets	Thursby baronets of Ormerod House and Holmhurst; 26 July 1887	Succeeded by Loder baronets
