= 5th Royal Lancashire Militia =

Auxiliary unit of the British Army

5th Royal Lancashire Militia 3rd Bn East Lancashire Regiment
- Active: 22 March 1853–April 1953
- Country: United Kingdom
- Branch: Militia/Special Reserve
- Role: Infantry
- Size: 1 Battalion
- Garrison/HQ: Burnley Barracks; Fulwood Barracks, Preston
- Engagements: Second Boer War

The 5th Royal Lancashire Militia (5th RLM) was an auxiliary (Note: It is incorrect to describe the British Militia as 'irregular': throughout their history they were equipped and trained exactly like the line regiments of the regular army, and once embodied in time of war they were fulltime professional soldiers for the duration of their enlistment.) regiment raised in the county of Lancashire in North West England just before the Crimean War. It later became part of the East Lancashire Regiment. Although primarily intended for home defence, it saw two years' active service during the Second Boer War. After conversion to the Special Reserve (SR) under the Haldane Reforms it supplied reinforcements to the fighting battalions during World War I and carried out internal security duties in Ireland. After a shadowy postwar existence the unit was finally disbanded in 1953.

== Background ==
The universal obligation to military service in the Shire levy was long established in England and its legal basis was updated by two acts of 1557 (4 & 5 Ph. & M. cc. 2 and 3), which placed selected men, the 'trained bands', under the command of Lords Lieutenant appointed by the monarch. This is seen as the starting date for the organised county militia in England. It was an important element in the country's defence at the time of the Spanish Armada in the 1580s, and control of the militia was one of the areas of dispute between King Charles I and Parliament that led to the English Civil War. The English Militia was re-established under local control in 1662 after the Restoration of the monarchy, and the Lancashire Militia fought in King William III's campaign in Ireland in 1690–91, and against the Jacobite Risings in 1715 and 1745. However, between periods of national emergency the militia was regularly allowed to decline.

Under threat of French invasion during the Seven Years' War a series of Militia Acts from 1757 reorganised the county militia regiments, the men being conscripted by means of parish ballots (paid substitutes were permitted) to serve for three years. In 1760 Lancashire's quota was set at 800 men in one regiment, which received the title Royal Lancashire Militia in 1761. These reformed regiments were 'embodied' for permanent service in home defence until the end of the Seven Years' War and again during the War of American Independence. In peacetime they assembled for 28 days' annual training. The militia were re-embodied shortly before Revolutionary France declared war on Britain on 1 February 1793.

== French wars ==
Lancashire's militia quota set in 1760 was small in proportion to its population, which soared during the Industrial Revolution. By 1796 it represented only one man in every 43 of those eligible. But in that year an additional ballot was carried out to raise men for the 'Supplementary Militia' to reinforce the standing militia regiments and to form additional temporary regiments. Lancashire's quota was increased to five regiments, and recruitment became difficult. The 4th Royal Lancashire Supplementary Militia was raised on 18 May 1798 under the command of Colonel Peter Patten. The regiment may have assembled eight companies but it never reached full establishment and attempts to convert it into a permanent 5th Royal Lancashire Militia failed when the men refused to serve in Ireland. The supplementary militia was abolished in 1799, the remaining balloted men in Lancashire being distributed to the 1st, 2nd and 3rd Royal Lancashire Militia to fill vacancies.

During the French wars, the militia were embodied for a whole generation, and became regiments of full-time professional soldiers (though restricted to service in the British Isles), which the regular army increasingly saw as a prime source of recruits. They served in coast defences, manning garrisons, guarding prisoners of war, and for internal security, such as the time of the Luddite disturbances. The three regiments of Lancashire militia were serving in Ireland during the final Waterloo campaign and were finally disembodied in 1816. Once again, the militia was allowed to decline in the years of the long peace that followed.

== 5th Royal Lancashire Militia ==
The long-standing Militia of the United Kingdom was revived by the Militia Act 1852, enacted during a period of international tension. As before, units were raised and administered on a county basis, and filled by voluntary enlistment (although conscription by means of the militia ballot might be used if the counties failed to meet their quotas). Training was for 56 days on enlistment, then for 21–28 days per year, during which the men received full army pay. Under the Act, militia units could be embodied by Royal Proclamation for full-time service in three circumstances:

1. 'Whenever a state of war exists between Her Majesty and any foreign power'.
2. 'In all cases of invasion or upon imminent danger thereof'.
3. 'In all cases of rebellion or insurrection'.

With the threat of war against Russia, the three Lancashire regiments were ordered to recruit up to their full establishment of 1200 men. Additional infantry and artillery militia regiments were also formed in Lancashire at this time including the 5th Royal Lancashire Militia (5th RLM) raised at Burnley on 22 March 1853 under the command of Lieutenant-Colonel Commandant Charles Towneley of Towneley Hall (commissioned on 16 March 1853), with his brother John as one of the majors. Soon there were seven militia infantry regiments in Lancashire, each with a defined recruiting area after 1855: the 5th at Burnley also recruited from Accrington, Blackburn, Colne, Middleton, Oldham and Rossendale.

=== Crimean War ===
The 5th RLM had already been embodied on 6 March 1854 before war broke out with Russia in 1854. An expeditionary force having been sent to the Crimea, the militia were required for home defence and service in overseas garrisons. From May 1855 the 5th RLM did duty at Aldershot and then crossed to Ireland, where it served at Dublin and then Clonmel. It was disembodied on 1 May 1856.

Thereafter the militia regularly carried out their peacetime annual training. The Militia Reserve introduced in 1867 consisted of present and former militiamen who undertook to serve overseas in case of war.

Charles Towneley retired from command of the 5th RLM on 23 March 1863, when he was appointed Honorary Colonel and his brother John succeeded him as Lt-Col.

=== Cardwell reforms ===
Under the 'Localisation of the Forces' scheme introduced by the Cardwell Reforms of 1872, Militia regiments were brigaded with regular and Volunteer battalions in a regimental district sharing a permanent depot at a suitable county town. Seven double-battalion or paired single-battalion regular regiments were assigned to Lancashire, and each was linked with one of the militia regiments. The militia now came under the War Office rather than their county lords lieutenant, and officers' commissions were signed by the Queen.

The 5th RLM was linked with the 30th (Cambridgeshire) and 59th (2nd Nottinghamshire) Regiments of Foot in Sub-District No 15 (Lancashire), with the depot at Burnley Barracks. It was intended for the 5th RLM to raise its own 2nd Battalion, but this never happened. Although often referred to as brigades, the regimental districts were purely administrative organisations, but in a continuation of the Cardwell Reforms a mobilisation scheme began to appear in the Army List from December 1875. This assigned regular and militia units to places in an order of battle of corps, divisions and brigades for the 'Active Army', even though these formations were entirely theoretical, with no staff or services assigned. The 5th, 6th and 7th Royal Lancashire Militia formed 2nd Brigade of 3rd Division, VIII Corps at Melrose, Scottish Borders.

== 3rd Battalion, East Lancashire Regiment ==
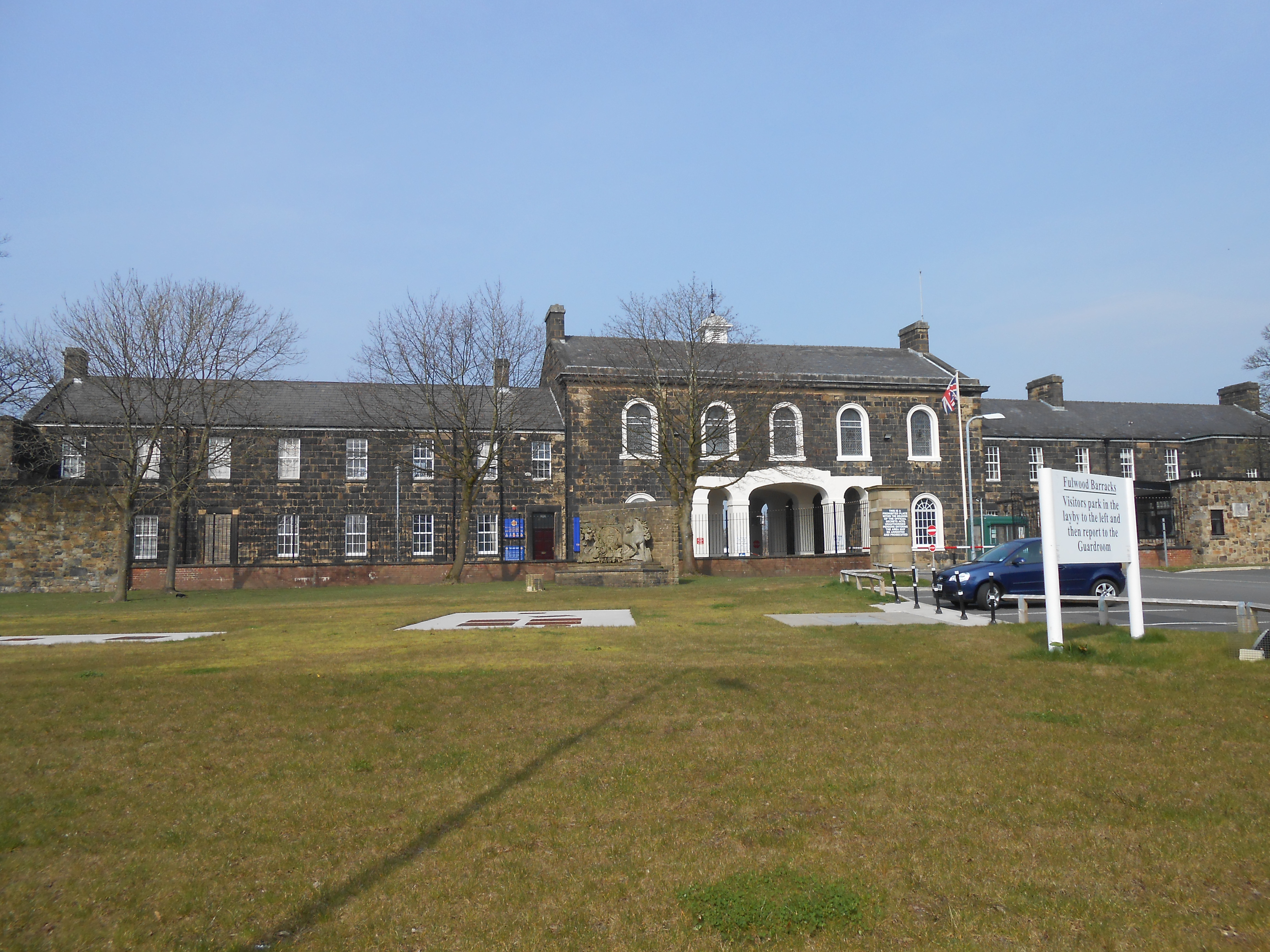
Fulwood Barracks today.

The Childers Reforms completed the Cardwell process by incorporating the militia battalions into the expanded county regiments. On 1 July 1881 the 30th and 59th Foot became the 1st and 2nd Battalions of the East Lancashire Regiment at Burnley with the 5th Royal Lancashire Militia as its 3rd Battalion. In 1898 the East Lancashires gave up Burnley Barracks and moved to Fulwood Barracks at Preston, which ist shared with the Loyal North Lancashire Regiment.

Militia battalions now had a large cadre of permanent staff (about 30). Around a third of the recruits and many young officers went on to join the Regular Army.

=== Second Boer War ===
After the disasters of Black Week at the start of the Second Boer War in December 1899, most of the regular army was sent to South Africa, followed by many militia reservists as reinforcements. Militia units were embodied to replace them for home defence and a number volunteered for active service or to garrison overseas stations. The 3rd East Lancashires were embodied on 24 January 1900 and briefly did duty at The Curragh outside Dublin.

Having volunteered for overseas service, the battalion embarked for South Africa on 16 February 1900 with a strength of 26 officers and 674 other ranks (ORs) under the command of Maj Richard Milne-Redhead (later promoted with effect from that date). After arriving at Cape Town on 13 March the battalion was stationed for six weeks at De Aar and then sent to Norvalspont. Lieutenant-Col Milne-Redhead then returned to England for a while and Lt-Col John Parker took over command. On 27 April the battalion was ordered to march without its heavy baggage to Edenburg, but en route its destination was changed to Glen, north of Bloemfontein and the battalion found itself ahead of the main body of the army. Two companies escorted artillery to Karree, the most forward point held. On 16 May the battalion was ordered to Brandfort, leaving two companies at Glen and two at Karree. Sickness had set in at De Aar and now many of the men were down with Enteric fever, while some casualties were suffered from Boer sniping during June. In August the battalion was reinforced by a 100-man draft of recruits considered too young to join their line battalions; these stayed with 3rd East Lancs until January 1902.

On 22 August Lt-Col Milne-Redhead resumed command and shortly afterwards the battalion was ordered to provide a company garrison at Eensgevonden and to send 200 men to reinforce that at Vet River. On 11 September a force of 1500 Boers was detected trying to cross the railway line, and the 3rd East Lancs provided strong posts between Brandfort and Allemans Siding, where a force (including a detachment of 3rd East Lancs) was waiting for them. However, the Boers turned away, crossing the railway elsewhere, though losing their baggage in the process. By 30 September the battalion was distributed along 48 miles (77 km) of railway between Smaldeel and Glen.

In January 1901 the companies were redistributed and the battalion formed Mounted infantry (MI) sections for scouting and clearing the farms. A gun detachment was trained to man a captured Krupp gun at Smaldeel. The post at Houtenbeck was attacked on 20 February but the Boers were driven off. On 21 April a post on the Winburg railway held by Lance-Sergeant T. Wilson with eight men was attacked for five hours before the Boers withdrew. In June the battalion, with headquarters at Virginia, occupied a chain of blockhouses that had been built between Smaldeel and Riets Spruit, and the men were continuously in action against small parties of Boers trying either to cross or to damage the railway. On 16 August Lt-Col Milne-Redhead returned to England and Lt-Col Parker took over command.

The battalion moved to Smaldeel on 28 January 1902, where it entrained for Cape Town on 20 February. It embarked for England on 1 March and on arrival was disembodied on 25 March 1902. During its two-year tour of duty the battalion lost 50 ORs killed or died of disease. It was granted the Battle Honour South Africa 1900–02 and the participants received the Queen's South Africa Medal with clasps for 'Cape Colony' and 'Orange Free State', and the King's South Africa Medal with clasps for 'South Africa 1901' and 'South Africa 1902'. Lieutenant-Col Milne-Redhead received a CMG.

== Special Reserve ==
After the Boer War, the future of the Militia was called into question. There were moves to reform the Auxiliary Forces (Militia, Yeomanry and Volunteers) to take their place in the six army corps proposed by St John Brodrick as Secretary of State for War. However, little of Brodrick's scheme was carried out.

Under the sweeping Haldane Reforms of 1908, the Militia was replaced by the Special Reserve, a semi-professional force similar to the previous Militia Reserve, whose role was to provide reinforcement drafts for regular units serving overseas in wartime. The battalion became the 3rd (Reserve) Battalion, East Lancashire Regiment, on 27 July 1908.

== World War I ==
=== 3rd (Reserve) Battalion ===
The Special Reserve was mobilised on the outbreak of World War I on 4 August 1914. 3rd Battalion, East Lancashire, embodied at Preston under the command of Lt-Col C.J. Lloyd-Carson (CO since 9 June 1914) and on 8 August proceeded to its war station at Plymouth. It carried out the dual tasks of garrison duties and preparing reinforcement drafts of regular reservists, special reservists, recruits and returning wounded for the two regular battalions serving on the Western Front. In October and November 1914 the 3rd Bn formed 10th (Reserve) Battalion, East Lancashires, at Plymouth from Kitchener's Army volunteers. On 1 June 1917 the 3rd Bn moved for the summer to Saltburn-by-the-Sea and Marske-by-the-Sea in the Tees Garrison; it remained at Saltburn until the end of the war.

However, after the Armistice with Germany the battalion went to Ireland and in 1919 it was stationed in Buttevant carrying out duties in support of the civil power during the Partition crisis. The battalion was disembodied on 7 August 1919, when the remaining personnel were drafted to the 2nd Bn.

=== 10th (Reserve) Battalion ===
After Lord Kitchener issued his call for volunteers in August 1914, the battalions of the 1st, 2nd and 3rd New Armies ('K1', 'K2' and 'K3' of 'Kitchener's Army') were quickly formed at the regimental depots. The SR battalions also swelled with new recruits and were soon well above their establishment strength. On 8 October 1914 each SR battalion was ordered to use the surplus to form a service battalion of the 4th New Army ('K4'). Accordingly, the 3rd (Reserve) Bn formed the 10th (Service) Bn at Plymouth by 13 November. In December it moved to Teignmouth and began training for active service with 99th Brigade in 33rd Division. On 10 April 1915 the War Office decided to convert the K4 battalions into 2nd Reserve units, providing drafts for the K1–K3 battalions in the same way that the SR was doing for the Regular battalions. The East Lancs' battalion became 10th (Reserve) Battalion in 10th Reserve Brigade and the following month it moved to Swanage in Dorset, where it trained drafts for the 6th, 7th, 8th and 9th (Service) Bns of the East Lancs. It moved again with 10th Reserve Bde to Wareham, Dorset, in August 1915. On 1 September 1916 the 2nd Reserve battalions were transferred to the Training Reserve (TR) and the battalion was redesignated 47th Training Reserve Bn, still in 10th Reserve Bde at Seaford. The training staff retained their East Lancs badges. Later the battalion moved to Perham Down Camp on Salisbury Plain, where it was disbanded on 21 January 1918.

=== Postwar ===
The SR resumed its old title of Militia in 1921 and then became the Supplementary Reserve in 1924, but almost all militia battalions remained in abeyance after World War I. Until 1939 they continued to appear in the Army List, but they were not activated during World War II and were all formally disbanded in April 1953.

== Commanders ==
The following served as commanding officer of the regiment:

- Lt-Col Comdt Charles Towneley, appointed 16 March 1853, retired 23 March 1863
- Lt-Col John Towneley, promoted 23 March 1863
- Lt-Col J.H. Thursby, former lieutenant in the 90th Foot, appointed 23 November 1870
- Lt-Col Le Gendre Starkie, formerly 2nd RLM, promoted 3 September 1879
- Lt-Col John Erdeswick Butler-Bowdon, promoted 19 December 1891, resigned 28 March 1900
- Lt-Col Richard Milne-Redhead, promoted wef 16 February 1900, retired October 1901
- Lt-Col John Parker, retired regular major, appointed 11 October 1901
- Lt-Col C.J. Lloyd-Carson, promoted 9 June 1914

The following served as Honorary Colonel:

- Charles Towneley, former CO, appointed 23 March 1863
- John Towneley, former CO, appointed 6 December 1876
- Sir John Thursby, 1st Baronet, former CO, appointed 30 July 1879
- Col John Erdeswick Butler-Bowdon, former CO, appointed 28 June 1908

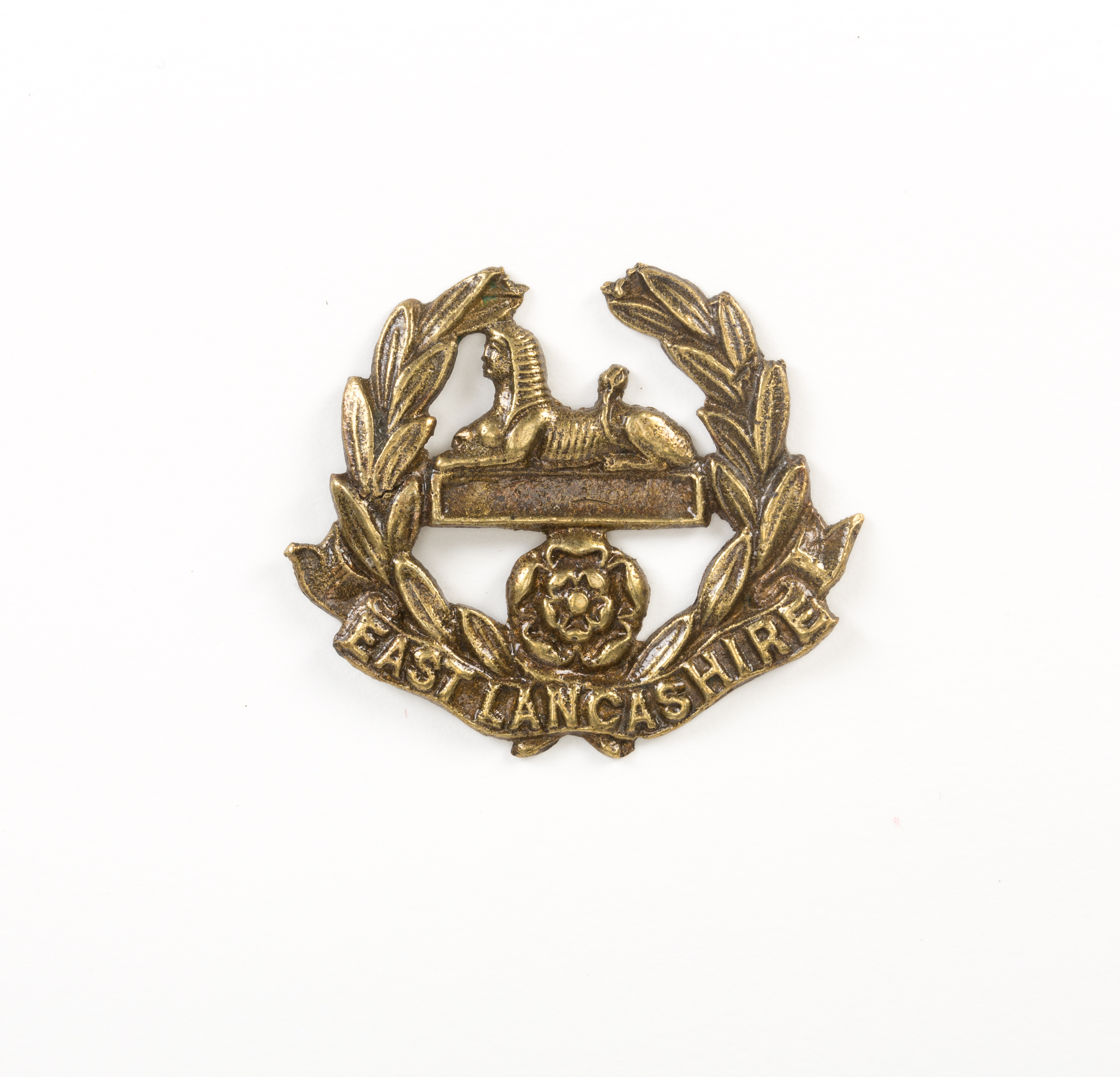
The East Lancashires' cap badge

== Uniforms and insignia ==
The uniform of the Royal Lancashire Militia was scarlet with the blue facings appropriate to 'Royal' regiments. The ORs' jackets of the short-lived 4th Supplementary Militia of 1798–99 was the same as that of 'Old Lancaster ' (ie the 1st Royal Lancashire Militia), but no badge or button designs are recorded for this short-lived regiment. The badge of the 5th RLM formed in 1853 was the Red Rose of Lancaster; on the buttons it was displayed beneath a crown and within a spray of palm leaves. When the 5th RLM joined the East Lancashires in 1881, it adopted that regiment's white facings and insignia.

== See also ==
- Militia (English)
- Militia (Great Britain)
- Militia (United Kingdom)
- Special Reserve
- Lancashire Militia
- East Lancashire Regiment
