= Charles Cumberland (Australian cricketer) =

Australian cricketer

Personal information
- Full name: Charles Burrell Cumberland
- Born: 21 February 1828; Bermuda
- Died: 17 December 1875 (aged 47); Bareilly, British India

Domestic team information
- Years: Team
- 1855–1857: Victoria
- Source: Cricinfo, 13 February 2015

Charles Burrell Cumberland (21 February 1828 – 17 December 1875) was an Australian cricketer, born in Bermuda. He played two first-class cricket matches for Victoria in the 1850s.

Cumberland's father, Charles Brownlow Cumberland (1801–1882) was a major general in the British Army. In 1842, he and his family moved to Hobart, where he commanded the 59th Regiment for several years.

Charles Burrell Cumberland was born in Bermuda while his father was stationed there. He was educated in Tasmania, lived in England between 1849 and 1853, then returned to Australia. Between 1854 and 1862, he lived in Melbourne, where he worked as a judge's associate for Redmond Barry. He played cricket as a batsman and brilliant fieldsman for Melbourne Cricket Club.

In the 1860s Cumberland moved to India, where he worked as a tea planter and government surveyor. He married Marianne Cowans in Calcutta in 1865, and they had a son. Marianne died in India in 1869, and Charles in 1875.
