= Edward Nevil Macready =

British Army officer (1798–1848)

- Born: Birmingham
- Died: 11 April 1848 (aged 49); Clevedon
- Burial place: St. Peter's Churchyard, Leckhampton, Gloucestershire
- Military career
- Allegiance: United Kingdom
- Branch: British Army
- Service years: 1814–1848
- Rank: Major
- Unit: 30th Regiment of Foot
- Conflicts: Napoleonic Wars; Siege of Bergen op Zoom; Battle of Quatre Bras; Battle of Waterloo

Major Edward Nevil Macready (29 May 1798 – 4 November 1848) was a British Army officer who served in India and during the Waterloo Campaign.

== Family background ==
Macready was born in Birmingham, the son of William Macready the elder, an actor-manager and Christina Ann Birch, an actress. He was brother to the noted actor William Macready, who was the subject of a poem by Tennyson. He also had two sisters, Lititia (b. 1794) and Ellen (b. April 1797).

== Career ==
Educated at Rugby School, he joined the 2nd Battalion of the 30th Regiment of Foot, as a volunteer, in 1814, at the age of 16.

Macready later served under Lord Lynedoch in Holland. At the Battle of Waterloo, when still only an ensign, he commanded the light company towards the close of the battle. At the end of the battle he was the only surviving officer, along with 16 men, of the original three officers and 51 men. For his gallantry he was promoted to lieutenant on 20 July 1815 and remained with the Army of Occupation at the end of the Waterloo Campaign.

In one of his private journals Macready tells of his experiences at Waterloo. He is quoted from in Henry Havelick's Three Main Military Questions of the Day published in 1867, in order to show repeated cavalry failures in their attempts to break through infantry squares well provided with ammunition in addition to bayonets. "Here come these fools again," Macready remarks at the repeated charges of the French cuirassiers in the face of significant firepower from the infantry square.

He was at the siege of Asseerghur in Central India during the Third Anglo-Maratha War (1817–1818), and afterwards became military secretary to Sir John Wilson, the governor of Ceylon. He was subsequently aide-de-camp to Lord High Commissioner of the Ionian Islands, James Mackenzie.

Macready was promoted from captain to major by purchase on half pay and unattached on 22 November 1839.

He died at Clevedon on 4 November 1848 and is buried in St. Peter's Churchyard, Leckhampton, Gloucestershire.

== Works ==
Macready wrote a posthumously published biography of the Russian general Alexander Suvorov.

- A sketch of Suwarow and his last campaign : with observations on Mr. Alison's opinion of the Archduke Charles as a military critic, and a few objections to certain military statements in Mr. Alison's History of Europe. London: Smith, Elder. 1851.

He was a prolific keeper of journals, a number of which are in the collection of the National Army Museum. Extracts from his journals from his time in India were also published in Henry Colburn's United Service Magazine and Naval and Military Gazette during the 1850s.

== Family life ==
In 1840 he married Martha Sarah Rolls, who in 1839 had published a series of etchings of Macready's thespian brother. She died on 7 August 1886 and in her will bequeathed £100 to the senior officer other than the colonel-in-chief of the 30th Regiment of Foot for the benefit of the wives, widows and children.
