= Lucas baronets of Ashtead Park and Lowestoft (1887) =

Baronetcy in England

Escutcheon of the Lucas baronets of Ashtead Park and Lowestoft

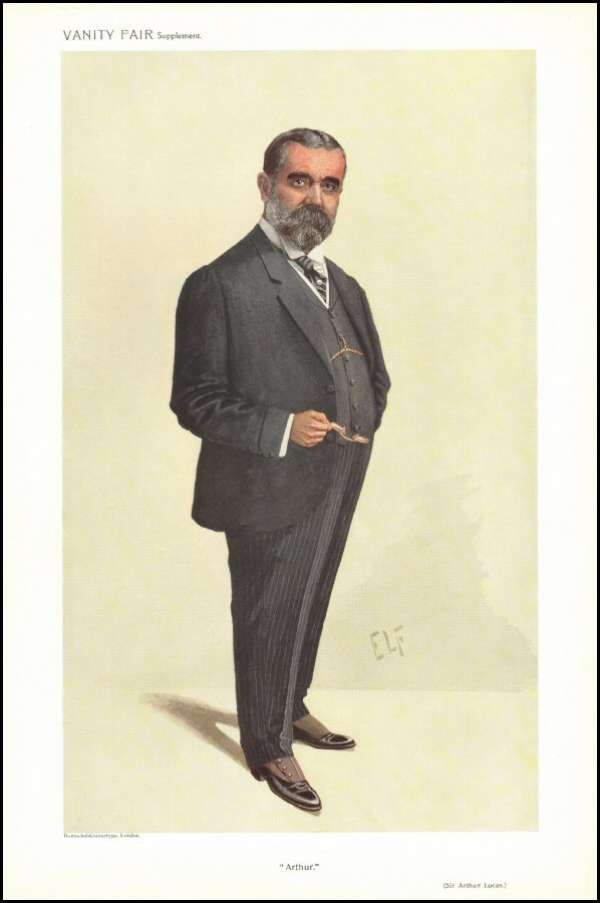
"Arthur": Caricature by Elf of the 2nd Baronet, published in Vanity Fair in 1909

The Lucas baronetcy, of Ashtead Park in the County of Surrey and of Lowestoft in the County of Suffolk, was created in the Baronetage of the United Kingdom on 25 July 1887 for Thomas Lucas, for his services in the building trade with the company Lucas Brothers.

The Official Roll of the Baronetage marks the title "dormant".

== Lucas baronets, of Ashtead Park and of Lowestoft (1887) ==
- Sir Thomas Charles Delight Hughes Lucas, 1st Baronet (1822–1902)
- Sir Arthur Lucas, 2nd Baronet (1853–1915)
- Sir Edward Lingard Delight Lucas, 3rd Baronet (1860–1936)
- Major Sir Jocelyn Lucas KBE MC, 4th Baronet (1889–1980)
- Sir Thomas Edward Gubbins Lucas, 5th Baronet (1930–2026)
- Sir Stephen Ralph James Lucas, presumed 6th Baronet (born 1965)

The heir apparent is his son Samuel Edward James Lucas (born 1999).

== Notes ==
Baronetage of the United Kingdom
Preceded by Philipps baronets	Lucas baronets of Ashtead Park and Lowestoft; 25 July 1887	Succeeded by Thursby baronets
