= Sir John Thursby, 1st Baronet =

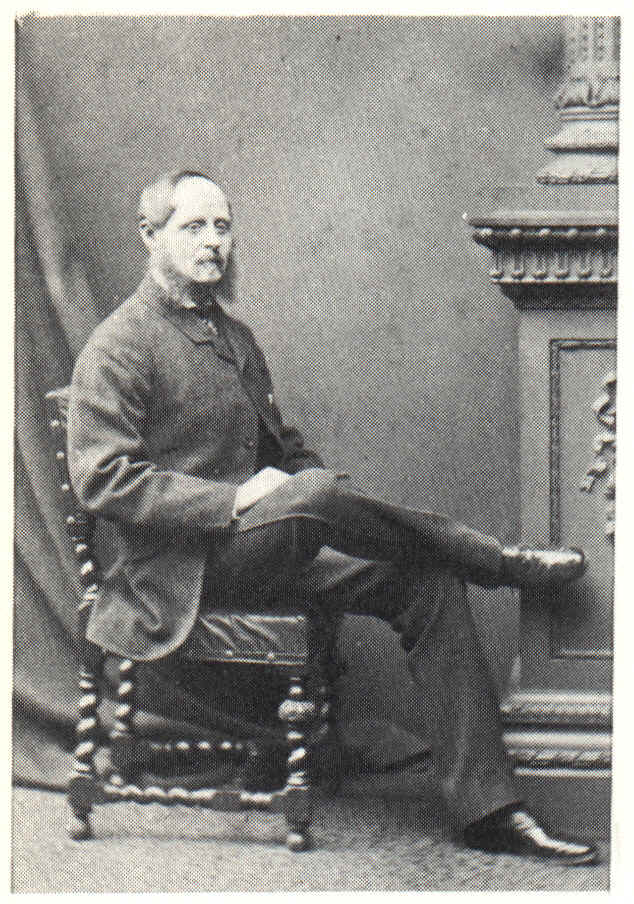
John Thursby

Colonel Sir John Hardy Thursby, 1st Baronet (31 August 1826 – 16 March 1901) was a British landowner, military officer, and sportsman.

== Life ==
Born on 31 August 1826, he was the eldest son of the Rev. William Thursby and Eleanor Mary Hargreaves. His father was vicar of All Saints' Church, Northampton at that time. He had one older sister and five younger brothers, and was educated at Eton College. As a teenager, at Easter 1843, he assisted Studley Martin in excavating an ancient burial site on the moors east of Burnley, Lancashire. The interment urn that they discovered, remained with the family. Thursby's sister Eleanor Anne died, aged 19, in early April 1845.

Opting for a military career, he served in the 90th Light Infantry for eight years, joining as Ensign in September 1845, and obtaining the rank of Lieutenant in November 1848. In the build-up to the Crimean War, in June 1853, he briefly joined the 1st Royal Lancashire Militia (The Duke of Lancaster's Own) as Captain, before moving to the (newly-raised) 7th Royal Lancashire Militia (Rifles) as Major in April 1855. Staying with the Bury-based regiment until March 1870, the following November he took over command of the Burnley-based 5th Royal Lancashire Militia with the rank of Lieutenant-Colonel. The next September, he was given the honorary rank of Colonel, and he retained the command until retirement at the end of July 1879. He then became the regiment's Honorary Colonel.

Through his mother and maternal aunt Charlotte (the wife of General Sir James Yorke Scarlett), Thursby inherited control of The Executors of John Hargreaves, a coal-mining business. The company, later known as Hargreaves Collieries was, by far, the largest mine owner on the Burnley Coalfield.

Keeping his Lancashire seat at Ormerod House, Cliviger near Burnley, he kept another residence at Holmhurst in Christchurch (then in Hampshire, now Dorset) and a townhouse at Ennismore Gardens in Knightsbridge, London. Thursby was a major benefactor in the Burnley area. He provided the site for the Victoria Hospital, paid for works on St John the Evangelist's Church, Worsthorne, and provided a large plot of land for a public park for the town, Queen's Park, Burnley.

Thursby was a justice of the peace for Lancashire and chairman of the Burnley petty sessions. He was High Sheriff of Lancashire in the Golden Jubilee year of 1887, and in the same year was created a Baronet, of Ormerod House in the Parish of Burnley in the County Palatine of Lancaster and of Holmhurst in the Parish of Christchurch in the County of Southampton, on 26 July 1887. He was made deputy lieutenant for Lancashire in 1888.

Thursby was most famous as a sportsman. He was a member of the Four-in-Hand and Coaching Clubs. He possessed a fine shooting estate in Scotland at Panmure House in Angus, of which he was tenant. He was also a hunter and a master of the foxhounds in the western part of the New Forest. Entering into racehorse ownership in 1890, he owned Paddy, which won the 1892 November Handicap at Manchester and the Great Metropolitan at Epsom in 1894. Another horse, The Tartar was highly dominant in its class, winning a total of 27 races. Following the death of the Duke of Westminster, Thursby bought his, previously successful, Calverley at auction for £8,295 (the equivalent of approximately £0.9 million as of 2025 (Note: UK Consumer Price Index inflation figures from 1209–2024 based on data from "Inflation calculator". Bank of England. London. February 18, 2026.)). His exclamation of "too much, too much!" after the hammer fell, was foreshadowing, as the horse never won again and was sent to stud.

Thursby was little involved in politics, but was a Conservative and a member of the Carlton Club. He died in Cannes, France on 16 March 1901, and was succeeded in the baronetcy by his eldest son, Sir John Ormerod Scarlett Thursby. He is buried at the Church of St John the Divine, Holme Chapel, Cliviger. At the probate of the will, Thursby's effects where valued at £606,210 4s 2p (the equivalent of approximately £64.4 million as of 2025). His wife and children dedicated two stained-glass windows on the north side of the nave at St Mark's Church, Highcliffe, Christchurch to his memory. Clayton and Bell manufactured the glass, with depictions the Risen Christ and Mary Magdalene. Sir John Thursby Community College in Burnley is named after him.

== Family ==
Thursby married Clara Williams (the niece of Sir Edward Vaughan Williams) on 21 April 1860, and with her had two children. A son, John Ormerod Scarlett, and a daughter, Violet. Clara died on 21 March 1867 and Thursby married again, to Louisa Harriett Smyth (the daughter of John George Smyth) on 26 November 1868. This marriage also produced children, another son, George James, and another daughter Mary Eleanor.

Four of Thursby's brothers followed him into military service. James Legh Thursby fought with the 9th Regiment of Foot (Royal Norfolk Regiment) in the Crimea and went on achieve the rank of Major in the 22nd (Cheshire Regiment). Arthur Harvey Thursby was a Lieutenant in the Warwickshire Yeomanry. Piers Thursby was a Captain in the 9th Queen's Royal Lancers, while Richard Hasell Thursby achieved the rank of Lieutenant-Colonel in the Coldstream Guards.

== See also ==
- Thursby baronets

Honorary titles
Preceded by Sir Andrew Barclay Walker	High Sheriff of Lancashire; 1887	Succeeded by Oliver Heywood
Baronetage of the United Kingdom
New creation	Baronet (of Ormerod House and Holmhurst); 1887–1901	Succeeded by Sir John OS Thursby
