= Burnley Barracks =

Military installation in Burnley, Lancashire, England

- Burnley, Lancashire
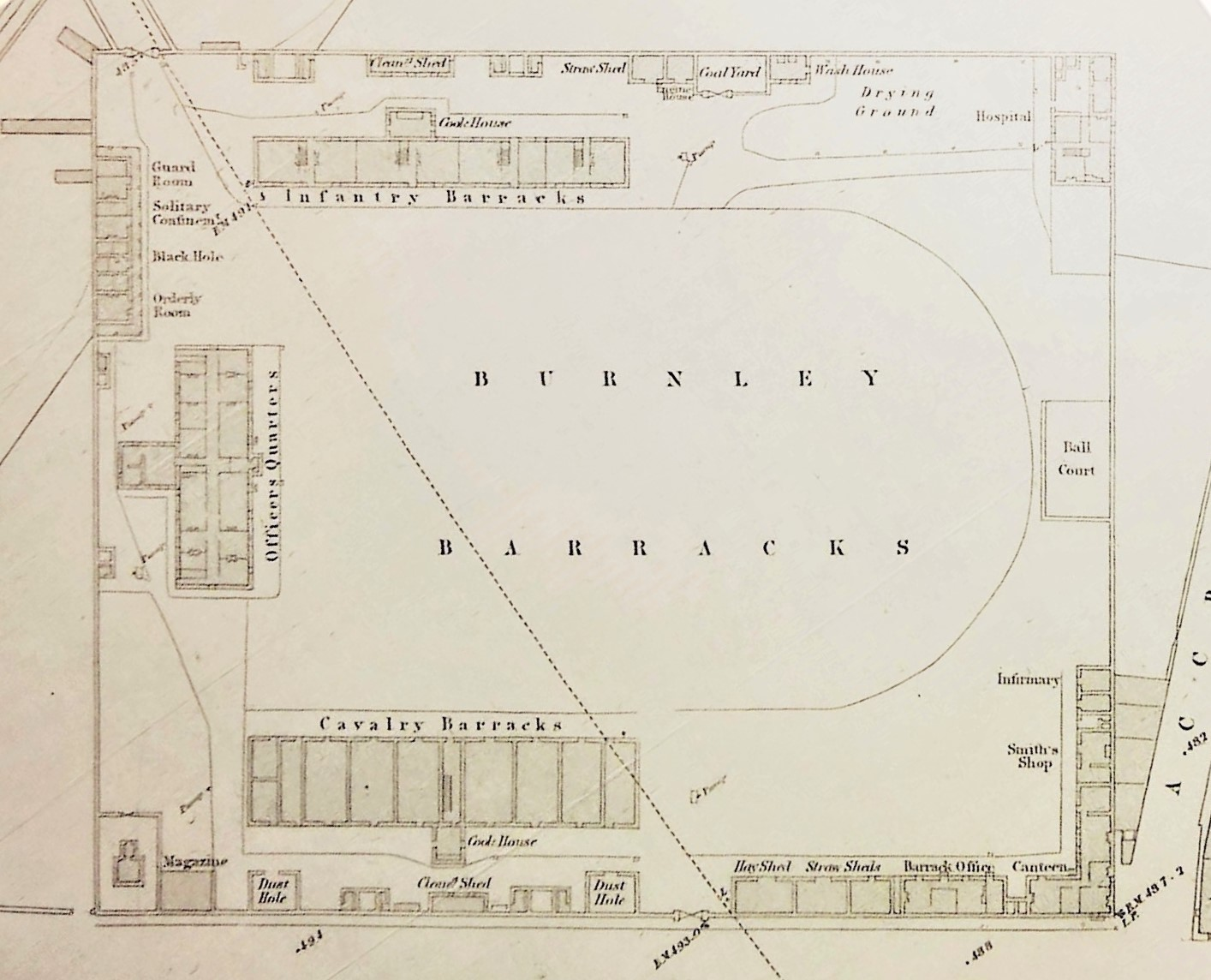
- A plan of the barracks in 1851

Site information
- Type: Barracks
- Owner: War Office
- Operator: British Army

Location
- Location within Burnley Location within Burnley Borough Location within Lancashire
- Coordinates: 53.7892°N 2.2610°W

Site history
- Built: 1820
- In use: 1820-1898

Burnley Barracks was a military installation at Burnley in Lancashire, England. Built for cavalry, but later used for infantry and storage, military activities at the barracks declined in the late 19th century.

== Background ==
The time of the French Revolutionary Wars (1793-1802) was comparatively prosperous for Lancashire workers as although technology had reduced the importance of some traditional jobs, overall there was plenty of work and wages were high. During the Napoleonic Wars (1803-1815) that closely followed, exports diminished but this did not cause great hardship locally. However the peace led to a period when prices remained high but wages continuously fell. Although Manchester and surrounding towns had been affected by the Luddite riots, it was not until 1818 that disturbances were recorded in Burnley. In September a Lancashire-wide strike of spinners and weavers saw large crowds on the streets and the magistrates called troops from Manchester to disperse them. A few days later a mob attacked the constable and "broke open" the prison to release those arrested. Alarmed by the situation, the local authorities in 1819 not only constructed a new prison, but took the decision to station troops in the town with temporary barracks established at Lane Bridge. (Note: Lane Bridge no longer appears on maps, but those from the 19th-century show it be the area to the south of the bridge on Parker Lane.) A protest meeting in early August subsequently saw the only speaker arrested, whereas a similar one that occurred two weeks later in Manchester is remembered as the Peterloo Massacre.

== History ==
They (the unemployed) must lie down and die for anything I know; for if they would beg, I know of none who would give anything; and if they would rob or plunder, they have the soldiers of Burnley ready to give them their last supper.

— The diary of William Varley, Higham weaver; 1826

In 1820 the government offered funds toward a permanent barracks in the Blackburn Hundred and Thomas Dunham Whitaker with his fellow magistrates eventually opted for land at Burnley offered by Robert Townley Parker. The site was located on a ridge close to the Gannow tunnel on the Leeds and Liverpool Canal and between the old and newer roads to Blackburn. (Note: What today is Barracks Road became known as Blackburn Old Road after Padiham Road was constructed by a turnpike trust (Blackburn, Addingham and Cocking End) in the 1750s.) Nearly half of the £5,500 cost of building the barracks was funded by local landowners and businessmen hoping it would prevent rioting.

Conditions across Lancashire had reached the lowest point by 1826, with the situation in Burnley so severe that The Times reported that people were digging-up the carcases of diseased animals for food. Although the power-loom riots that year affected the Accrington, Blackburn and Rossendale areas, there is nothing in the court records of the assizes or quarter sessions to suggest Burnley was caught-up in the trouble. However it was from these barracks that artillery was despatched to Old Clough Mill in Weir.

The rise of Chartism saw riots in Colne in April and August 1840, with a special constable killed by a mob armed with sharpened iron rails during the second. In both cases troops marched from Burnley and the violence ceased with their arrival. In November 1841, the barracks was the site of double-murder suicide. Private Robert Morris, a mess waiter and servant to Lt. O'Grady, had formed an intimacy with Isabella Hadden, the daughter of the mess-master. On a Sunday evening, Morris fatally stabbed Hadden and O'Grady in the officer's bedroom using a carving knife, before also killing himself. During the 1842 General Strike, in August, troops were called to disperse a mob attempting to stop work at a coal mine to the west of the town. The following day a group of 3,000 marched to Skipton and the military was again sent to intervene, with one soldier severely injured by the stone-throwing crowd.

The construction of the railway in the second half of the 1840s led to rapid development around the site and the local station, originally only a temporary terminus, was re-opened as Burnley Barracks railway station in 1851. Up to 1861, the Barracks had been used exclusively by the cavalry, usually two troops on six-month detachments. However it was then without a garrison for four years and afterwards it was only occupied for progressively shorter periods with infantry regiments sometimes based here. Among the various regiments of lancers and hussars stationed at the barracks are the Scots Greys, 5th Dragoon Guards and the 6th (Inniskilling) Dragoons, and infantry such as the 33rd Regiment of Foot, Connaught Rangers and Black Watch. For a time during the Crimean War, an Italian regiment from Piedmont was quartered here.

In 1873 a system of recruiting areas based on counties was instituted under the Cardwell Reforms and the barracks became the depot for the linked 30th (Cambridgeshire) Regiment of Foot and 59th (2nd Nottinghamshire) Regiment of Foot, and the Burnley-based 5th Royal Lancashire Militia. Rioting during the Burnley weavers strike in 1878 again saw troops deployed with 87 cavalry and 302 infantry supporting the police on the third day of trouble. Following the Childers Reforms, the 30th Regiment and the 59th Regiment amalgamated to form the East Lancashire Regiment with its depot at the barracks in 1881. With the barracks in a poor state of repair, the East Lancashire Regiment re-located to Fulwood Barracks in Preston in 1898. The site was sold soon afterwards, with the clearance of many buildings during the 1960s and 70s, and the construction of the M65 motorway in 1981, greatly changing the area.

== Layout ==
The first Ordnance Survey map of the area from 1848, shows the rectangular barracks located east of the town, with buildings around a central open space and entrances mid-way along the south-western boundary and at the northern corner. A survey in 1846-7 listed the stone-built barracks as containing: 36 sleeping rooms, (Note: As the survey only lists the facilities for enlisted men, only the servants' bedrooms are included in the officers quarters.) a wash-house, two cook-houses, a hospital for 16 patients and a reading room. Water was provided by three wells and 34,000 imperial gallons (154,567 L) rainwater collection system. In 1863 a tender was advertised for a two-year project requiring a range of building trades.

== Incidental ==
Sir James Yorke Scarlett who rose to prominence in the Crimean War, was a lieutenant colonel in the 5th Dragoon Guards in 1835 when he married Charlotte Hargreaves, a Burnley coal heiress, with the town becoming his adopted home.

== Media gallery ==
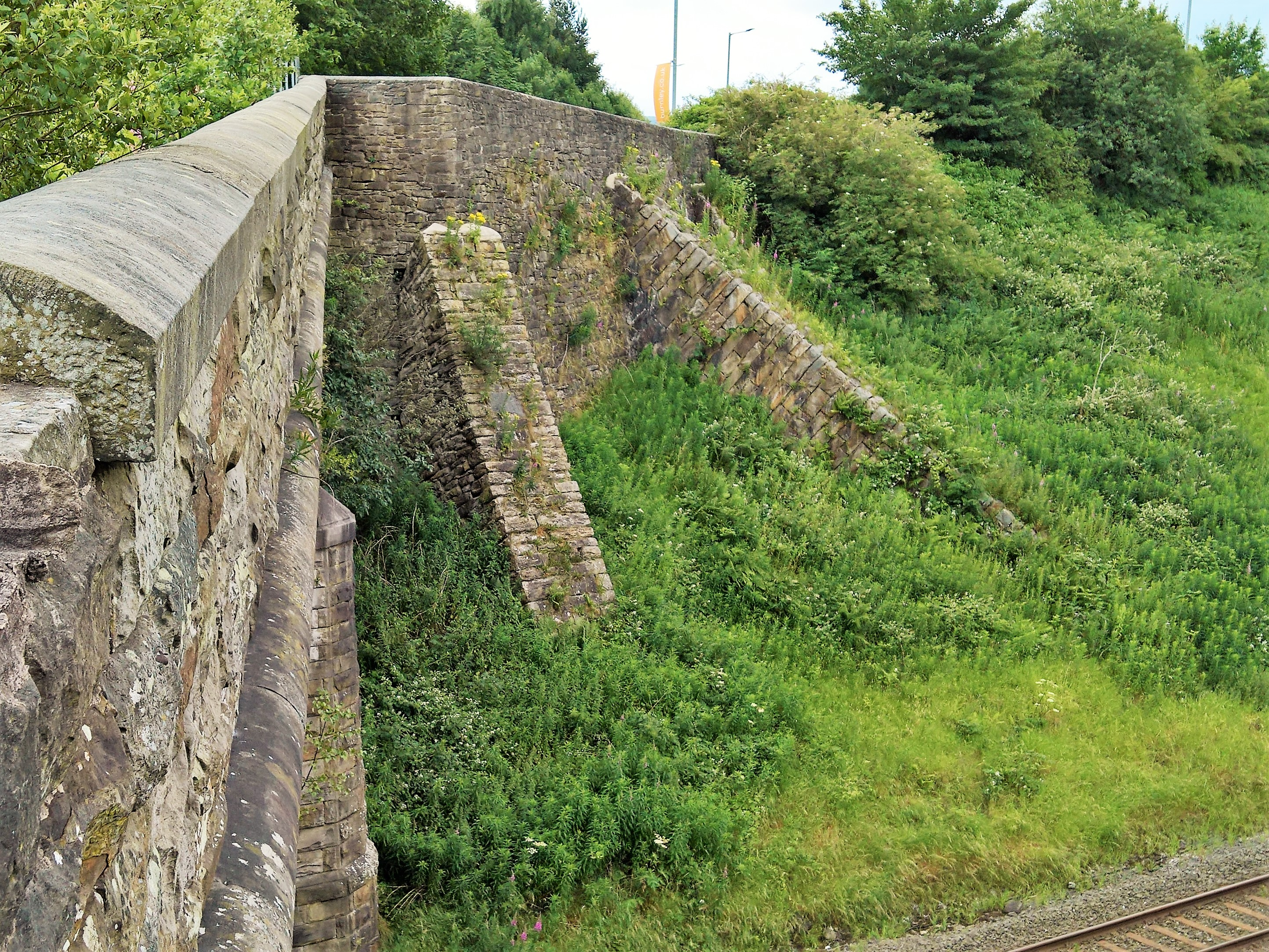
A surviving section of the walls at the northern corner of the barracks, as viewed from the Cavalry Street bridge.

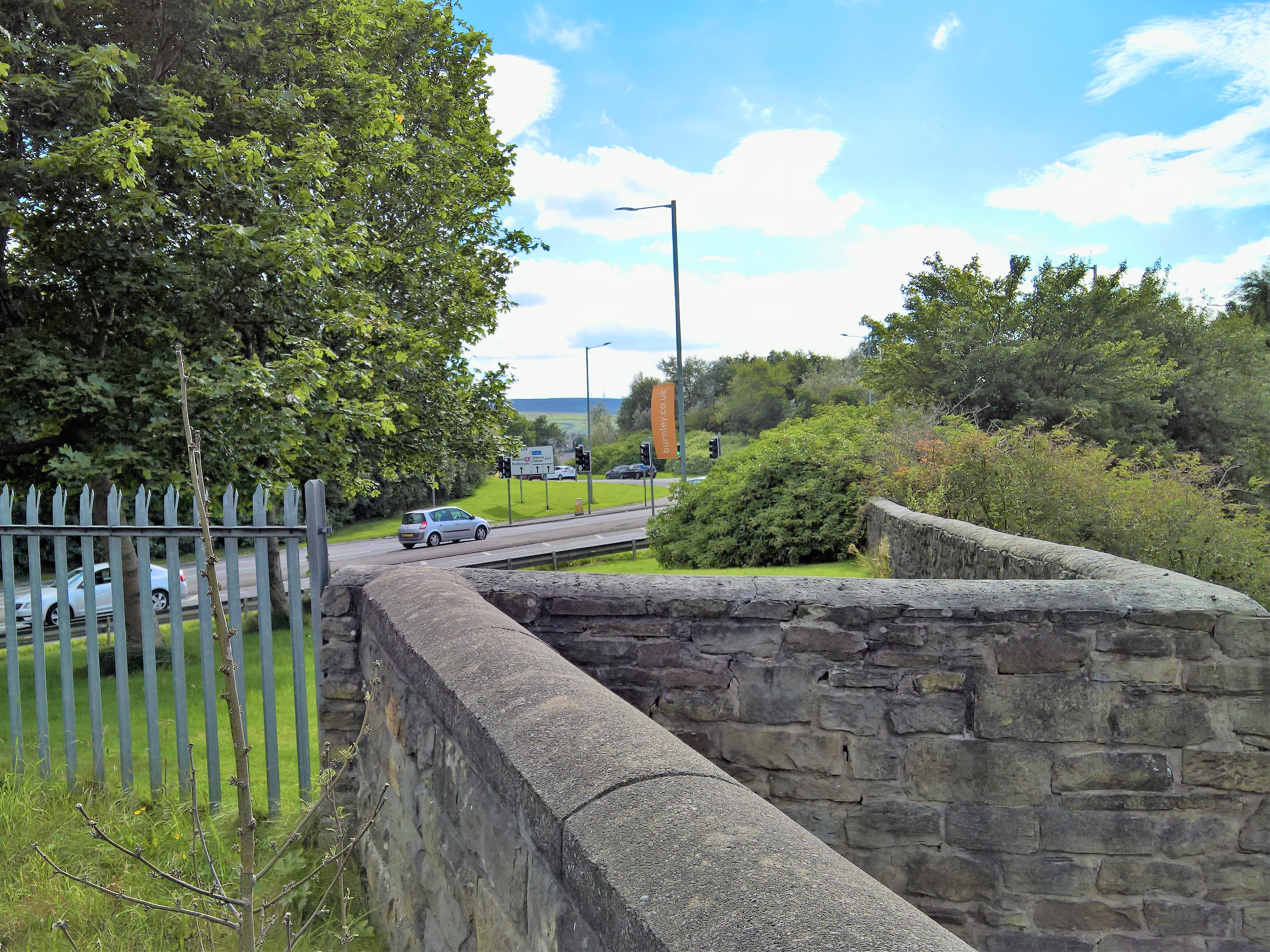
A view along the surviving section of north-west wall. Today part of the A671 and the roundabout on the southern side of the motorway junction run across the site.

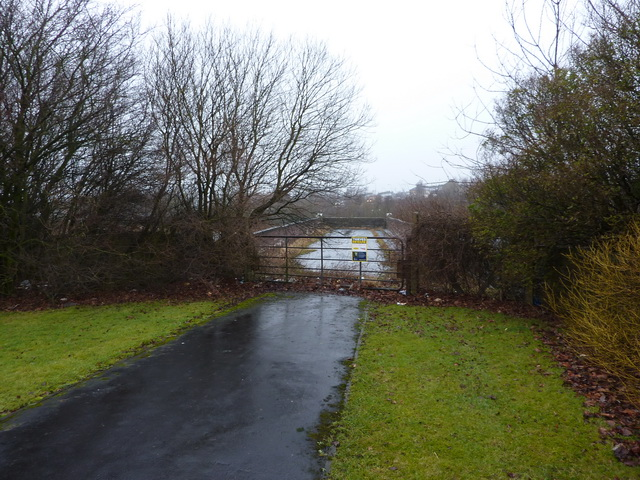
This section of Barracks Road (which spans the railway) is at what used to be the western corner of the barracks site.

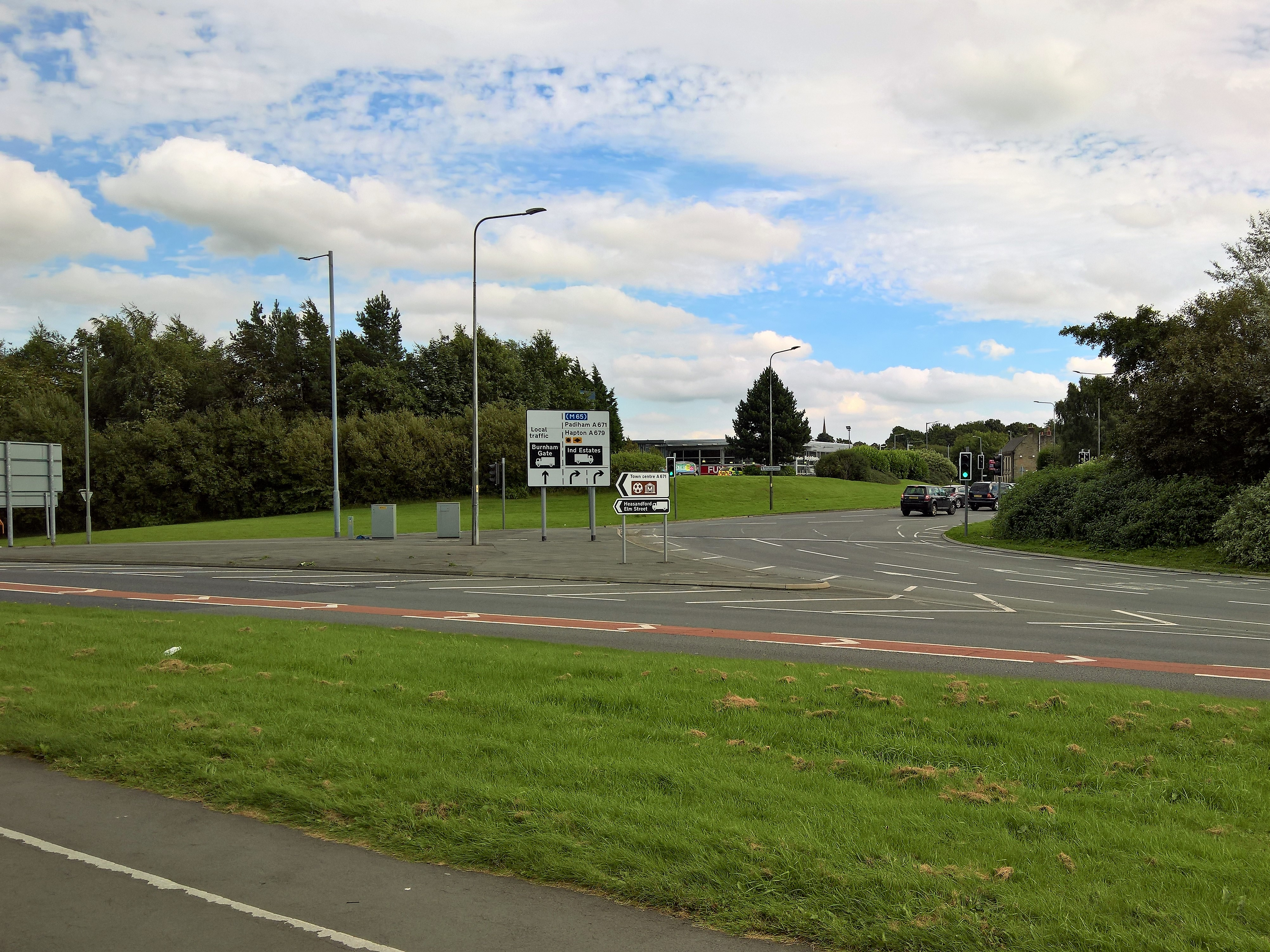
Looking south-east along the former route of Barracks Road show that nothing remains at this corner.
