= Philipps baronets of Picton (1887) =

The coat of arms of the Philipps baronets (Philipps quartering Fisher).

The Philipps Baronetcy, of Picton in the County of Pembroke, was created in the Baronetage of the United Kingdom on 23 July 1887 for Charles Edward Gregg Philipps, Lord-Lieutenant of Haverfordwest from 1876 to 1925. Born Charles Edward Gregg Fisher, he was the husband of Mary Philippa, daughter of James Henry Alexander Philipps (originally Gwyther), half-brother and heir of Sir Richard Philipps, 1st Baronet of the second creation.

The title became extinct on the death of the 4th Baronet in 1962, whose father, Capt. George William Fisher Foley-Philipps, added the name and arms of Foley by Royal Licence in 1922.

== Philipps, later Foley-Philipps baronets, of Picton (1887) ==
- Sir Charles Edward Gregg Philipps, 1st Baronet (1840–1928)
- Sir Henry Erasmus Edward Philipps, 2nd Baronet (1871–1938)
- Sir John Erasmus Gwynne Alexander Philipps, 3rd Baronet (1915–1948)
- Sir Richard Foley Foley-Philipps, 4th Baronet (1920–1962)

Coat of arms of Foley-Philipps of Picton
Notes Mantling:sable and argent Crest On a wreath of the colours, a lion rampant gorged and chained as in the arms (for PHILIPPS); dexter, in front of a bulrush erect a kingfisher proper, resting the dexter claw on a fleur-de-lys or (for FISHER); sinister, a lion sejant argent, charged on the shoulder with an anchor and (for distinction) a cross crosslet sable, and holding between the paws a naval crown or (for FOLEY). Escutcheon Quarterly, 1 and 4, grand quarters 1st and 4th, argent, a lion rampant sable, gorged with a ducal coronet, therefrom a chain reflexed over the back or (for PHILIPPS); 2nd and 3rd, argent, on a chevron gules, three trefoils slipped of the field, in chief as many fleurs-de-lys of the second (for FISHER); 2 and 3, grand quarters or, a fesse engrailed gules, between three cinquefoils sable, a bordure of the last, on a chief wavy azure, pendent from ribbons argent, fimbriated of the fourth, two gold medals, the one on the dexter representing that which was conferred on Sir Thomas Foley by command of his late Majesty King George III., in commemoration of his services in the Battle of the Nile, and the one on the sinister representing that which he received by H.M.'s command in testimony of his Royal approbation of his services in the Battle of St. Vincent, around the said medals respectively the words " Nile " and " St. Vincent," in letters of gold, in the chief point (for distinction) a cross crosslet also gold (for FOLEY) Motto "Ducit amor patriae."

== Notes ==
Baronetage of the United Kingdom
Preceded by Moon baronets	Philipps baronets of Picton; 23 July 1887	Succeeded by Lucas baronets
