= 30th (Cambridgeshire) Regiment of Foot =

Line infantry regiment of the English and British armies

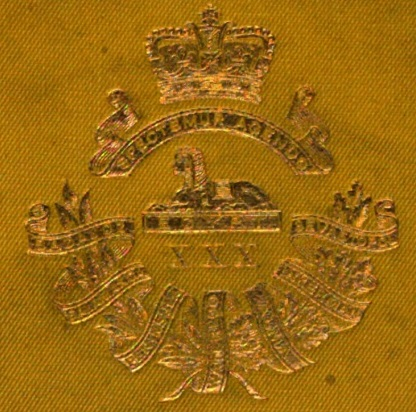
- The regimental cap badge
- Active: 1702–1881
- Allegiance: England (1702–1707); Great Britain (1707–1801); United Kingdom (1801–1881)
- Branch: English Army (1702–1707); British Army (1707–1881)
- Type: Regiment
- Role: Line infantry
- Garrison/HQ: Burnley Barracks, Burnley
- Nickname: The Triple X's
- Colors: Pale yellow facings
- Engagements: Capture of Gibraltar; French campaign in Egypt and Syria; Peninsular War; Napoleonic Wars; Crimean War

The 30th (Cambridgeshire) Regiment of Foot was a line infantry regiment of the English and British armies which was raised in 1702. Under the Childers Reforms, it was amalgamated with the 59th (2nd Nottinghamshire) Regiment of Foot to form the East Lancashire Regiment in 1881.

== History ==
=== Origins ===
The regiment was originally raised in Lincolnshire by Viscount Castleton as Lord Castleton's Regiment of Foot in 1689, during the Nine Years' War. In 1691 travelled to Flanders. In 1694 the colonelcy of the unit changed (Until 1751 the regiment's name changed according to the name of the colonel commanding) and it became Colonel Thomas Sanderson's Regiment of Foot. With the signing of the Treaty of Ryswick in 1697 the war came to an end. Sanderson's Regiment returned to England, where it was disbanded on 4 March 1698.

By 1702 England was involved in the War of the Spanish Succession. Sanderson was commissioned to reform his regiment as marines. In February 1702 Thomas Sanderson's Regiment of Marines (or the 1st Regiment of Marines) was reraised in Lincolnshire. The unit took part in the capture and defence of Gibraltar in July 1704. It subsequently took part in the campaign led by the Earl of Peterborough and was involved in the capture of Barcelona in September 1705. The regiment's title changed with the name of its colonel: Thomas Pownall (1704–1705) and Charles Wills (from 1705).

=== War of the Austrian Succession ===
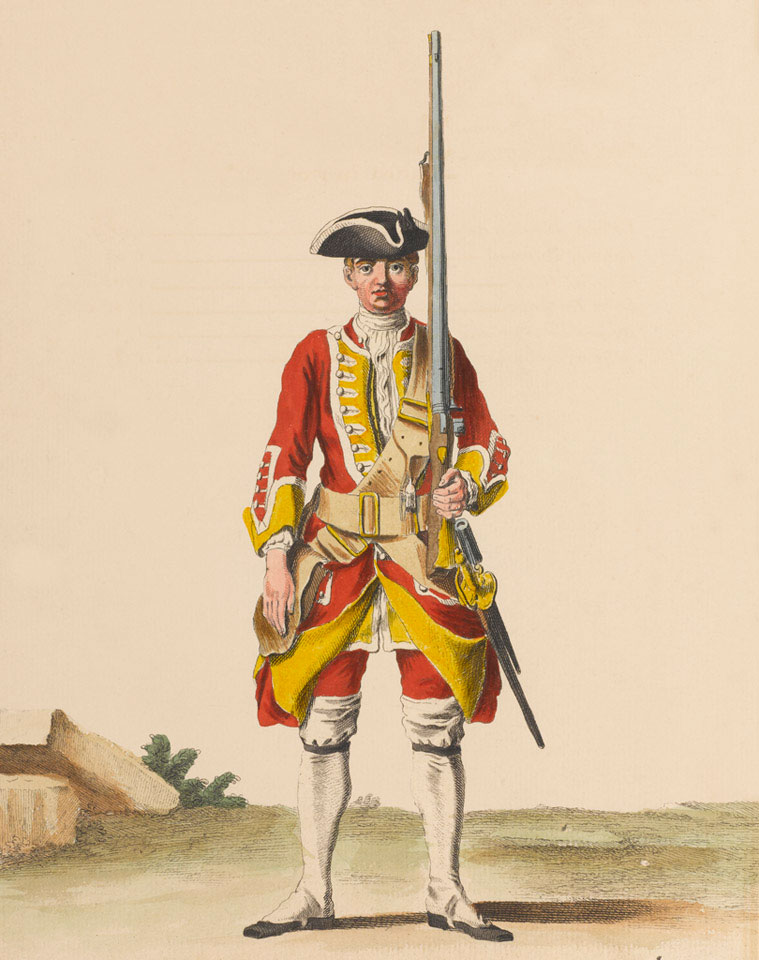
c. 1742 illustration of a regimental private

In 1714 the regiment was converted to conventional infantry as Charles Willis's Regiment of Foot and deployed to Ireland later that year. In 1724, as Bisset's Regiment of Foot, they were sent to Menorca on garrison duty and were again in Gibraltar during the siege of 1727. The regiment served in Ireland again from 1732 to 1743 and then in September 1746, as Frampton's Regiment of Foot, sailed with the expedition under General James St Clair to capture the Breton port of Lorient during the War of the Austrian Succession: They also destroyed the French fortifications near Quiberon and returned to England. Troops from the regiment served as marines again on board Lord Anson's fleet at the First Battle of Cape Finisterre in May 1747. The regiment was sent to Ireland again in 1749.

=== Seven Years' War ===
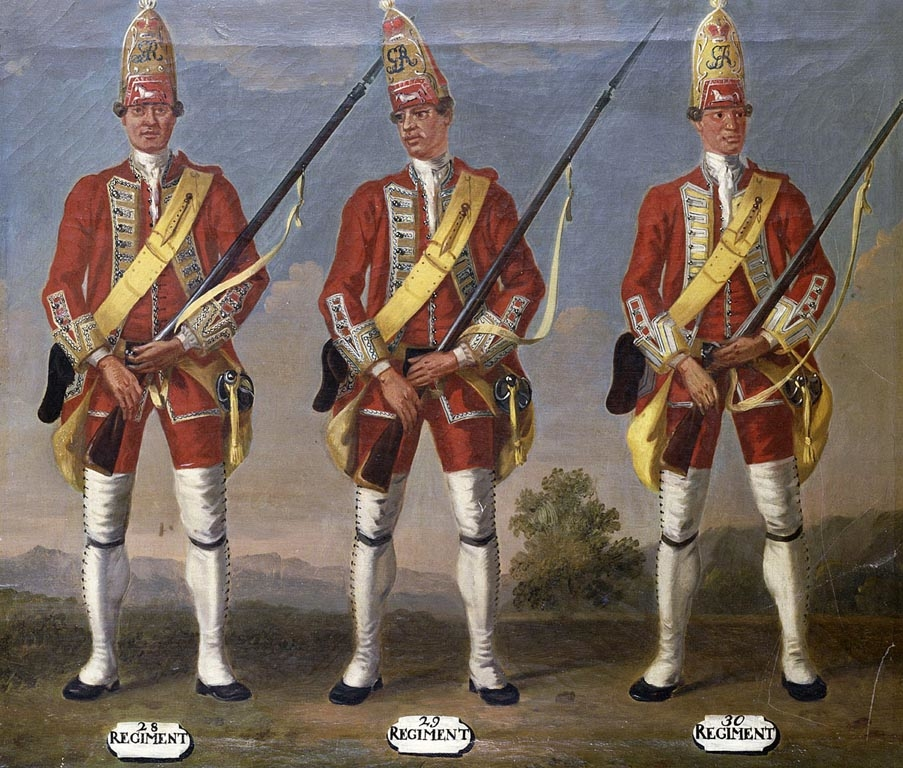
c. 1751 portrait of a regimental grenadier (right)

On 1 July 1751 a royal warrant was issued declaring that in future regiments were no longer to be known by their colonel's name, but by the "Number or Rank of the Regiment". Accordingly, Colonel the Earl of Loudoun's Regiment was renamed as the 30th Regiment of Foot. The warrant also for the first time regulated the uniform clothing of the army, and provided that the 30th should wear pale yellow facings on their red uniform coats. The regiment returned to England in 1755 and took part in the Raid on Rochefort in September 1757, the Raid on St Malo in June 1758 and the Raid on Cherbourg in August 1758 as well as the Battle of Saint Cast in September 1758 during the Seven Years' War. Their most notable action during the war was the capture of Belle Île in June 1761. The regiment served in Gibraltar again from 1763 to 1771 and in Ireland again from 1775 to 1781.

=== American War of Independence ===
In 1781 the regiment embarked for North America where they arrived in Charleston to take part in the southern campaign of the American War of Independence. The regiment then spent nine years on Antigua, Saint Lucia and Dominica. In 1782 all regiments of the line without a royal title were given a county designation and the regiment became the 30th (Cambridgeshire) Regiment of Foot. In 1791 the regiment was called to put down a rebellion by the Maroons.

=== French Revolutionary and Napoleonic Wars ===
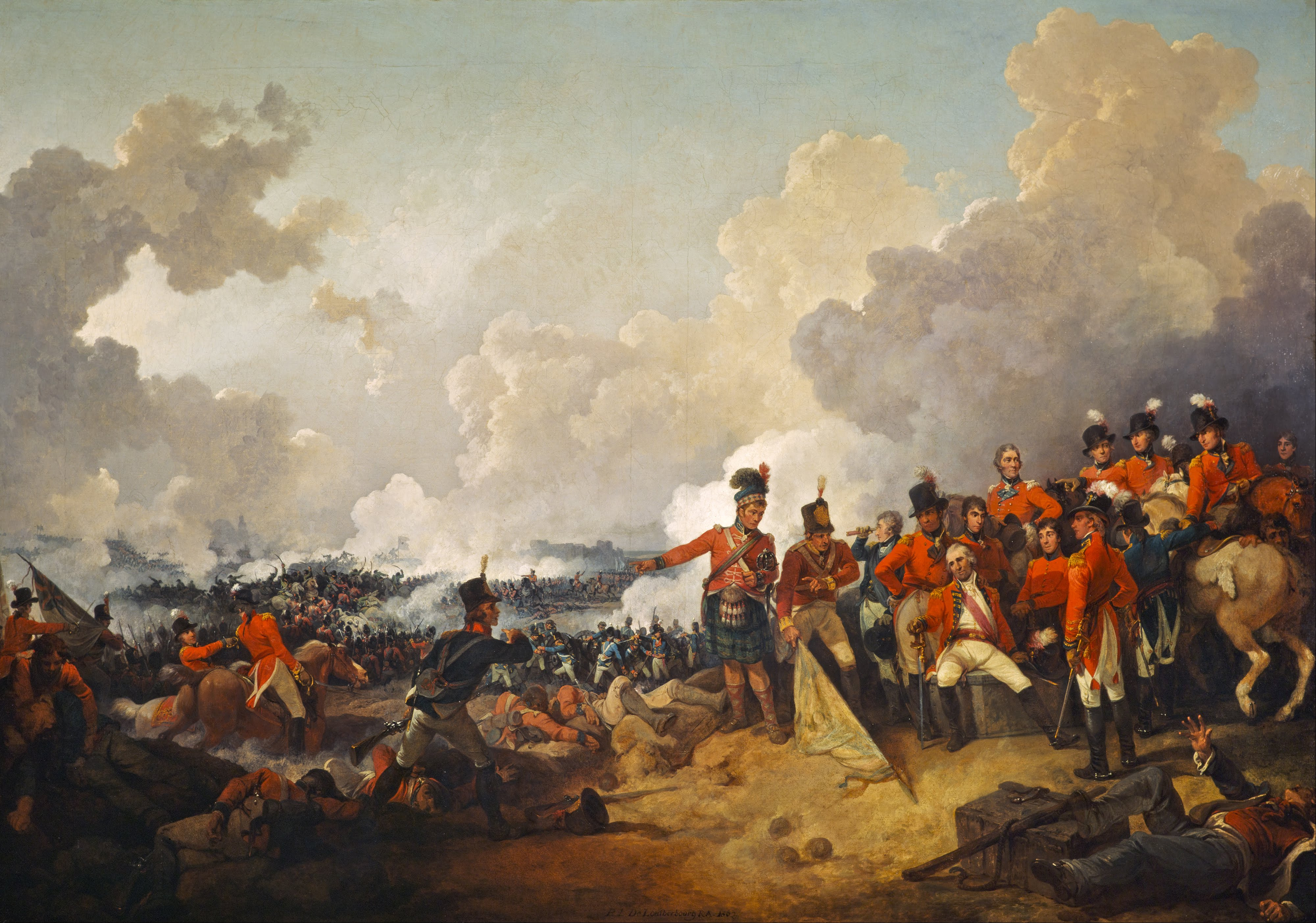
The Battle of Alexandria, which the regiment fought in

The regiment arrived back in England in 1791 and provided support to the French Royalists at the Siege of Toulon in autumn 1793 during the French Revolutionary Wars. In March 1801 the regiment formed part of the British expedition to liberate French-occupied Egypt and took part in the Battle of Mandora and then the Battle of Alexandria later that month. The regiment returned to England in 1802 and formed a second battalion in the following year. In January 1807 the 1st Battalion sailed for India where it remained throughout the war.

The 2nd Battalion embarked for Portugal in March 1809 for service in the Peninsular War. It fought at the Siege of Badajoz in March 1812: the battalion's losses were 6 officers including the commanding officer, Lieutenant Colonel George Grey, and 132 other ranks. It also saw action at the Battle of Salamanca in July 1812. It went on to fight at the Siege of Burgos in September 1812 before returning home in December 1812. The battalion subsequently landed in Holland and fought at the Battle of Quatre Bras and the Battle of Waterloo in June 1815. At Waterloo the 2nd Battalion, 73rd (Perthshire) Regiment of Foot and the 2nd Battalion, 30th Regiment of Foot formed a defensive square to defend their ground against successive French attacks.

By the beginning of 1816 the 2nd Battalion were once more in Ireland. In April 1817 the order came for disbandment of the 2nd Battalion. Lieutenant Edward Macready wrote in his journal:

"This brave corps ... will be remembered as long as the names of Fuentes de Onoro, Badajoz, Salamanca, Muriel, Quatre Bras and Waterloo are emblazoned in the highest pages of British achievement."

The same year, the 1st Battalion, already in India, was involved in the Third Anglo-Maratha War before returning to England in 1829. The regiment then served in Ireland from 1831 to 1834, in Bermuda from 1834 to 1841 and Nova Scotia from 1841 to 1843. It was back in Ireland again from 1844 to 1846.

=== The Victorian era ===
The regiment landed at Scutari in May 1854 and was present at the Battle of Alma in September 1854, the Battle of Inkerman in November 1854 and the Siege of Sevastopol in winter 1854 during the Crimean War. In June 1861 the regiment moved to Canada as Britain increased their military presence following the Trent Affair. The regiment remained there until 1869, and was involved in repelling the Fenian raids.

=== Amalgamation ===
The regiment was posted to Ireland in 1869, moving to Jersey in 1871. As part of the Cardwell Reforms of the 1870s, where single-battalion regiments were linked together to share a single depot and recruiting district in the United Kingdom, the 30th was linked with the 59th (2nd Nottinghamshire) Regiment of Foot, and assigned to district no. 15 at Burnley Barracks in Lancashire. It sailed for India in January 1880. On 1 July 1881 the Childers Reforms came into effect and the regiment amalgamated with the 59th (2nd Nottinghamshire) Regiment of Foot to form the East Lancashire Regiment.

== Battle honours ==
The 30th Foot was granted the following battle honours and honorary distinctions to be borne on their colours. The year shown is the year of the award, not the action.

- Napoleonic wars: Badajoz (1825), Salamanca (1830), Peninsular (1815 to 2nd Battalion: to whole regiment in 1827), Waterloo (1815 to 2nd Battalion: to whole regiment in 1827), The sphinx superscribed "EGYPT"(1802)
- Crimean War:Alma (1855), Inkerman (1855), Sevastopol (1855)

== Victoria Cross ==
- Lieutenant Mark Walker, Crimean War (5 November 1854)

== Regimental Colonels ==
Colonels of the Regiment were:

- 1689–1694: James Saunderson, Earl of Castleton
- 1694–1699: Col. Thomas Saunderson
- Regiment disbanded, 1799
- Regiment reformed, 1802

Thomas Saunderson's Regiment of Marines

- 1702–1704: Col. Thomas Saunderson
- 1704–1705: Col. Thomas Pownall
- 1705–1716: Gen. Sir Charles Wills, KB
- Converted to foot regiment, 1714
- 1716–1717: Col. George Forrester Baillie, 5th Lord Forrester
- 1717: Brig-Gen. Thomas Stanwix
- 1717–1742: Lt-Gen. Andrew Bissett
- 1742–1743: Maj-Gen. Henry de Grangues
- 1743–1749: Lt-Gen. Charles Frampton
- 1749–1770: Gen. John Campbell, 4th Earl of Loudoun

30th Regiment of Foot - (1751)

- 1770–1786: Gen. John Parslow

30th (Cambridgeshire) Regiment of Foot

- 1786–1790: Maj-Gen. William Roy
- 1790–1792: Maj-Gen. Sir Henry Calder, Bt
- 1792–1799: Gen. Thomas Clarke
- 1799–1823: Gen. Robert Manners
- 1823–1829: Lt-Gen. James Montgomerie
- 1829–1846: Gen. Sir Thomas Bradford, GCB, GCH
- 1846–1862: F.M. George Hay, 8th Marquess of Tweeddale, KT, GCB
- 1862–1867: Lt-Gen. Thomas Wright
- 1867–1881: Gen. Charles Ashmore
- 1881: Gen. Sir George Vaughan Maxwell, KCB

== Sources ==
- Historical records of the XXX Regiment. London: William Clowes and Sons. 1887.
- Edwards, T J (1953). Standards, Guidons and Colours of the Commonwealth Forces. Aldershot: Gale & Polden.
- Rudolf, R de M (1905). Short History of the Territorial Regiments of the British Army. London: Her Majesty's Stationery Office.
- Sumner, Ian (2001). British Colours & Standards 1747–1881 (2): Infantry. Oxford: Osprey. ISBN 1-84176-201-6.
- Swinson, Arthur (1972). A Register of the Regiments and Corps of the British Army. London: The Archive Press. ISBN 0-85591-000-3.
