= 59th (2nd Nottinghamshire) Regiment of Foot =

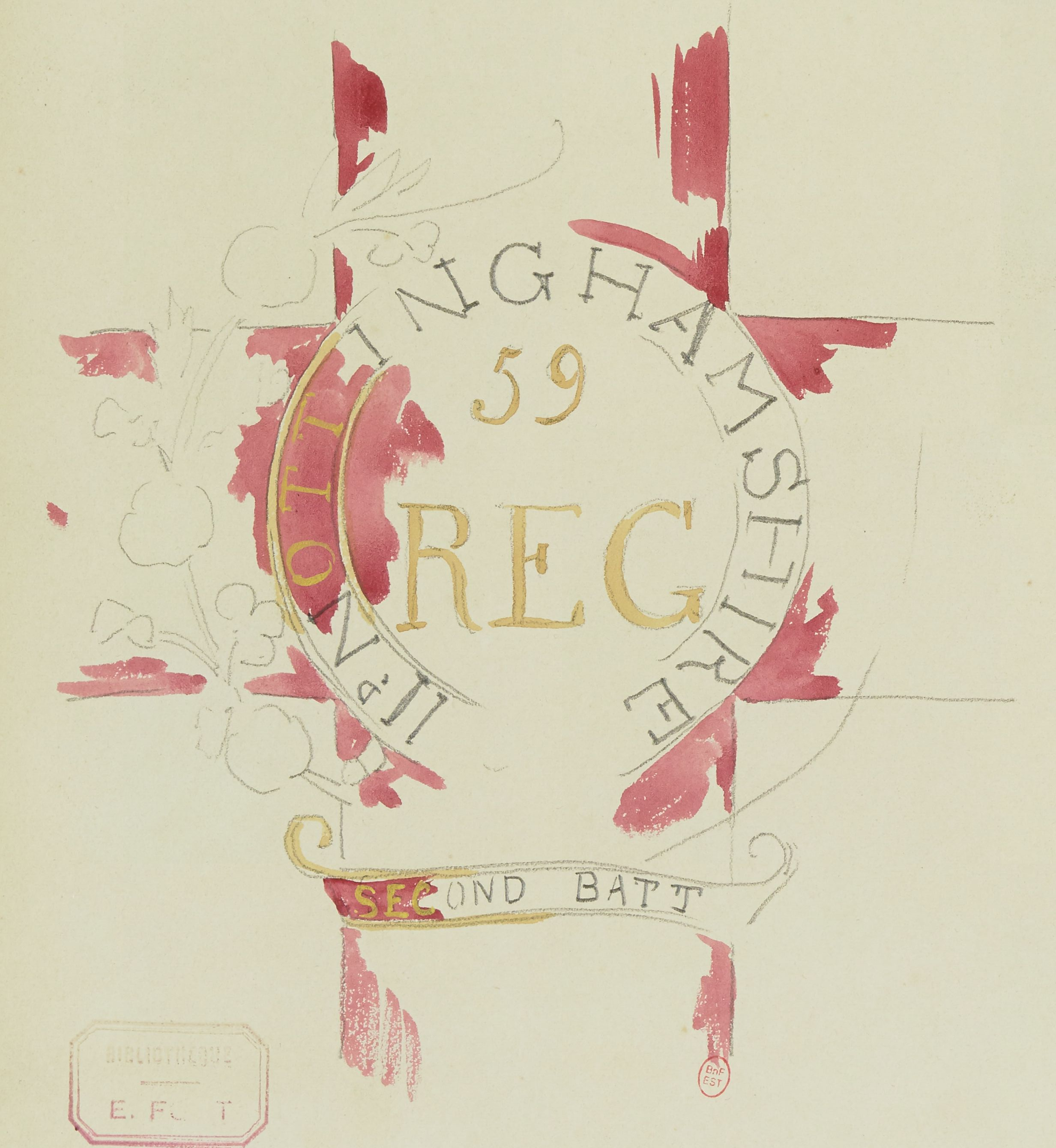
- Sketch of the 2nd Battalion's Colours in 1814.
- Active: 1755–1881
- Country: Kingdom of Great Britain (1755–1800); United Kingdom (1801–1881)
- Branch: British Army
- Size: One battalion (two battalions 1804–1816)
- Garrison/HQ: Burnley Barracks, Lancashire
- Nickname: The Lily Whites
- Colors: White facings
- Engagements: American Revolutionary War; Napoleonic Wars; Second Opium War; Second Anglo-Afghan War

The 59th (2nd Nottinghamshire) Regiment of Foot was an infantry regiment of the British Army, formed in 1755 in response to the threat of renewed war with France. Under the Childers Reforms it amalgamated with the 30th (Cambridgeshire) Regiment of Foot to form the East Lancashire Regiment in 1881.

== History ==
=== Early history ===
The regiment was raised in the counties of Leicestershire and Northamptonshire by Sir Charles Montagu as the 61st Regiment of Foot in 1755 for service in the Seven Years' War. It was re-ranked as the 59th Regiment of Foot, following the disbandment of the existing 50th and 51st regiments, in 1756.

Shortly after its formation, the regiment moved from England to Ireland, where it performed garrison duty until 1763. In that year the 59th Foot sailed to Nova Scotia where they remained until 1772 when they stationed in Boston, Massachusetts. The 59th were in Boston when the American War of Independence broke out, and fought in the Battle of Bunker Hill. However, by 1776, the 59th had lost so much men that its remnants were dispersed among other regiments, while its officers returned to Britain to re-recruit.

In 1782, the closing stages of the Anglo Spanish War, the 59th were assigned to the Gibraltar garrison, remaining there for ten years. From 1792–1794 the regiment was based in England and the Channel Islands. In 1782 all regiments of the line without a royal title were given a county designation and the regiment became the 59th (2nd Nottinghamshire) Regiment of Foot (the 45th Foot being designated the 1st Nottinghamshire).

=== French Revolutionary Wars ===
With the outbreak of war with revolutionary France, the 59th formed part of the British force dispatched to Flanders, arriving in 1794. The campaign was a major reverse for the British and their allies, and the regiment was evacuated back to England in 1795.

Later in 1795 the 59th Foot sailed to the West Indies, where they were to remain for seven years. They were stationed in Saint Vincent, where they suppressed uprisings by the Maroons. They returned to England in 1802.

=== Napoleonic Wars ===
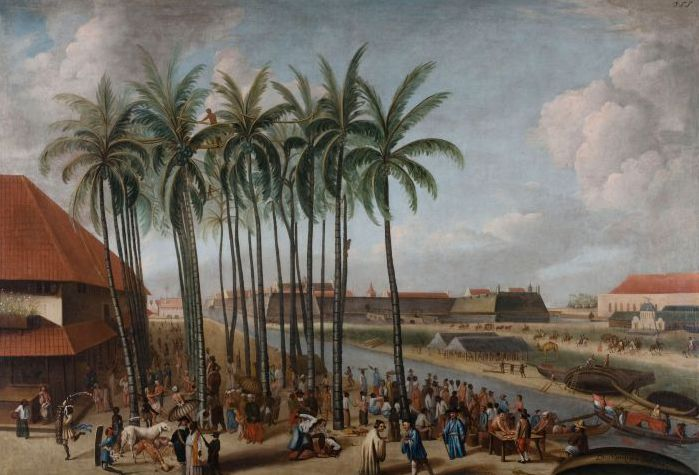
Batavia, capital of the Dutch East Indies, with citadel in the background.

In August 1804, while stationed in England, a second battalion of the 59th Foot was raised. The 1st Battalion sailed in the following year for the Cape of Good Hope, while the 2nd Battalion was to remain on garrison duty in England, Ireland and the Channel Islands until 1808.

The Cape of Good Hope, which had been captured by the British in 1795, had been returned to the Dutch under the Treaty of Amiens. On 7 January 1806 the 1st Battalion of the 59th was part of a brigade that landed at the Cape, and within two days the Dutch forces had surrendered. Although the regiment suffered only light casualties (two dead and six wounded) this was to be the 59th's first battle honour.

The 2nd Battalion, meanwhile, sailed for Spain in 1808. On 16 January 1809 it took part in the Battle of Corunna, a British tactical victory which allowed for the evacuation of their forces from the Iberian peninsula. From England, the battalion was dispatched to the Netherlands in July 1809, taking part in the fruitless Walcheren Campaign. The unit was to remain in England and Ireland until 1812.

From the Cape, the 1st Battalion sailed to India. In November 1810 the battalion took part in the invasion of Mauritius. In the following year they invaded Java in the Dutch East Indies. They remained in Java until 1815, when they returned to India.

In 1812 the 2nd Battalion returned to Spain. They took part in the Battle of Vittoria (June 1813), the Siege of San Sebastián (July – August 1813), the Battle of the Bidassoa (October 1813), the Battle of Nivelle (November 1813) and the Battle of the Nive (December 1813).

From France the 2/59th had sailed to Ireland. When Napoleon returned to France, triggering the "Hundred Days", the battalion was part of the British force dispatched to Belgium. While they were present in the Waterloo area, they did not take part in the hostilities. Having formed part of the army of occupation in France, the 2nd Battalion returned to England in 1816, where they were disbanded.

=== The Victorian era ===
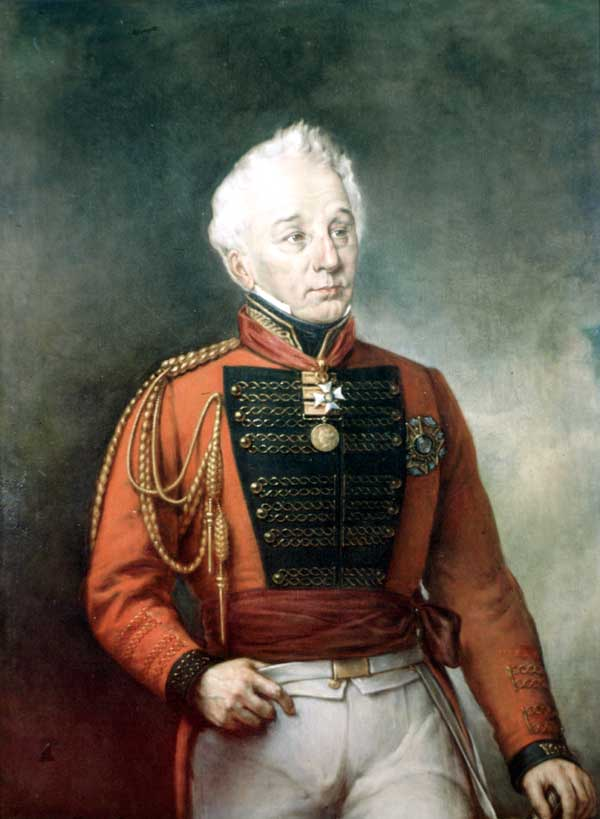
General Sir Frederick Philipse Robinson, colonel of the regiment in the 1830s

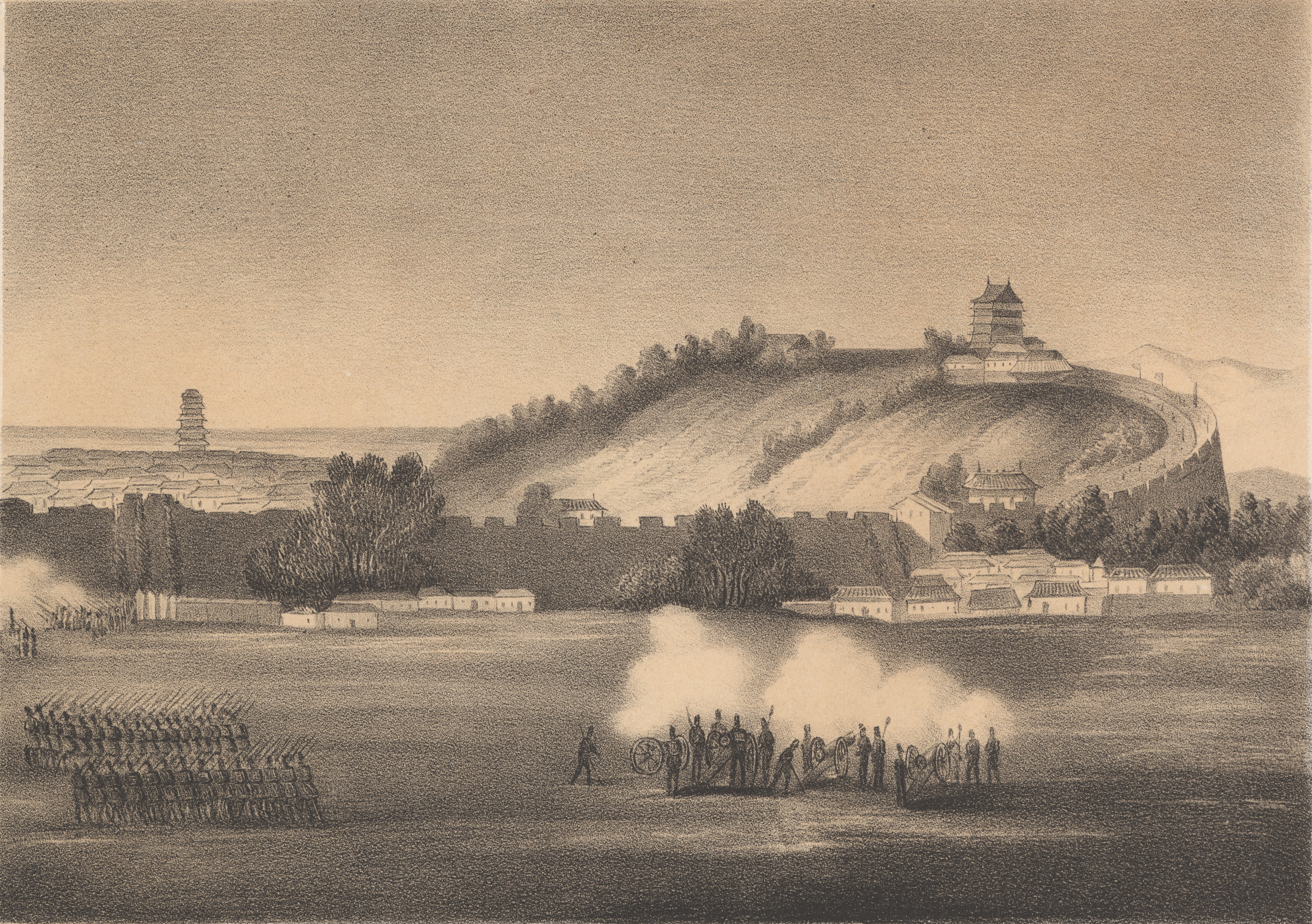
Bombardment of Canton December 1857

On the disbandment of the 2nd Battalion, the 1st was redesignated simply as the 59th (2nd Nottinghamshire) Regiment of Foot. The unit moved from India to Ceylon in 1817, returning to India in the following year, where it fought in the Third Anglo-Maratha War. In 1825–1826 they took part in the siege and capture of the Jat fortress of Bharatpur (awarded as the honour "Bhurtpore"). The regiment returned to England in 1829.

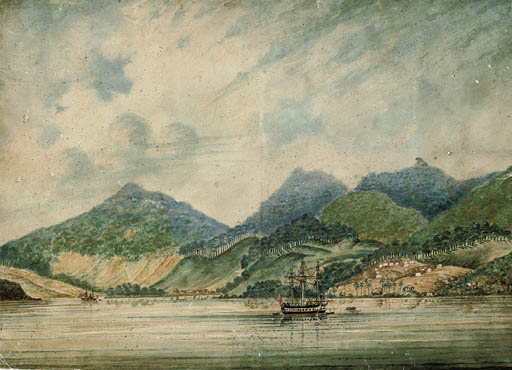
HM Troopship Apollo refitting a quarantine encampment of the 59th Regiment at Baia de Ilha Grande, Brazil, in 1849

For the next twenty years the 59th was engaged in garrison duties in England, Ireland, Malta and the West Indies. In 1849 they sailed to China to become part of a small force enforcing the terms imposed on China following the First Opium War. In 1856 Britain deemed the terms of the treaty to have been broken, and the Second Opium War commenced. In January 1858 the 59th Foot, along with members of the Royal Marine Light Infantry and the Royal Navy occupied the city of Canton.

In 1858 the 59th Foot moved to South Africa, subsequently returning to the United Kingdom in 1861. From 1867 – 1878 the regiment again served in India and Ceylon. From India the 59th crossed into Afghanistan in November 1878 as part of an invasion force, seeking to stem Russian influence in the region. In April 1880 they fought in the Battle of Ahmed Khel. Later in 1880 the 59th Foot returned to England.

=== Amalgamation ===
As part of the Cardwell Reforms of the 1870s, where single-battalion regiments were linked together to share a single depot and recruiting district in the United Kingdom, the 59th was linked with the 30th (Cambridgeshire) Regiment of Foot, and assigned to district no. 51 at Burnley Barracks in Lancashire. On 1 July 1881 the Childers Reforms came into effect and the regiment amalgamated with the 30th (Cambridgeshire) Regiment of Foot to form the East Lancashire Regiment with the 59th Foot becoming the 2nd Battalion of the East Lancashire Regiment. Following a series of amalgamations, the lineage of the 59th is now continued by the Duke of Lancaster's Regiment.

== Battle honours ==
The 59th Foot was awarded the following battle honours to be borne on the regimental colours. The year in brackets is the year of the award of the honour, not of the action it commemorates.

- Cape of Good Hope 1806 (1836)
- Corunna (1812)
- Java (1820)
- Vittoria (1818)
- San Sebastian (1818)
- Nive (1818)
- Peninsula (1815 to 2nd battalion; to whole regiment 1816)
- Bhurtpore (1826)
- Canton (1861)
- Ahmed Khel (1861)
- Afghanistan 1878–80 (1881)

== Victoria Cross ==
A Victoria Cross was awarded on 24 October 1879 to Captain Euston Henry Sartorius during the Second Anglo-Afghan War.

== Colonels of the Regiment ==
Colonels of the Regiment were:

=== 61st Regiment of Foot ===
- 1755–1760: Lt-Gen. Sir Charles Montagu, KB

=== 59th Regiment of Foot (1756) ===
- 1760–1776: Lt-Gen. John Owen
- 1776–1797: Gen. Sir David Lindsay, 4th Baronet

=== 59th (2nd Nottinghamshire) Regiment of Foot (1782) ===
- 1797-1801: Lt-Gen. Andrew Gordon
- 1801–1827: Gen. Alexander Ross
- 1827–1840: Gen. Sir Frederick Philipse Robinson, GCB
- 1840–1844: Lt-Gen. Sir Robert Lawrence Dundas, KCB
- 1844–1852: Lt-Gen. Sir John Harvey, KCB, KCH
- 1852–1857: Lt-Gen. George Augustus Henderson, KH, KC
- 1857–1862: Lt-Gen. Jeremiah Taylor
- 1862–1863: Maj-Gen. Plomer Young
- 1863–1865: Maj-Gen. John Clarke, KH
- 1865–1881: Gen. Henry Eyre (died 1889)

== Sources ==
- Sumner, Ian (2001). British Colours & Standards 1747 – 1881 (2): Infantry. Oxford: Osprey. ISBN 1-84176-201-6.
- Swinson, Arthur (1972). A Register of the Regiments and Corps of the British Army. London: The Archive Press. ISBN 0-85591-000-3.
